= Battle of Hiraan =

Historic (1903) battle site in Somalia

- Part of Dervish War and the Italian Somali Wars
Date	3 March 1913
Location	Beledweyne, Hiran, Somalia
Result	Dervish victory

Belligerents
Dervish State	Kingdom of Italy: Sultanate of Hobyo

Commanders and leaders
Mohamed Hassan; Isman Boos; Ismail Mire	(Kingdom of Italy) Col. Bessone; Ali Kenadid

Strength
900	1,000–1,300

Casualties and losses
Heavy	Unknown

The Battle of Hiraan was fought on March 3, 1913 in Beledweyne between the Italian Somaliland and the Dervish movement. The Italians never attacked again leaving the Dervish to rule over the south freely.

== Battle ==
In 1912 the Dervishes received intelligence that the Italians were gradually expanding in South Somalia and were closing in on Hiraan, an area free of colonial presence. The Italians most forward positions were in Mahaday (just above Jowhar), Alongside the Italians, Ali Yusuf Kenadiid who also suffered Dervish raids sent an army to aid the Italians.

On March 3, 1915, the armies marched from their positions into Beledweyne. The Italians marched from:

- Buuloburde
- Buqcaqable
- Tiyeeglow

The Hobyo sultanate army marched from:

- Mudug
- Ceelbur

The Dervish were facing a siege from all directions that lasted 3.5 days. Under heavy artillery bombardments and fierce gun fights the Beledweyne forts did not suffer any major destruction due to Cali Jalax's great engineering skills.

The Italians launched a three and a‑half day siege, deploying artillery and infantry attacks against sturdily built forts around Beledweyne. Despite the sustained bombardment, the Dervish defenders assisted by strong engineering under Cali Jalax prevented major damage to their fortifications.

The Italians ultimately abandoned their advance, retreating from the area. This retreat effectively ceded control of Hiraan to the Dervish movement, which later fortified its position by building new forts in the region. Italian forces never launched another southern offensive, enabling the Dervishes to maintain authority over much of southern Somalia during the First World War.

Isma'il Mire took part in the defence of the forts and recorded the Battle of Geeraar in a poem. The Hormadiid polity near Beledweyne was allied with the Italians, whilst the Webi polity near Shilaabo aided the Dervish State.
