= Sayyid Muhammad =

Sayyid Muhammad may refer to:

- Mohammed Abdullah Hassan, Somalian leader of the Dervish movement
- Sayyid Muhammad Khan, Khan of Khanate of Khiva
