= Abdullah Tahir =

Ethiopian politician

Governor of Jigjiga
- Reign: 1896–1913
- Religion: Sunni Islam
- Occupation: Trader, diplomat

Abdullah Tahir was a Yemeni-Ethiopian governor of Jigjiga in Ethiopia at the end of the nineteenth century.

== Early life ==
Abdullah was of Yemeni descent and spent his early years in the city of Harar as an affluent merchant.

== Political career ==
In 1896, he became the earliest appointed administrator of Jigjiga following the Abyssinian invasion by Ras Makonnen, it would lead to the emergence of Jigjiga's urban development. Governor Tahir created a security force to protect the town which consisted mainly of Somalis and Harari people as the Dervish militia had begun its activities in the region. Under his leadership the grand mosque of Jigjiga was built, this was in contrast to other parts of Abyssinian occupied Hararghe in which churches were erected to indicate Amhara supremacy over the traditionally Muslim region. According to British diplomat Christopher Addison, Abdullah was a collaborator with the UK.

In 1912, the appointment of Abdullahi Sadiq as governor of Ogaden by Lij Iyasu was opposed by both Abdullah Tahir and Haile Selassie.
