= Abdullahi Sadiq =

Ethiopian Prince of Overseers (died 1920)

Abdullahi Ali Sadiq
- Prince of Overseers
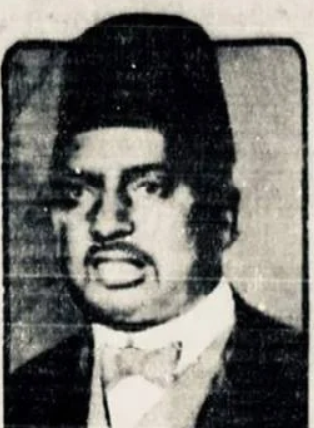

Governor of Ogaden
- Reign: 1890-1920
- Born: Ge, Harar Emirate
- Died: 1920; Addis Ababa, Abyssinia
- Burial: Addis Ababa, Ethiopian Empire
- Spouse: Fatuma Semod; Zeynaba Mohammed Ali Abdushakur; Sadia Mensur; Fatuma Aboker; Inay Tersuma Asebota
- Religion: Islam
- Occupation: trader, diplomat, counselor.

Abdullahi Ali Sadiq also known as Abdullahi Sadiq al-Harari was an influential Harari-Ethiopian businessman and governor for Ogaden whose peaceful jurisdiction spread beyond today's Ethiopia.

== Early days ==
Abdullahi Sadiq was born to Ali Sadiq. His father served as a commerce wakil to emir Muhammed ibn Ali of the Harar Emirate. Abdullahi in the early 20th century had business ties with the Zeila, Aden, and various other trading routes south of the red sea, where he built his wealth. In 1874 he served as a senior revenue agent (dogin) for the Khedivate of Egypt in the Oromo areas of Harar following the Egyptian invasion of Harar. He was an orphan whose Treasury inheritance Rites have been restored from the Barkhlay guardian and gained the confidence by the Abyssinian Emperor Menelik II and was sent as an envoy to leader of the Dervish state, Mohammed Abdullah Hassan. He is the Prince of Overseers and or Commerce, aka Sovereign Treasurer - from Harar - to Emperor Menelik II. He is sent to the United States of America by Emperor Menelik II as evidenced by New York Times of November 26, 1905. Abdullahi is also regarded as leader of the Muslims of Harar and helped then governor of Hararghe, Haile Selassie foster good relations between Muslims and Christians within the province.

== Political career ==
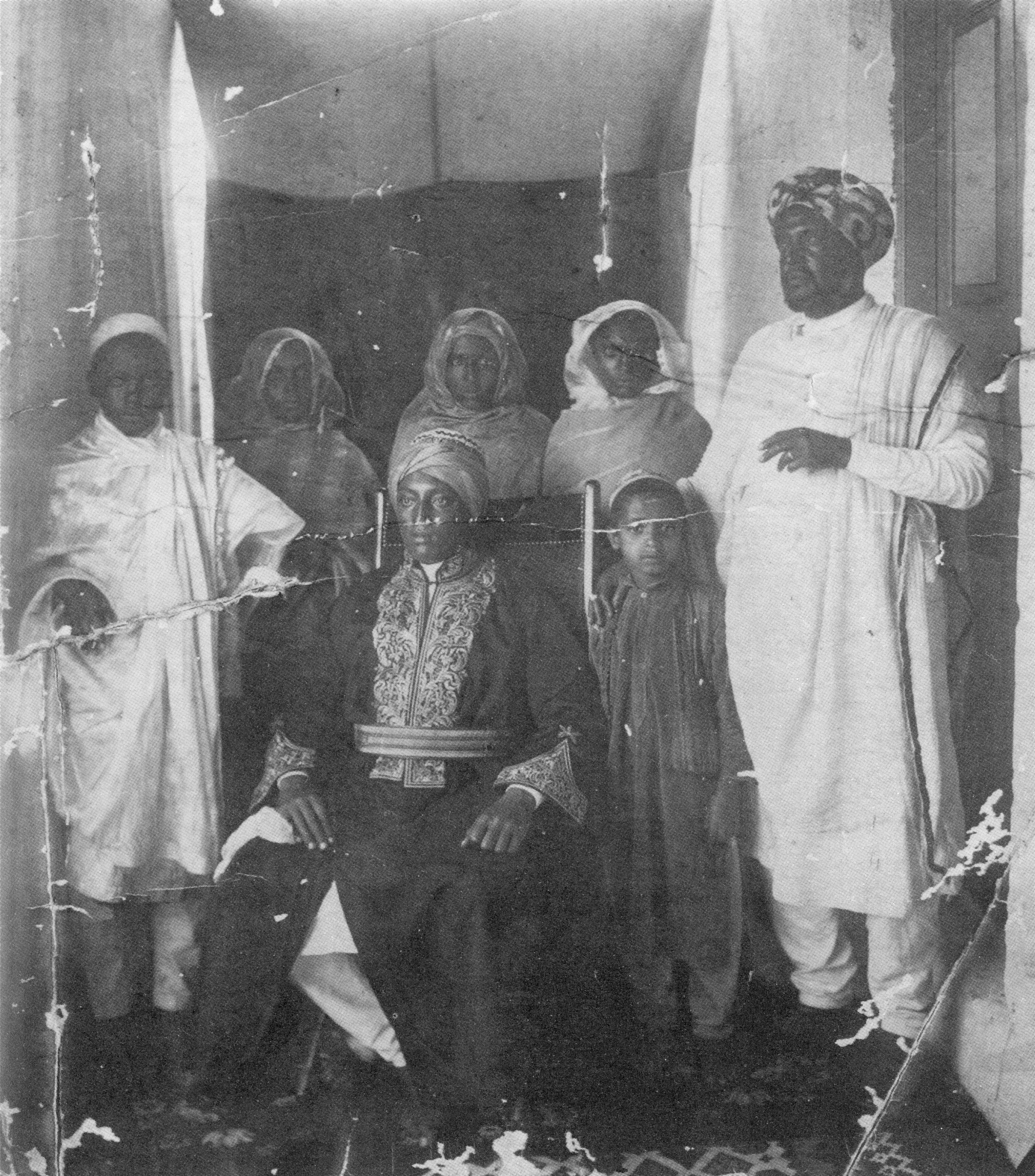
Abdullahi Sadiq (standing far right) and family with Lij Iyasu of Ethiopia (sitting)

He became land administrator in Harar under governor Ras Makonnen in 1889 but was suspended a year later. He then became Prince of Overseers and or Commerce which also brought him to the United States of America in 1905. In 1905 he was leader of the envoy representing emperor Menelik to the United States. In 1906 while visiting British India, he was subsequently arrested by British officers and detained in Zeila. Britain accused Abdullah of supplying weapons to the Dervish State.

Abdullahi was assigned governorship of Ogaden by Lij Iyasu in 1914. Haile Selassie and Abdullah Tahir the governor of Jigjiga detested his appointment. Iyasu used Abdullahi to interact with Dervish leader Mohammed Hassan, which would lead to an alliance between the Dervish and Ethiopian Empire. Dervish State at the time had revolted on the British and this concerned UK about the role Abdullahi was playing. British officer Charles Doughty-Wylie claimed Iyasu's appointment of Abdullahi was signs the Ethiopian government was shifting towards an anti British policy. Abdullahi was also accused of being an international pan Islamic conspirator against the British empire, evidenced by his attempts to reach out to the Emir of Afghanistan. According to professor Haggai Erlich Abdullahi was one of the key figures fostering ties with the Ottoman Empire to bring Ethiopia into World War I on the side of the Central Powers.

== Death ==
After the overthrow of Lij Iyasu, he was arrested in Harar along with several Ughaz of the Somali. Abdullahi was later released from prison, however prior to his release he was allegedly poisoned under the orders of Haile Selassie and died in 1920.
