= Haji Sudi =

Religious leader

Suudi Shabeele Omar Xaaji Suudi Shabeel الحاج سودي شبيل
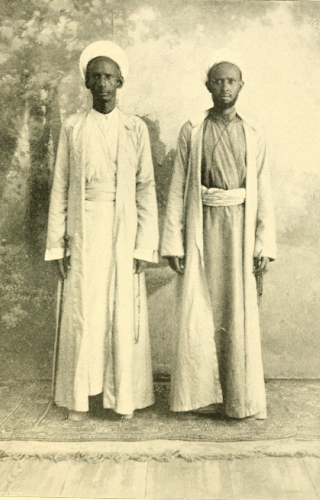
- Haji Sudi on the left with his brother in-law Duale Idres. Aden, 1892.
- Born: 1858; Isaaq Sultanate now Somaliland)
- Died: 1920 (aged 61–62); Taleh, British Somaliland (now Somaliland
- Organization: Dervish movement
- Known for: Commander of the Dervish movement

Suudi Shabeele Omar, more commonly known as Haji Sudi (Somali: Xaaji Suudi Shabeel; 1858–1920) was one of the leaders behind the Somali Dervish movement. He was also the movement's right-hand man and chief lieutenant till its demise in 1920. He is described as the Mullah's right hand in the earlier days of his rise. He hailed from the Adan Madoba, sub-clan of the Habr Je'lo (Isaaq).

== Overview ==
Haji Sudi was born approximately around 1857 in what's now Somaliland, before the arrival of European powers to the Horn of Africa. Nothing is known about his early life, but as most of the Somalis of his time his early life and youth was spent in the interior as a nomad. The nickname "Sudi" in Somali means hot tempered. In Somali language the term means hot or scourging temperature an indication of his temperament. Haji Sudi's real name was Warsame Omar (according to the modern family descendants) but to the British he was known as Ahmed Warsama before the dervish. During his dervish years he was popular as Haji Sudi.

According to Pestalozza (Aden, Yemen, Italian General-counsel and a man who met both the Mullah and Haji Sudi in 1904), Xaaji Suudi had been an Arab interpreter in the British service for twenty-five years in Sawakin, Egypt and Sudan, at the time of the Mahdist movement. He came into disagreement with the British authorities became the most valuable commander of the Sayid. The earliest record of Haji Sudi's life was his Royal Navy stint as an interpreter commencing in the early 1880s. He accompanied William Hewett on his mission to Abyssinia according to Cecil Lowther, who hired him as a guide and a headman for his 1894 big game hunting expedition in Somaliland:

As described by Cecil Lowther in his memoir From Pillar To Post, he was "a tall, slight fellow of thirty-five years of age, with close-shaven head, immense mouth disclosing a row of gleaming teeth, a great man in the estimation of all having three times made the journey to Mecca having a fourth trip in prospect. He had been years in the English Navy as interpreter, and accompanied Admiral Hewitt on his mission to Abyssinia".

In 1884-1885, Haji Sudi spent time as an interpreter during the Suakin Expedition against Osman Digna dervishes directly observing the ways of the Sudanes Dervish during his work abroad HMS Ranger under William Hewett. almost fifteen years later Haji Sudi will teach the Mullah what he learned of the methods of Osman Digna and Muhammad Ahmad Al-Mahdi.

“His purely political adherents were almost solely confined to a few dragomans and disgruntled Somalis residing in Aden, who cherished some personal grudge against the British Government. Typical of these was Haji Sudi, an ex-interpreter of the Royal Navy, who had been at Suakin and was conversant with Dervish customs, many of which he imported into Somaliland. For one and twenty years he was the Mullah's trusty lieutenant".

Haji Sudi was an ex-interpreter of the Royal Navy. He had been at Suakin and was conversant with Dervish ways and had imported many of their customs.

In 1892, he accompanied John Walter Gregory to east Africa, Gregory observing Haji Sudi's habit and manners in 1892-1893 expedition made the following observation regarding his character and his religious, Dervish Zeal.

== A chronology on the beginning of the Dervish movement February-1899-March 1901 ==
In mid-February 1899, Mohammed Abdullah Hassan, later the spiritual head of the Dervish movement, for the first time came to the attention of the British authority at Berbera. James Hayes Sadler updating the colonial office on 12 April 1899, stated that the Somali Coastal Administration initially came to hear about this Mullah of Kob Fardod on mid February 1899, when the new Stipendiary Akil Ahmed Muhammad Shermarki (Habr Yunis, Mussa Arrah) raided some livestock belonging to the religious mullahs of Kob Fardod. This incident brought Sultan Nur to the tariqa at Kob Fardod, after Sultan Madar Hirsi, his rival, assisted the mullahs in recovering the stocks and thus gaining the allegiance and support of the tariqa for his rival sultanate.

Contrary to the fanciful adventure later writers wrote about him, the Mullah only came to the attention of the British in February 1899, he never confronted the authority at Berbera upon arrival in 1895 as some claim, nor were there major uprisings in Berbera as official Somali biographies purport, much of this embellishment was a later invention, beyond a few complaints about not receiving their full herds, the mullahs at Kob Fardod and Mohammed Abdullah Hassan had no complaints against the British coastal administration and even the French Roman Catholic Mission which had been established in Berbera since the early 1890s. Mohamed Abdullah Hassan lived in Berbera and his relatives both Duale Liban, a clerk in Berbera customs, and Deria Magan, a personal translator of the council-general, both held high positions in Berbera administration. Mohammed Abdullah Hassan married a sister of Duale Liban and had his first son Mahdi in Berbera in 1893. Throughout the month of March, the Mullahs peacefully corresponded with the coastal authority in friendly terms, requesting the remainder of their herd.

On March 29, 1899, the vice-council at the coast sent a letter to the Mullah requesting the return of a stolen rifle. The Mullah replied in person to this letter as it was addressed to him personally, denying any knowledge of such a matter.

On April 10, Camel sowar, Ahmed Adan; who carried the letter to the mullah, arrived at Berbera with two replies and made a report to the effect that the assembled mullahs at Kob Fardod and the various tribesmen adopted a hostile attitude and referred to him as a Kafir in addition he reported that a number of them had rifles and were practicing.

On April 20, Dragoman Deria Magan, Hayes Sadler's personal translator and a relative of the Mullah was sent to ascertain the nature of the activities at Kob Fardod. He reported that the Mullah had 52 rifles with about 200 rounds of ammunition and that the various tribesmen Habr Toljaala and Dolbahnata were wavering and they hold no hostile attitude towards the administrations. He added that the Mullah had abandoned the cause of Sultan Madar Hirsi and was now espousing the sultanate of Nur who had recently brought presents and was with him. He also stated that the Mahmood Girad had recently raided the Aligheri.

End of April 1899, the dervish movement was declared adopting the term "dervish" to refer to their core followers not their allied clans-men, and they also announced their independence, having their own Amir, Sultan and chiefs. However, they didn't declare war or open hostility, they merely requested to be respected as an independent community.

End of June 1899, Sultan Nur leaves the tariqa at Kob Fardod and arrives in his country Odweina in an effort to collect arms and men from the western section of the Habr Yunis clan. On June 27, James Hayes Sadler sent a letter to Nur inquiring about his intentions and involvement in the new movement, no reply was received.

In early July 1899, Sultan Nur called for a tribal assembly for the western Habr Yunis on July 22. However, the assembly was aborted when most of the western Habr Yunis clan refused to join the rebellion. Sultan Nur, failing to convince the western Habr Yunis, left eastward to Burao joining the eastern section of the clan who declared allegiance to the new dervish cause.

In the end of August, 1899, the dervish assembled at Burao, declaring an open war. On September 1 a letter arrived from the dervish camp at Burao to Berbera essentially a declaration of war.

In September 1899, after assembling at Burao the Dervish and their clan allies attacked the western Habr Yunis at Odweina under the insistence of Sultan Nur to punish the clansmen who opposed his call to join the rebellion. Also at the end of September they burned and looted the Ahmadia Tariqa at Sheikh.

In October 1899 the chief of the Dolbahnata, Girad Ali Farah, was murdered by the Dervish. The Dolbahnata chief Girad Ali Farah sent a letter to the British Coastal administration disavowing the Mullah's cause and the Dervish rebellion .

In November 1899 the core Dervish forces crossed the border into Ethiopia and settled at Harradiggit (Hara-Digeed). In March 1900, the Dervish allies in the Ogaden were defeated at the battle of Jig Jiga, no dervishes participated in this battle.

In July 1900, The Dervishes loot and raid the Aidagalla clan in Ethiopia.

In August 1900, the dervish attack the habr Awal tribe killing 220 including women and children, losing 130 raiders killed.

In October 1900, a combined various Isaq tribes (Samatar/Ahmed Abdalla, Habr Yunis and Aidagalla) attack the dervish and the Ogaden in retaliations crossing the border into Ethiopia.

In March 1901, the dervish reentered Somaliland protectorate after being pushed out by the Abyssinian forces and their Somali tribal allies ( Mohamed Zubeir Ogaden) from Ethiopia border.

== Joining the Tariqa of Kob Fardod (1897-1898) ==
Haji Sudi retired to the interior of Somaliland in the summer of 1897, after his headman career was abruptly ended after the Somali Coast administration imprisoned him on the recommendations of one Bertram Robert Mitford Glossop a big game hunter. He retired to the interior to his hamlet among his brothers Baashe and Qeybdiid. Sometime between 1897 and 1898 Baashe his brother was killed in a tribal war with the neighboring Dolbahanta clan. Upon capturing Durraan one of the accused Qaybdid (Gaibdeed killed in Ferdiddin battle along with his two sons) chose to release him and instead pursue traditional clan settlement.

Some British colonial records claim that the tariqa of Mohammed Abdullah Hassan interfered and meditated between the two clans thus introducing Sudi to the mullahs community at Kob Fardod, but most likely in late 19 century Somaliland due to the small populations and the nomadic nature of the tribes most notable Somalis knew one another personally. Prior to the period Qaybdid the brother of Sudi married Hassan's paternal aunt, a more likely scenario of Sudi been introduced to the Tariqa at Kob Fardod. Captain McNeill in his book " in pursuit of the Mad Mullah" having faced Haji Sudi, the Mulah and Sultan Nur in the first expeditions narrated this version of Sudi's brother murder and Sudi's joining the Tariqa or Zawiya (institution) at Kob Fardod:

"The way in which he came to be an adherent of Mahomed Abdullah is worthy of mention, as throwing some light on the latter's character, and showing how well he could adopt a conciliatory policy towards those whom he wished to gain over to his side. Ahamed Warsama belonged to the Adan Madoba tribe, and one day, just when the Mullah was beginning to make his power felt, Mullah turned to the latter (Ali Gheri) and threatened to use all his influence, religious and temporal, against them, and to bring down on them all the other tribes who were under his influence unless they obeyed. As the Ali Gheri have very large herds both of sheep and camels, this would have been a grand chance for the neighboring tribes, of which they would not have hesitated to avail themselves. The result of this threat was that the Ali Gheri agreed not only to restore the looted camels, but to pay another hundred as blood -money for the death of Haji Sudi's brother. Thus the latter gained a hundred camels, and the Mullah got as an adherent a man whose experience of the world, and of the British Sahib and his ways, was of the greatest use to him, Haji Sudi having been headman to various expeditions, and having also spent some time as interpreter on an English man-of-war. In addition to Somali he could speak English, Hindustani, Arabic, and Swahili, so he was not a man whose services could be lightly dispensed with. It has often made me think with regret of the many times I could have blown this rascal's head off in 1895 if I had only known! At the same time he might have done the same to me, if he had only known what the future was to be."

“In 1895 after which he returned to his tariga, Kob Fardod, in the Dolbahanta. Here he gradually acquired influence by stopping inter-tribal warfare, and eventually started a religious movement in which the Rer Ibrahim (Mukabil Ogaden) Ba Hawadle (Miyirwalal Ogaden) and the Ali Gheri(Dolbahanta) were the first to join. His emissaries also soon succeeded in winning over the Aden Madoba, notable amongst whom was Haji Sudi, his trusted lieutenant, and Ahmed Farih and reer Yuusuf, all Habr Toljaala, and the Musa Ismail of the Eastern Habr Yunis, with Sultan Nur.”

When did exactly Haji Sudi joined the tariqa at Kob Fardod is not known but its generally between 1896 and 1897 when the mullah Mohammed Abdullah Hassan himself joined the Kob Fardod tariqa. The Kob Fardod mullah settlement had long been there before the dervish rebellion.

By the outbreak of the dervish rebellion in August 1899 Sudi was among the top five (Mohammed Abdullah Hassan, Haji Sudi, Deria Arrale, Deria Gure and Nur Ahmed Aman) wanted leaders of the movement. In his orders to the heads of the military expeditions, Hayes-Sadler the Somaliland coast Consul-General issued the followings as to the future treatments upon surrender of the heads of Dervish:

In the unlikely event of the: Mullah offering to surrender, in his case and that of the Following: Ahmed Warsame known as Haji Sudi Deria Araale Deria Gure Only an unconditional surrender should be accepted, no guarantee of any kind as to future treatment being given. Sultan Nuur the late sultan of the Habar Yunis, may be guaranteed his life. J. Hayes-Sadler, His Britannic Majesty's Consul-General, Somali Coast Protectorate. Aden April 11, 1901.

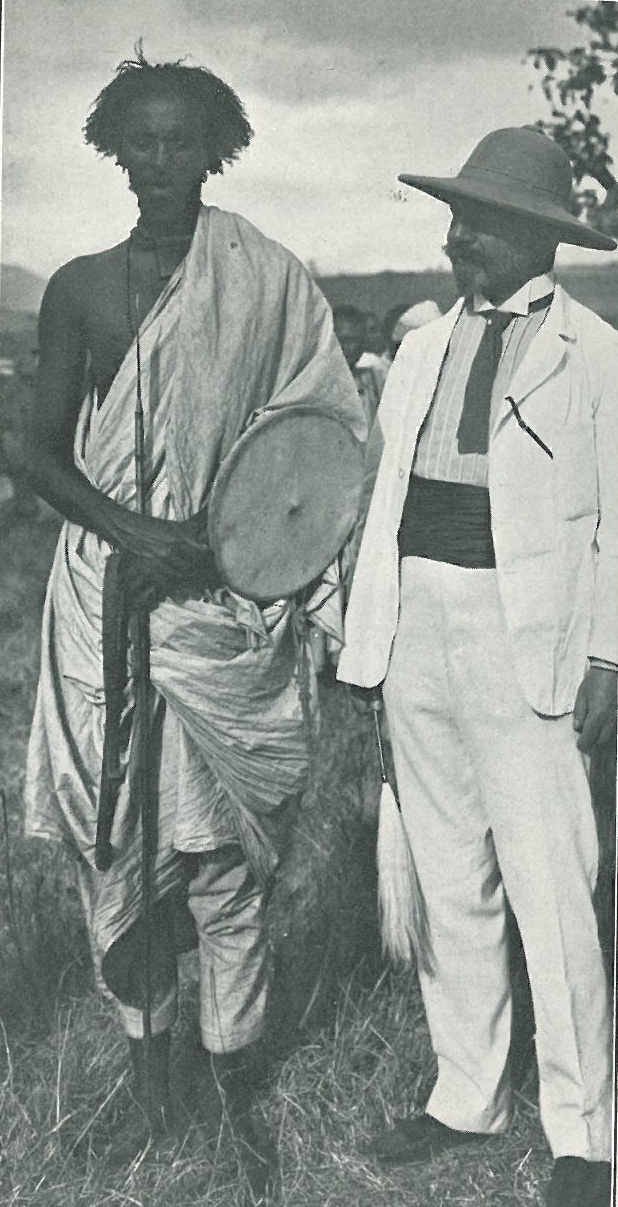
Sheywal Abdi, Habr Awal tribe, a poet and a dervish commander who defected to the English side after a fallout with Sultan Nur, 1905. The dervish murdered his two wives and six children and in retaliation he killed 23 dervishes for revenge

== Samala battle June 2–3, 1903 known as Afbakayle in Somali. ==
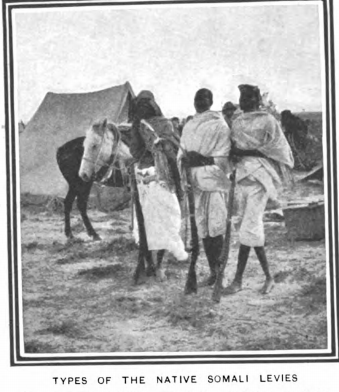
Somali tribal levy

Before dispatching forces to face the Dervish at Samala Consul-General Hayes Salder made the following instructions to the overall commander of the forces

Eric John Eagles Swayne:

"In the unlikely event of the: Mullah offering to surrender, in his case and that of the Following: Ahmed Warsama (known as Haji Sudi), Deria Arale, Deria Gure Only an unconditional surrender should be accepted no guarantee of any kind to future treatment been given. Sultan Nur the late sultan of the Habr Yunis, may be guaranteed his life." J. Hayes-Sadler, His Britannic Majesty's Consul-General, Somali Coast Protectorate. Aden April 11, 1901."

By December 1900, 21 officers of the British and Indian army with a force of 1,500 Somali Levy from the raiding tribes were ready to operate against the dervish in 1901. To prevent the Dervish from fleeing west across the Ethiopian border, Ethiopian cooperation was sought and the Abyssinian king sent a force of 8,000 soldiers in January 1901, the Ethiopian operations began at once, three months before the British expeditions, the Ethiopians managed to push the dervish across the Somaliland border and punish the clans who were involved in assisting the dervish.

On May 22 Swayne's forces on their way burned the entire settlement of Kob Fardod leaving only the mosque. Their next operation was to punish clans that supported the Mullah, they seized 3,500 camels from the Habr Toljaalaa Adan Madoba and the Dolbahanta Jama Siad. On June 2 these tribes, along with dervish forces, attacked McNeill's zariba at Samala to recapture back their herds. On the afternoon of June 2, the dervish attacked McNeil's encampment ( zeriba) with a force of some five hundred horse and two thousand foot. The dervish leaders Haji Sudi, sultan Nur and the Mullah watched the battle from a nearby hill. After have been repulsed with many casualties, the dervish attacked the same night with no avail, on 3 June the following morning at 9:00.A.M the dervish attacked with 5000 strong not been able to get anywhere near the zariba before having been shot, the dervish forces were broken, in the two day fighting the dervish lost 150 dead on the battlefield and counted on the actual scene, the British further claimed they have killed six hundreds, counted dead men who died on the road between Weylahed ( weyl-lagu-xidh here where the subsequently the dervish came face to face with Swayne's flying column ) and Ana Hargili ( Caana-Xadhigle). McNeil lost 18 in killed and wounded.

Failing to regain their stocks, both the dervish and their clan allies retreated on June 3. Subsequently, it came to the knowledge of Swayne that the Mullah initially wanted to attack Swayne's zariba, but Sultan Nur persuaded the dervish that an attack on McNeill's zariba would yield some 400 rifles. The fleeing Dervish accidentally encountered the column of Swayne on 4 June, here at Weylahed a small skirmishes took place ending with a prolonged chase of the fleeing scattered dervish horsemen, but the dervish managed to escape. The pursuit continued until the dervish crossed into the Haud. A reporter from The London Times on June 22, 1901, sent a report of the campaigns describing the next encounter after Samala:

"Prisoners asserted that the Mullah had sworn on the Koran to attack us that day, whatever the consequences might be, and Colonel Swayne, therefore, determined to anticipate him. We prepared to attack the largest body—that on the left side of the valley. The Camel Corps and Mounted Infantry at once moved out, and had proceeded some three miles, when scouts reported that the whole plain beyond the hill was simply swarming with men, both horse and foot, and that an attack' by the Mullah himself, with a large body of cavalry, on the rear of the column, was imminent. It was at once decided to zariba all the transport at the foot' of a small hill under the protection of two companies, and to engage the whole of the enemy with the remainder. Captain Mereweather, with a portion of the Mounted Infantry, was sent back to cover this movement of a large body of the ~ enemy's cavalry began to enter the' valley by an opening in the hills in the rear of our force. They advanced on the Mounted Infantry, firing as they came. The remainder of the Mounted Infantry and the Camel Corps were then reinforced by Captain. Mereweather, and after a few rounds from the Maxim the enemy began to move towards a defile' in the hills. The Mounted and Camel Corps at once started off at a hard galloping pursuit, and' after exciting long chase of about six miles caught up the enemy at the entrance to a "deep gorge in the hills". At this point some 20 of the enemy were slain, their losses killed during the pursuit being about 100. Our losses were two killed, five wounded, and seven horses killed. The retreat -here became a total rout. As the enemy went ' they dropped rifles and ammunition. Much of their ammunition is of the most deadly kind, flat-nosed bullets, split bullets, and soft-nosed bullets, with crosses cut in the tips, figuring prominently. It appeared certain that all three of the enemy's leaders were in front of our men. Namely, the Mad Mullah himself, Haji Sudi, and Sultan Nur, and we needed no further incentive to do our best. At intervals, hand to land fights took place, and the losses of the enemy were evinced by the number of riderless horses”.

Subsequently, the British forces concluded from the dervish casualties the implicated clans and found out that the bulk of the dervish forces at Samala were of the sub clans of Kayat, Aadan Madoba, Rer Hagar, Ali Gheri, Nur Ahmed, Jama Siad, and Mijjarten. On June 19 Sawayne decided to punish the refractory clans by ceasing their herds, the Jama Siad and Rer Hagar easily came to terms, by July 8 the operations concluded where the Ali Gheri losing some 60 men and some 6,000 camels the last clans came to submission and their elders came to Berbera.

== Ferdiddin July 17, 1901 ==
Recrossing the border from the Haud into Italian Somalia in the Mudug region, the Mullah collected his most fanatical followers the real dervish ( men who were mostly mullahs and under oath to fight to the end as opposed to tribal opportunistic clan allies ), the dervish withdrew from Mudug and arrived back into British Somaliland and encamped in Beretabli. Swayne arriving at Courgerod with his forces made contacts with the rear of the enemies and spies later discover the bulk of the enemy forces were in force in Firidddin. Swayne chose to attack at early down travelling through the night, with 700 men 75 mounted and 100 left behind to guard the supplies, Swayne attacked with 600 men and 350 Dolbahnata tribesmen, they attacked the Dervish at Ferdiddin. Sawyne described the fight at Firdiddin in his official correspondence:

“On getting this news I moved my force from Bohotele via Yaheyl and Weyla Hedd to Firdiddin, and attacked the Mullah at later place. The Mullah's Mijjertein riflemen were in considerable strength with Lebel and Martini-henry rifles. His force were however scattered, and he himself was driven back into Italian territory. The Mijjertein lost heavily, and also the Mullah's own family. His brother-in-law, Gaibdeed, was killed, as well as two sons-in-law, Haji Sudi's brother and nephews, &c. Sultan Nur's camels and the Mullah's cattle were captured. The pursuit was carried on into the bush in the Haud”.

Gaibdeed and two of his sons (been the brother of Haji Sudi and nephews) were among the leaders killed. The dervish lost a large numbers of well known mullahs and over 60 bodies counted. The fleeing dervish fared no better after five days in the waterless Haud many died and Haji Sudi, the Mullah and his eldest son only survived by water from the stomach of slaughtered camels. After the defeat the enemy fled south across the Italian border and were pursued some miles the forces had to stop to regroup. Short of water and some 50 miles away from their nearest supplies Swayne was compelled to abort the pursuit. Facing the authentic dervish mostly mullahs, Swayne was impressed by their tenacity and ferocity commenting :

“I was impressed with the danger of the Dervish movement. Until I actually saw the Mullah’s men fighting, I had no idea that a Somali could be so influenced by fanaticism. I am speaking of the Dervishes, the men who, following the custom of the Suakin Dervishes, have thrown over father and mother and their own tribe to follow the Mullah. They have passwords, wear a white turban and special bravery, and have sworn to throw up all worldly advantages. Of course a certain number even of these Dervishes have joined the Mullah simply for the sake of loot, but there are, on the other hand, a considerable number who are pure fanatics. At Ferdiddin and at McNeil's Zeriba these were the men who led and who were shot down. At Ferdiddin, after the others had fled, a number of these men remained behind to fight to end, and were shot down as we advanced. When recording the name of the enemy’s dead, I found that a large number were Hajis or Sheikhs.”

== Erigo/Erego October 6–7, 1902. ==
In December 1901 the Dervish raided the a sub sections of the Habr Tojaalaa and on February 1, 1902, news reached the Somaliland protectorate British authority that the Dervish were planning a raid against the tribes from their positions east of the protectorate. On February 7 and 13, the dervishes waged a devastating attack on Habr Yunis and Dolbahnata tribes men east of Burao. The London Gazette reported "On the 7th February, the Mullah had despatched another raiding force against our Jama Siad friendly tribes, 100 miles to the east of the scene of his raid of the 13th February, and here again our tribes suffered heavily. Burao and Berbera became filled with destitute refugees and 2000 persons were fed daily at Burao alone. 1903

In the first week of October the Somali and Yoas led by few British officers at last arrived within the reach of their enemies. They formed a Zariba in a clearing Awan Eergo in a very dense bush, and around 4 pm the enemy were hiding in all the surrounding bushes. The British led forces were compelled to advance slowly, immediately the Dervish attacked from all directions causing the British led forces front line to fall back in a disarray, but the rear companies stood firm holding their position, the 2nd King African Rifles and 6th King Africans Rifles in the extreme right and left, fell back in a sudden panic, rescued by one-half company in the front the troops rallied and held their ground under intense fire. In the severity of the fight the transport camels stampeded with the 2nd African Rifles and two Somali companies Ltd Swayne managed to push the enemies for 2 miles and recover 1,800 of the transport camels. in the aftermath of the battle it was discovered a maxim gun was missing, casualties included 2 officers killed and 56 levies. Both the Somali and Yoa performed great in the 6th but on 7 October the severity of the fight sunk their spirit and the officers leading the forces complained that they couldn't rely on their men. The dervish in the other hand lost greatly, some 62 death 40 of them Hajis and Mullahs and all 6 commanders of their force were killed.

In the western side of the protectorate the highest Somali native officer Risaldar-major Musa Farah attacked the dervish tribal allies, "By June 10, Musa Farah's detached Levy of 450 rifles had reached Kurmis. After collecting 5,000 tribesmen from the western side of the Protectorate, Musa Farah had transported them across the waterless Haud where it was over 100 miles broad, had attacked the western Dervish encampments, had routed them in all directions, and had finally succeeded in transporting his force back across the Haud, together with his captured livestock, amounting to 1,630 camels, 200 cows, and 2,000 sheep. For this service His Majesty King Edward VII rewarded the Risaldar-Major with a sword of honour.

At the conclusion of the first and second expeditions, the British administrations and the colonial office were satisfied at the conclusion of the first two expeditions, despite the leaders of the Dervish having not all been either killed or captured. Gabriel Ferrand, the Vice-Council of France following these events observed that "Neither the Mahdi nor his chief advisor Ahmed Warsama, better known under the name Haji Sudi, nor the Sultan Nur, leader of the Habr Younis clan were killed or captured. The optimism Colonel Sadler and Lieutenant-Colonel Swayne in the latest reports relating to military operations is inexplicable."

== Gumburu April 17, 1903 and Daratoleh April 22, 1903 ==
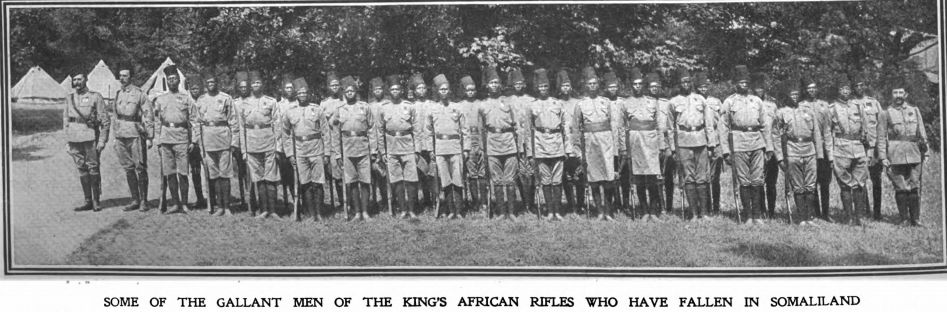
King's African Rifles

The third expedition was launched January 3, 1903 with a new commander, Sir William Henry Manning. The plane was to encircle and trap the dervish from all sides. The main body of the forces were to advance from Obbia in Italian Somalia to the wells of Galkayo while one land at Berbera and form lines through Bohotleh. The dervish leaders, upon hearing news of the Obbia forces landing with a body of horsemen, left for Milmil and Haradiggitt rallying tribal allies:

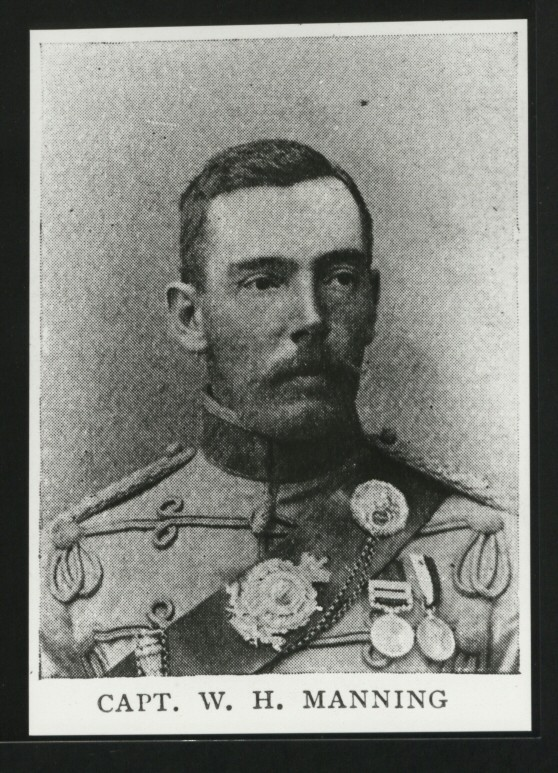
The National Archives UK - CO 1069-111-7

Towards the end of March news reached the British forces of whereabouts the bulk of the dervish forces. Defectors and captives claimed the dervish forces were in Galadi. A reconnaissance patrol led by captain Plunkett was sent by Manning to Galadi where they met the bulk of the dervish forces majority made of Somali Bantu clans of the Makana and Derjele tribes. Between 16 and 17 April the British small forces made up of Somalis, Indians and Yaos were encircled from all directions and decimated. All 9 officers were killed and 89 rank and file were killed. The battle took place in a small hill Gumburu close to Galadi. Before the news of the disaster at Gumburu made it to the British forces another column from Bohotleh forces engaged another dervish forces at Daratoleh the later forces were defeated by the British forces.

The bulk of the main dervish forces without their tribal allies moved to Halin in June 1903; according to the intelligence report of the period:

"A deserter from the enemy stated that the Mullah. accompanied by Haji Sudi and Sultan Nur, with a large force of horse and footmen, reached Kurmis on 8th June, camped near Lasakante on 9 June, and moved towards Dannot early on 10 June on their way towards the Nogal. On 12th June mounted scout could not get through from Bohotle to Dannot owing to the numbers of the enemy's horsemen watching the road. On 13th June two deserters from the mullah came into Bohotle and stated that the Mullah with his whole force was on his way to Nogal with a view of establishing his Haroun at Halin. Intelligence Report from 11th July 1903".

4 August 1903. — a deserter from the Mullah, named Abbas Isman (Ibrahim), came into Bohotle at 5.30 a.m. His story is as follows Haji Sudi is still his trusted adviser. Sultan Nur still lives with the Mullah, but no longer is keen to help him. Abbas was with the Mullah at Wardair during the fight. When the fight was over a horseman galloped to Wardair and announced that the English had been wiped out. The Mullah immediately mounted his pony, Dodimer and rode hard to the field of battle. The Mullah was absent from the battle and much of the command of the dervish fighters fell upon Sultan Nur. This fact caused the rift between the Mullah and Sultan Nur which the informant alluded to in his report.

These two encounters, despite a heavy loss by the dervish, were the only dervish victory over the British forces.

== Jidballi January 10, 1904. ==
This was not the mere handful they had fought at Samala, at Gumburu, or at Daratoleh. It was no reconnaissance, nor yet was it a hastily recruited tribal levy such as they had faced at Ferdhiddin or Erigo. In comparison, General Egerton's force at Jidbali must have seemed to them a mighty army; and, in very truth, it comprised some of the best seasoned British, Indian, and African troops at the Empire's disposal. On the other hand, the Darwishes numbered from 6000 to 8000 fighting men, representing the pick of the Mullah's forces.

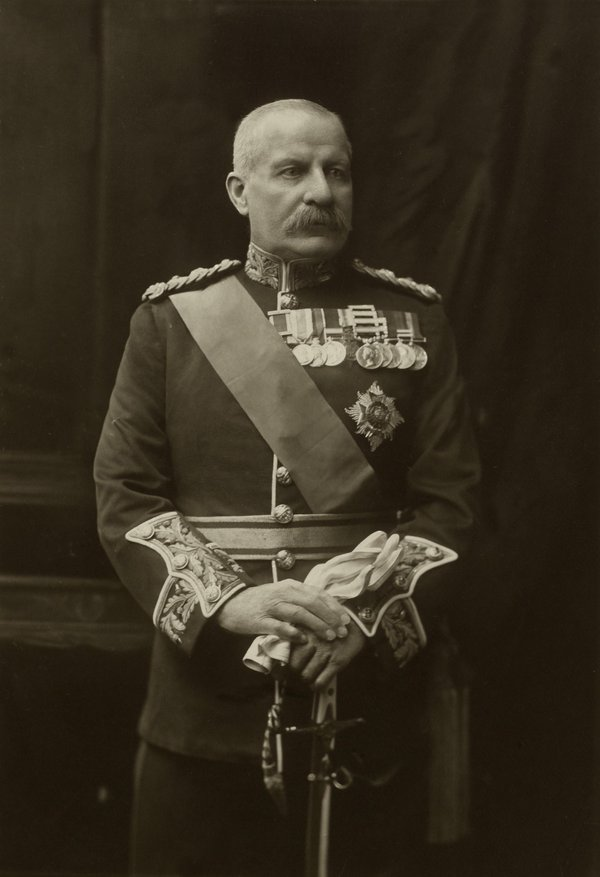
Sir Charles Egerton

The command of the British forces was taken over by major-general Charles Egerton with fresh reinforcement from India and Aden, on July 4, 1903, Egerton arrived at Berbera. From his arrival to mid October Egerton was engaged in improving roads, building an advance bases at kirrit and improving water supplies. Also Egerton raised two more Somali irregular mounted corps, the Gedabursi Horse ( 500 men from the Gedabursi clan) and the Tribal Horse (mainly from eastern Habr Yunis, Habr Tojalaa and Dolbahnata clans). Meanwhile, the dervish were encamped at Halin-Gerrowei-Kalis line of villages and they made Halin their main headquarter. In October the Dervish occupied the small port at Illig in the Mijjertein coast.

Manning was given orders to occupy Galadi and by end of November 1903 Galadi was occupied without incidents. The water insufficient, Manning left a detachments there and stationed the bulk of his troops at Bohotle. The first clashes between the Dervish and British forces occurred in December 1903 when news came that the Dervish camp was formed at Jidbali. Egerton ordered lieutenant-Colonel Kenna to make a reconnaissances and to induce the Dervish in an engagement. Coming upon many dervish camp fires at Jidbali, Kenna opened fire in an attempt to dislodge the dervishes from their zaribas. After three hours of periodic fires Kenna withdrew estimating the enemy force to consist of around 1,500 foot and 200 horsemen.

On 9 January, Egerton assembled his massive forces 20 miles east of Badwein having ascertained the dervish were in force in Jidbali. On 10 January 1904, the dervish for the first time fought regular troops in an open country, also in terms of numbers of troops the British forces were the largest thus far. The Mullah was not present in the battle, he was curiously absent. Sending Kenna to the flank of the enemy to block any retreats, Egerton opened his mountain battery guns orderings his troops to kneel or lay down. Upon the commencing of the fight the dervish rushed from cover to cover to through grass and brushes attacking the left. However they were unable to stand the intensity of the fire, the dervish again regrouped and tried to attack from the front and the right. Sergeant Gibbs did an excellent job with the maxim gun, and the K.A.R and Sikh firing was remarkable, with in few minutes the dervish line collapsed and they retreated in full flight, pursued by the mounted Gedabursi Horses and Tribal Horses the rout of the dervish army was completed.

== Dervish activities 1905–1919 ==
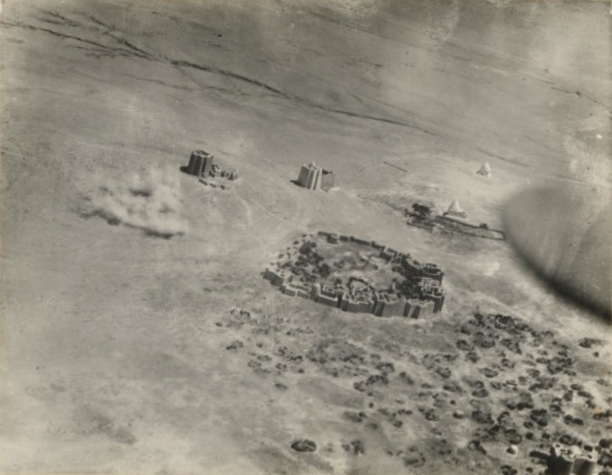
Aerial bombardment of Dervish forts in Taleh

On March 28, 1905, the Italian Ambassador in London informed the British Foreign Office that an Agreement had been reached at Illig on the 5 March between Cavaliere Pestalozza and the dervish at Illig. immediately not long after the Dervish resumed their old method of raiding Somali clans in particular and almost exclusively the Daarood clan which the Mullah himself belonged to.

1914: a telegram from Commissioner of the Somaliland Protectorate to Secretary of State for the Colonies 13 August 1914, stated an anticipated Dervish concentration in the Ain has not materialised. No further developments reported from Jidali except successful spread of Dervish propaganda in that locality by the ex naval interpreter Haji Sudi.

According to Hastings Ismay during his years in service in Somaliland from 1915 to 1920. In March 1917 haji Sudi began building Surud forts.

== Haji Sudi's death; the last expedition 1920 ==
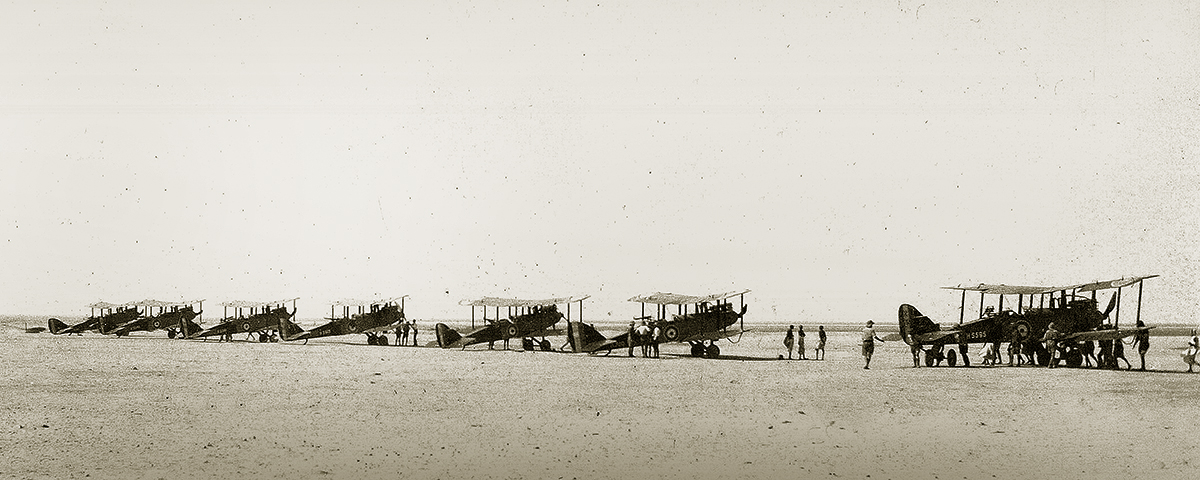
De Havilland D.H.9s of the RAF's Z Unit line up for a mission against Mohammed bin Abdullah Hassan, (RAF Museum, Hendon)

During the last campaign on January 21, the attack began with the bombing of Medishi and Jidali fort in the Surad mountain ranges. Haji Sudi along with the Mullah and various top dervish were residing in Medishi fort during the first strike most of the dervish forts in Surad ranges (Jid Ali, Boran, Medishi and Galbaribur on the coast) were bombed. In the ensuing confusion of the dervish Haji Sudi with commander Ibrahim Bogol endeavored to regroup forces and gathered livestock and headed south to Taleh fort, while the Mullah in his initial shock fled and hid in a nearby cave. On the 5th or 6 February Haji Sudi forces along with the northern dervish commander Ibrahim Bogol engaged in a fight with the Somali tribal forces of 500 led by Risaldar Major Haji Musa Farah. Haji Sudi and Ibrahim Bogol both leaders of the dervish forces were killed. ."

== See also ==
- Sultan Nur Ahmed Aman
- Ibrahim Boghol
- Mohammed Abdullah Hassan
- Somaliland Campaign
