= Huseen Dhiqle =

Huseen Dhiqle, also spelled Xuseen Dhiqle, was the memorizer of the orations and poems of the Sayid, as well as his successor at the 1921 Darawiish community at Iimey. Huseen Dhiqle had an eidetic memory whereby he could memorize and recite upwards of 100 of the Sayid's poems upon hearing it once. African studies professor John William Johnson stated that Dhiqle's replacement of the Sayid after his death at Iimey was for a short period of time:

One of the Sayid's assistants (and the man who succeeded him as leader of the Dervishes for a short time after Maxamed's death) was entrusted with the duty of memorizing Maxamed Cabdille's poetry during his lifetime

— John William Johnson

== Career ==
Huseen Dhiqle hails from the Ogaden clan and Andrzejewski described Huseen Dhiqle as the most important or chief memorizer of the Sayid's orations and poems. According to John L. Loughran, Huseen Dhiqle's memorization consisted firstly of learning an oration or poem of the Sayid by heart, and subsequently he would center himself around other memorizers so that they could proliferate the oration or poem to the other Somalis at large.

The pseudonymous title of the poem Afbakayle is Xuseenow Caqligu Kama Baxo which literally means "Oh Huseen (Dhiqle), your memory never fails you". The first part of the poem discusses Huseen Dhiqle's eidetic memory; the rest discusses the xenophilia or Uncle Tom syndrome tendencies present in many Somalis, and the evils of the scramble for Africa. In 1955, the Darawiish veteran Cabdi-Yaar Guuleed from Buhoodle described Huseen Dhiqle as a man of profound intelligence and stated that he died in the year 1923 in Gindhir (Ginir) in the Bale Zone of the Oromia.
