= Hasna Doreh =

Somali commander of the Dervish State

Hadsan Doreh حادسن دوريه
- Born: 1860s Hobyo
- Died: Taleh Dervish State
- Organization: Dervish State
- Political party: Dervish movement
- Spouse: Mohammed Abdullah Hassan

Hadsan Doreh (Somali: Xaadsan Dooreeh, Arabic: حادسن دوريه) was an early 20th-century Somali female commander of the Dervish State, a state which frequently engaged in battles against the imperial powers during the Somali campaign. Female Darwiish such as her were referred to as Darwiishaad or Darawiishaad.

== Biography ==
Doreh was the wife of Mohammed Abdullah Hassan, who assigned her one of the nine divisions of the Dervish army.

In his biography of Muhammad Abdullah Hassan and Hassan's Dervish comrades, the author Ray Beachey compared Doreh to the ancient British Queen Boadicea in her struggle against the Roman Empire.
