= Battle of Jigjiga (1900) =

First battle between Dervish Movement and the Ethiopian Empire

- Part of Menelik II's expansions and the Ethiopian–Somali conflict
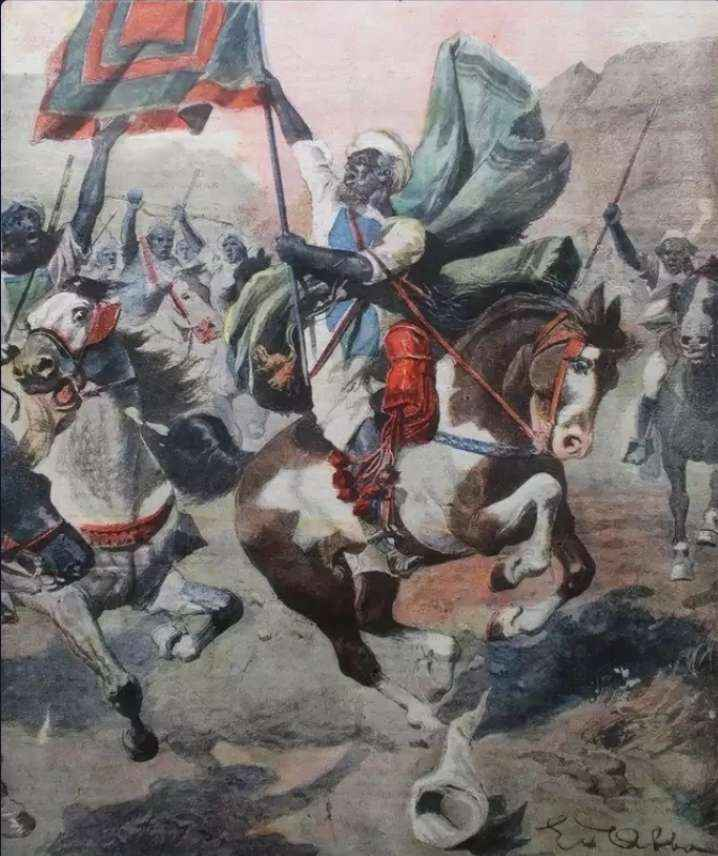
- The Sayyid carrying the Dervish standard with his followers by La Tribuna Illustrata
Date	March 5, 1900
Location	Jigjiga, Ogaden, Ethiopia
Result	Dervish victory

Belligerents
Dervish State	Ethiopian Empire

Commanders and leaders
Mohamed Hassan	(Ethiopian Empire) Grazmatch Bente

Strength
6,000 spearmen	1,500 riflemen

Casualties and losses
Disputed (Note: Estimates on casualties during the battle vary widely. The Dervishes suffered 170 fatalities and many more injured. Other reports indicate that more than 2500 casualties. The Ethiopians claimed to have killed 2,800 Dervish troops during the battle, but according to Professor of African History Raphael Chijioke Njoku the veracity of the reported number of deaths is suspicious.)	Unknown

The Battle of Jigjiga was fought on March 5, 1900, between the Ethiopian Empire and the Dervish State.

The Dervishes, led by Sayyid Mohamed Hassan, stormed a military fort at the Somali city of Jigjiga in the Ogaden region with the objective of repossessing livestock looted from locals by an Abyssinian military expedition. The clash marked the first major battle of the Dervish movement and the opening of a two decade long war against the Ethiopian Empire.

The battle greatly shook the Ethiopians, and resulted in them coordinating large scale joint military operations with the British Empire against the Dervishes in the following years.

== Background ==
Between 1890 and 1899, Ethiopian Emperor Menelik II began a campaign of indiscriminate raids and attacks against the Somalis of the Ogaden region. Somali clans residing in the plains of Jigjiga were in particular targeted. The escalating frequency and violence of the raids resulted in Somalis consolidating behind the Dervish Movement under the lead of Sayyid Mohamed Abdullah Hassan. Imperial military expeditions dispatched into the Ogaden engaged in the torching of Somali settlements, and foreign travellers in the region widely reported countless stories of suffering at the hands of the Abyssinian invaders. Towards the end of 1899, the Dervishes began to systemically ambush and loot Ethiopian caravans traversing the Ogaden. In response the Abyssinian's sent an expedition to deal with them.

As the Ethiopian Empire began expanding into Somali territories at the start of the 1890s, Jigjiga came under intermittent military occupation until 1900. At the start of the year, Abyssinian troops occupied the town and completed construction on a fort.

== Battle ==
Towards the end of 1899, the Dervishes began to systemically loot Ethiopian caravans traversing the Ogaden. In response the Ethiopian sent an expedition to deal with them. Failing to locate the Dervishes, they instead indiscriminately looted the local Somalis for their cattle.

In response, Mohammed Abdullah Hassan recruited an army of 6,000 Somali spearmen and attempted to storm the Ethiopian garrison at Jigjiga to recover all the stolen herds. According to I. M. Lewis, the Dervishes invaded Jijiga in March 1900, however accounts of the battle differ. According to the Ethiopians, the Dervishes were almost completely defeated and suffered a heavy loss amounting to 2,600 killed. Grazmatch Bente describes the fight as follows: "Their numbers were innumerable. The fight did not last five minutes before they fled, followed by our soldiers, who destroyed them, but he (the Mullah) hid himself, and it is said that he did not join the force against us. A few of his force escaped, some on horseback, and others running and seeking for the safety of their lives have been made prisoners."

However, according to British accounts, despite only being armed with spears against 1,500 well equipped riflemen, the Dervishes were able to penetrate the zariba in broad daylight, and recovered all of livestock that the Ethiopians had taken from the Somalis before withdrawing. Thus proving to both the British and the Ethiopians that they were a force to be reckoned with. After the engagement, the British Vice-Consul at Harar reported: "The Abyssinians, it seems, fear the Somalis very much. I have never seen men so afraid as they are now; they have given rifles to the children to show they have troops her." After this engagement, the Sayyid and his followers remained in the Ogaden. They began to raid the Eidagale and Mohamed Zubeyr clans until another Ethiopian expedition in March 1901 forced them to withdraw to the Dhulbahante country in the Nugaal Valley.

== Legacy and aftermath ==
Both sides claimed victory following the battle. Although suffering heavy casualties during the attack, the Dervishes accomplished their objective of returning all the livestock confiscated by the Abyssinians. The battle had 'established without a doubt' that the Dervishes were now a force to be reckoned with. Despite losses incurred, the battle did nothing to lessen the stature of Muḥammad ibn 'Abdallāh Hassan among Somali clans.

After this engagement, the Sayyid became the virtual master of the whole Ogaden region and gained a high status among the Muslims who considered the Negus of Abyssinia their common enemy. Following this success, the Dervishes began to raid the Mahmuhd Zubeyr and Aidgalle clans of Ogaden region. After the raid, the movement had become an international problem. The battle made British colonial authorities realize the severity of the Dervish threat. Shaken and also recognizing the new threat, the Ethiopians proposed joint British-Abyssinian military operations against the Dervishes.
