= Afbakayle =

1905 poem by Mohammed Abdullah Hassan

Afbakayle is a 1905 poem by the Sayid Mohammed Abdullah Hassan made while he was in exile. The poem is a political poem which primarily deals with the topic of treachery and two-facedness, known as jeesjeesnimo in Somali. According to scholar Abdulqadir Sheik Abdi, the poem is a direct denunciation of those described as "friendly tribes" by the British, whom he describes as the Sayid's sworn arch-enemies. A repeated mantra in the poem used to describe the Somali colonial collaborators is naga ajoon waayey, meaning won't even flinch.

The poem Afbakayle is named after the first ever confrontation between the British colonial army and Darawiish. Afbakayle was a week-long battle of which the first phase pitted the Jama Siad Dhulbahante clan under a Darawiish banner against a British force under major Beynon.

== Name and background ==
The long version of the name of this poem is Xuseenow caqligu kaama baxo which literally means, Oh Huseen, your intellect never falters. The name Afbakayle, the shortened version title of the poem literally means the Hare's Mouth. This is in reference to the name of a week-long battle from 30 May 1901 which through to June 1901 between Darawiish forces and the British Empire's army and their African, including Somali conscripts.

The Afbakayle battle was the first confrontation between the British colonial army and the Darawiish. The first phase of that battle occurred on 30 May between Jama Siad Dhulbahante tribe under the Darawiish banner and the British colonial army under captain-major Beynon. A British war report described the Jama Siad Dhulbahante fighting against Major Beynon, the first Darawiish-British battle, as occurring on 30 May 1901:

Hearing from prisoners that some encampments of the Jama Siad section of the Mahmud Gerad tribe were some 50 miles off, near Mayo, on the left of the line of advance to Yahelli, Swayne seized the opportunity and sent off the mounted corps under Major Beynon to surprise them ... at Samala on arrival at 30 May, when news was brought in that the mounted corps had succeeded in surprising the Jama Siad sections of the Mahmud Gerad and capturing some stock.

— H. O. Arnold-Forster

The act of producing poetry and orations by Sayid Mohamed is usually chronicled to the post-Jidbaali period. In the 106th verse of the poem Gaala-leged, the Sayid claims to speak on behalf of the contemporaneous supreme garaad of the Ciid-Nugaal, Diiriye Guure; suggesting that the Sayid considered the Darawiish king Diiriye Guure as holding a senior rank.

== Lines ==
=== Dhiqle ===
The first verse of the poem introduces Huseen Dhiqle and the poem initially directly speaks to Huseen Dhiqle. This section mostly discusses accusations levelled against Africans being shipped from all over the continent to fight Darawiish of being enablers of colonization, and extends this sentiment to Somalis who it further describes as nihilistic and hedonistic:

1 Xusenow caqligu kaama baxo, idam Ilaahaye
9 Eedaanka maqal waa salaad, loo addimayaaye
10 Ilaahi abuurba kuwii diiday, amarkiisa
11 Ambiyaalihii iyo kuwii, awliyada caayay
12 Asxaabti dariiqada kuwii, awlaxa u qaaday
13 Ikhyaarkooda nimankii kufriga, uga adeegaayey
14 Aan lagu igraahine kalgacal, ugu abraaraayey

Translation:

1 Oh Huseen, may God preserve your eidetic memory, that gift of yours
9 Listen to my words, that of a notice for hearkening
10 they reject any call for sacred injunctions
11 those who utter blasphemy against saintly people
12 those who raised a deadly spear (awlax) against followers of the (Salihiya) correct tariqa
13 those who of their own volition chose to be the doormat of the colonizer
14 again, not out of coercion, but of their own volition, they strive to coddle to the colonizer!

=== Prime minister Aw Cabbaas Xuseen ===
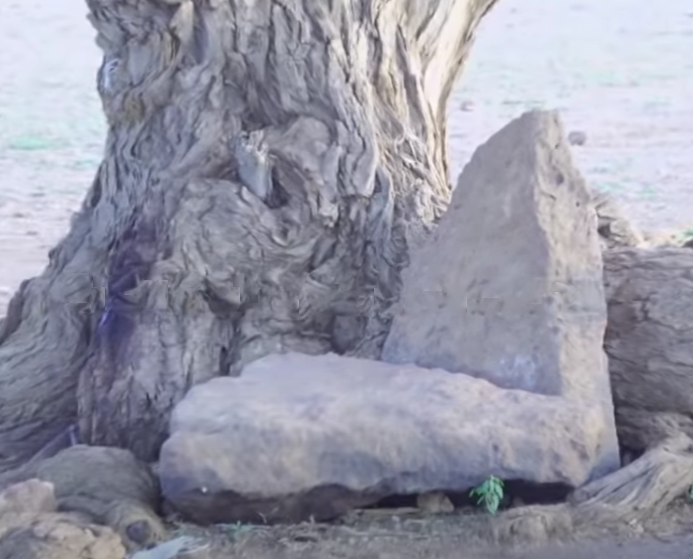
The seat of Darawiish prime minister Aw Cabbaas Xuseen stone at Gurdumi was where Aw Cabbaas Xuseen sat a meeting with the Huwan where he was ultimately killed.

The person directly addressed in the following verses of this poem is Aw Cabbaas Xuseen Muuse, the first person to be killed for being a Darawiish in the fledgling moments of the 19th century when Aw Cbbaas Xuseen chaired a meeting with the Huwan as spokesperson for Darawiish. Aw Cabbaas Xuseen's death was significant as he was the first Darawiish prime minister:

Subeer elders secretly plotted to assassinate the Sayyid and the entire khusuusi council. Word of the conspiracy, however, leaked out before the assassination was carried out and the Sayyid leapt on his swift pony and escaped, but his prime minister and long-time friend, Aw 'Cabbas, fell to the conspirators.

15 Kuwii ubad nasaaraad noqdee, ferenji aanaysatay
16 Nimankii amxaara u kacee, Adarinuu guurey
17 Oo Aw-Cabbaas diley, dadkaan eedi kala gaarin
18 Oo uunka kala fiijiyee, kala irdheysiiyey

Translation:

15 those who ask to be adopted into a Christian foster home, and kowtow to their European overlords
16 those who made themselves rootless by moving to Harar and dissimulating as Amhara Abyssinians
17 those who cruelly murdered Aw Abbas, that innocent pacifist soul
18 and those who fermented the current discord and inharmoniousness

=== Xenophilia & Uncle Toms ===
The following subset of verses speak about xenophilia and the demeanour of the Uncle Tom syndrome among the some African natives during the Scramble for Africa campaign. It also describes the people of Huwan as accomplices to Abyssinian eastward expansionism:

19 Nimankii amxaara u kacee, Adarinuu guurey
20 Oo Mililikh aabbe u yehee, u arrin qaadaayo
21 Oo xabashi eegi u noqdee, u ololaynaayey
22 Ingiriiska nimankii wadee, nagu aseebaayey
23 Afbakayle nimankii wadee, nagu aseebaayey
24 Ee Oodagooyiyo na dhigay, aydii Daratoole
25 Nimankii ikhwaankii jaree, aabiga u laayey
26 Ragga ehelukheyrkaa warmaha, kala ajoon waayey
27 Oo umal daraaddiis girliga, ugu afuufaayey
28 Idilkoodba nimankii dagaal, iigu imaanaayey
29 Nimankaan inkaaree madfaca, ololi ii haysatey

Translation:

19 those who made themselves rootless by moving to Harar and dissimulating as Amhara Abyssinians
20 those whom believe that Menelik II is their dad, whom endorse him as if he's a guiding light
21 those whom are wannabe Ethiopians, who toot the horn for this notion
22 those who spied for the British imperialist, then showed them our hiding places!
23 those who directed them to Afbakayle, and highlighted where we were
24 those who illuminated our hideouts at Oodagooye (near Las Anod), and Daratoole, an uninhabitable wasteland
25 those who broke the back of upstanding honorable men, then slaughtered them
26 those who didn't even flinch before massacring the innocent (Darawiish)
27 those who released endless rounds of ammunition from heavy machine guns on crowds of naysayers to colonisation
28 who would only ever visit me for the purpose of fighting
29 they, curses and damnation be upon them, have the crosshairs of their cannons fixed upon me

=== Ubahadday ===
This section of verses speaks about the Ubaxcadday or Ubahadday of Harti. Ubahadde literally means fair-skinned flower, and the Ubahadday of Harti refers to a gaashaanbuur or confederation between the Dhulbahante and Warsangeli clans, both subsets of the Harti. Verse 30 of the oration Afbakayle says that Ubahcadde people were the ones executed en masse by the colonial forces, and by extension insinuating that Ubaxcadday were the Darawiish. Since the Afbakayle oration was released in the year 1905, this means that the Ubahadday confederation was in effect during this year, coinciding with the time when the Sayid married Bullo Shubato, the sister of Mohamoud Ali Shire.

30 Ee ubaxcaddaydii hartiga, oofta kaga joojay
31 Nimankii iniinaha ka dhigay, Ilig wixii joogay
32 Ee Eerago iyo Batalo, igu uquumeeyey
33 Ee omoska Beerdhiga tukaha, igu ormaysiiyey
34 Nimankii ayaantii Gumburo, oboda ii dhiibay
35 Ardaashii Jidbaalle i heshee, igu unuun goysay

Translation:

30 those who have unlawfully and unjustifiably executed numerous Ubahadde (Ubaxcadday) people of the Harti
31 those who annihilated every last soul who was at the Illig wells
32 those who turned me into a displaced person at nonecumene localities like Erigo and Batalo
33 who at the plains of Beerdhiga, turned my followers (Darawiish) into minced meat for the maneating bird of prey to feast upon
34 those who at the battle of Gumburka Cagaare, gladly became informants (for the colonizers)
35 who at the decisive battle of Jidbaali, decapitated us (the Darawiish)

=== Women and children ===
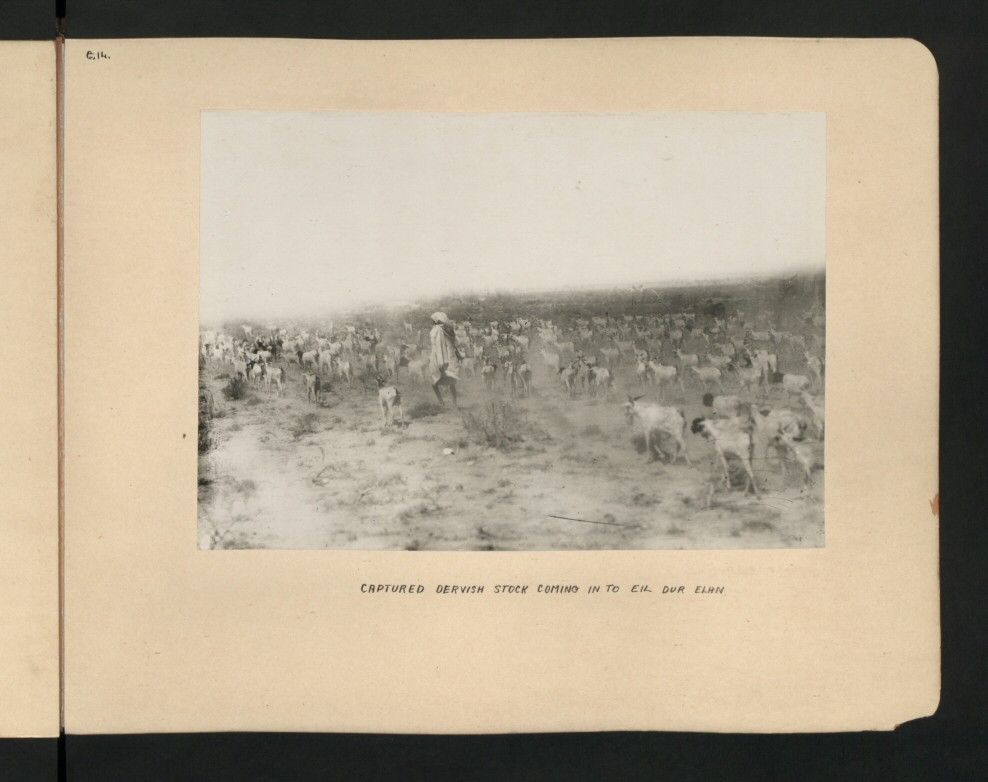
Captured stock of Darawiish women coming in to Eil Dur Elan documented in UK National Archives corroborates the Sayid's accusation of war crimes against non-combatant Darawiish women in Afbakayle verse 37

Verse 37 states that the colonial forces robbed not only the camels of Darawiish men but also the goats belonging to women. Traditionally, the act of men robbing women was seen as cowardly and taboo. Here, the Sayid insinuates that colonial forces serving under Charles Egerton and Eric John Eagles Swayne were depraved suggesting that taking goats from women indicates they were degenerates who lacked a moral compass. It also seeks to establish a paradigm for masculinity and that women and children can be the main victims of war:

36 Nimankii uluuf iyo uluuf, igu agoomeeyey
37 Nimankii adduunkeygii dhacay, ariyo geeliiba
38 Anigoo islaamaba kuwii, ii arxami waayay
39 Nimankaan Ilaahoow lahaa, eyda iga doono
40 Abaalkayga nimankii ba’shee, ii istixayn waayey
41 Ahabtiyo ergeyntii kuwii, lagala ayn waayey

Translation:

36 those who are the reason why there's a long stream of parentless orphans aimlessly wandering about
37 those who robbed our world and took not only the men's camels, but even robbed the (Darawiish) women's goats!
38 those who showed no empathy whatsoever despite supposedly being a co-religionist to myself
39 those dogs against whom I prayed "may abominations and imprecations reach you"!
40 those ungrateful ones, despite my favors and placations
41 those whom routinely rejected my offers of diplomacy and peace-overtures

=== Ijaaba (etiquette) ===
These following verses speak about customs and ijaaba (etiquette), as well as violations of war norms of the British colonial army vis-a-vis the laws of war:

42 Nimankii ijaabada ka tagay, aakhiru sabanka
43 Nimankii iblays nagu diray, naga ajoon waayey
44 Nimankii arlada Eebbahay, naga ugaareeyey
45 Nimankii awaaraha buska leh, nagu eryoonaayay
46 Ninkii abaartii caleed, Bari na aadsiiyay
47 Argalkiyo rasaastii kuwii, nagu igbaaraayay

Translation:

42 those who are without ijaaba (etiquette), like its doomsday
43 those who won't even flinch at the notion of making provisions for the devil
44 those who made us stateless on the land of our God-given birthright
45 those who implore us towards the most obnoxious ideas imaginable, as if mounting the back of the devil's horse
46 those who drive us from the fertile lands towards arid lands of the east
47 those colonial lackeys who are discernible by when they loudly rejoice, whenever a bullet of theirs strikes us (Darawiish)

=== Indignation ===
The following verses are about the fury, ire, and wrath felt by the Sayid in the immediate aftermath of the Jidbali battle of 1904:

48 Ee urugadaan qabiyo ciil, igu abaadsiiyey
49 Nimankii ilmada iga qubee, oohin iga keenay
50 Nimankaan ku alaladay markii, uunku wada jiifay
51 Nimankii ujuurada cunee, iibkii ii bixiyey
52 Nimankii intaas nagu falaan, na asaraareynin

Translation:

48 the level of resentment and sourness which I feel in my soul, one could only imagine
49 those who made me gush streams of tears, whereby I'm weeping (as if feminine)
50 those howling and ululating for joy, upon discovering the unburied mass graves of naysayers to colonisation
51 those partakers in loan-sharking, who made us part of their transaction
52 those who've done all this and not once have they warranted or validated their actions

=== Two-facedness ===
In 1904, the House of Commons of the United Kingdom proposed paying the Sayid an annual sum of money in exchange for stopping hostilities against the British.

I made a suggestion at least ten years ago that this gentleman (sal. the Mullah) ought to be offered, say £2,000 per year, and then he would keep quiet. I do not really know that he has been doing any harm when let alone. I am perfectly certain that for a modest sum he would become entirely friendly to the British Government. And observe the saving it would be supposing you paid this gentleman, as is the custom of the Government in India to pay along the frontier subsidies to tribes as long as they kept quiet, whereas you have spent £4,000,000 and many lives in chasing him, and for what purpose I never could find out.

— John Dillon, British MP

In response, the British Secretary of State said the following:

His Majesty's Government have also raised the question whether it would be possible to adopt towards the Mullah the policy which has been followed by the Indian Government in dealing with some of the tribes of the North-western frontier, and to come to some arrangement with him by which he would undertake to refrain from raids on British territory in return for the payment of an annual subsidy.

— Alfred Lyttelton, Secretary of State

The conclusion of the Afbakayle poem considers these offers of rapprochement as two-faced and duplicitous in light of previous hostilities:

53 Waxba yey addoomaha Ilaah, nooga aargudine
54 Waxba yaan adduun layga siin, ilintidaydiiyee
55 Utuntayda waa heli haddaan, iilka lay dhigine
56 Araraha intaan marahayey, igu arkaayaane
57 Maruun baan sidii aar libaax, oodda soo jebinne
58 Ashtakooda’aa iyo warqado, ku andacoodaaba
59 Mar haddaan shareecadu aqoon, nimanka liddoora
60 Ashahaadadoodiyo ma rabo, ina wallayntooda
61 Mar haddaan wadaad aayad diin, ila ekeyneynin
62 Amaan aniga la i oran karayn, tanu ahaan mayso
63 Allow yaa af lama daaliyee, iga asluubaysta

Translation:

53 after all that, why should I now trust your offers of restitution?
54 after all that, why should I now accept your offers of paying our due blood money?
55 rather, I shall lay my vengeance upon them! As long as my deathbed does not take me!
56 they assume that me being a displaced person in exile means I'm enfeebled or incapacitated
57 but rather, at some point I will disintegrate them all, like the coming of a he-lion
58 someway, I will achieve my objective, even if I have to resort to canvassing papers or filing petitions
59 since the iidoor are clueless when it comes to the sharia
60 I'm uninterested in their testimony of faith when they're cherrypickers with regards to the legal system
61 we've already established there's no clergyman here on the same rank as myself
62 we've established that no one here could ameliorate upon an injunction I've put forth
63 as such, lets not waste our breath in needless conjecture
