= Mohammed Abdullah (Sayyid) =

Somali anti-colonial leader (1856–1920)

Sayyid Sayyid Abdullah Hassan Maxamed Cabdulle Xasan امحمد بن عبد الله حسن
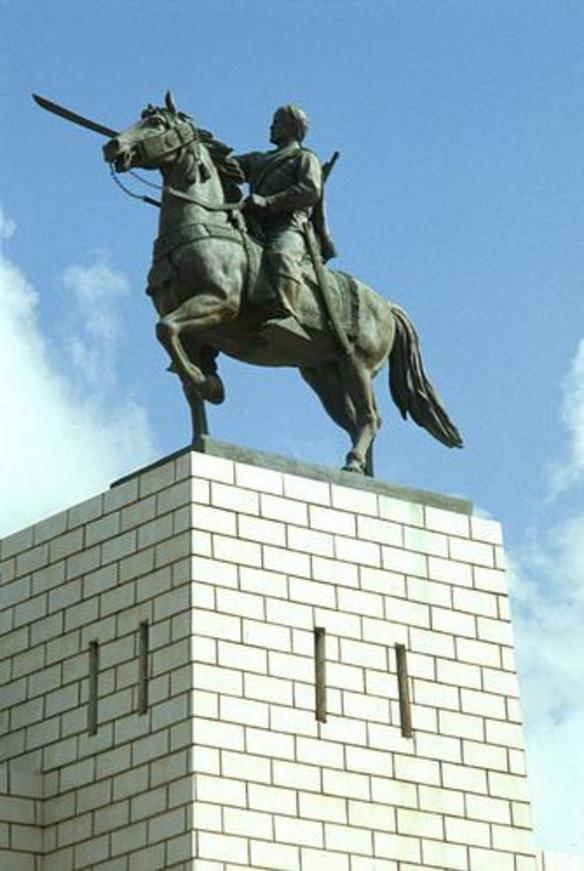
- Statue of Muhammad Abdullah Hassan in Mogadishu

Emir (Sayid)
- In office 21 April 1896 – 21 December 1920
- Deputy: Ismail Mire
- Preceded by: Position established
- Succeeded by: Position destablished

Personal details
- Born: Muḥammad Ibn Abdallāh Ibn Hassan; 7 April 1856 Buuhoodle, Ciid
- Died: 21 December 1920 (aged 64) Imi, Ogaden
- Cause of death: Influenza
- Spouse: Hasna Doreh
- Occupation: Politician; theologian; poet; scholar; military leader
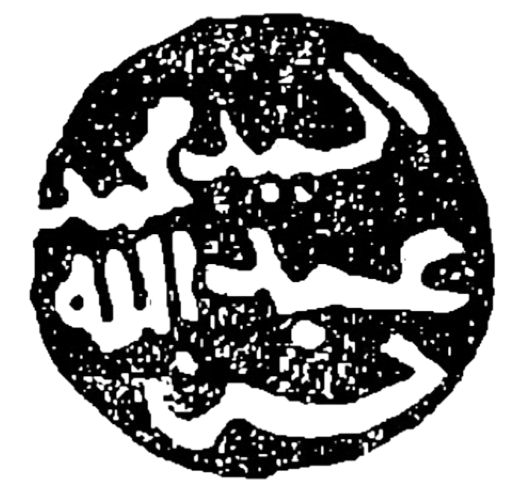
- Signature

Military service
- Allegiance: Dervish State
- Battles/wars: Dervish War; Battle of Jigjiga; Battle of Erego; Battle of Agaarweyne; Battle of Dul Madoba; Battle of Hiraan
- Title: Emir / "Sayyid"

Religious life
- Religion: Islam
- Denomination: Sunni
- Jurisprudence: Shafi'i
- Tariqa: Salihiyya

Sayyid Moḥammad Abdallah Hassan (Somali: Maxamed Cabdulle Xasan; Arabic: امحمد بن عبد الله حسن; 7 April 1856 – 21 December 1920) was a Somali scholar, poet, military leader and religious, cultural and political figure who founded and headed the Taleh-based Dervish movement, which led a holy war against British, Italian and Ethiopian colonial intrusions in the Somali Peninsula. He was pejoratively known by the British Empire as the Mad Mullah. In 1917, the Ottoman Empire referred to him as the "Emir of the Somali People". Due to his successful completion of the Hajj to Mecca, his assertion of being the descendant of the Islamic prophet Muhammad and his complete memorization of the Quran, his name is preluded with honorifics such as Hajji, Hafiz, Emir, Sheikh, Mullah or Sayyid. His influence led him to being regarded as among the "Father of Somali nationalism".

== Early life ==
Mohammed Abdullah Hassan was born in 1856 in the Sacmadeeqa (Sa'Madeeq) valley in the Ciid region. His family was religious and pastoral, tracing origins from the Ogaden clan on his father's side and Dhulbahante clan on his mother's side. He was raised among Dhulbahante pastors, tending livestock and occasionally visiting the port city of Berbera with relatives. By the age of eleven, Hassan had already memorised the entire Qur'an, showing remarkable promise as a scholar and leader. He later attended Islamic learning centers across Harar, Mogadishu, and Sudan, and was taught by over seventy teachers.

In the early 1890s, he completed the Hajj to Mecca, where he was deeply influenced by ʿAbd al‑Salām al‑Sālih, the founder of the Salihiyya order centered around doctrinally strict and reformist ideas. The order shaped his militant and reformist religious outlook, emphasising jihad against foreign influence and a revival of strict Islamic practices. Upon his return to Somalia in 1895, Hassan settled in Berbera, where he built a mosque and began preaching against the British colonial presence and Christian missionary activities, which he believed threatened Islam. He was particularly incensed by conversion of Somali children to Christianity and colonial demands for entry permits, which he saw as affronts to Somali autonomy.

In Berbera, the established tariqa of Qadiriyya was soon challenged by the Salihiyya order, criticizing the Qadiriyya for tolerating practices they deemed were un-Islamic, such as the consumption of khat (a stimulant plant) and chewing tobacco. In 1897, Ḥassan engaged in theological debates with Qadiriyya sheikhs in Berbera, including Aw Gaas, Xaaji Ibrahim Xirsi, and later Sheikh Madar, the leader of the Somali Qadiriyya. These debates focused on religious practices and interpretations, with Ḥassan advocating for the Salihiyya's stance against what he saw as the Qadiriyya's laxity. The Qadiriyya sheikhs reportedly emerged victorious in these debates, reinforcing their dominance and tarnishing Ḥassan's reputation in the eyes of local religious establishments. Both sides accused each other of heresy, deepening the rift between the two orders.

In the aftermath of the 1897 debates, Hassan was banished from Berbera by the British authorities, who were wary of unrest. He re-joined his Dhulbahante kinsmen, and two years later, in 1899, he founded the Dervish movement, based on Salihiyya principles, partly as a rebuke to the Qadiriyya's status quo in relation to colonists. His confrontation with the Qadiriyya in Berbera thus laid the groundwork for his broader anti-colonial and religious campaign.

Hassan's fierce opposition to British, Italian, and Ethiopian colonial presence was a powerful recruitment tool. He framed his jihad as a defense of Somali sovereignty and Islam against foreign Christian encroachment, appealing to clans frustrated by colonial taxes, land seizures, and missionary activities. He declared jihad and denounced British influence, galvanized support from clans like the Ogaden and some sections of the Isaaq, who had felt marginalized by colonial policies. The Dervish became a direct challenge to the Qadiriyya order’s influence, as Hassan rallied followers, particularly from the Habar Tol Jaalo and eastern Habar Yoonis clans to his cause.

== The Dervish War ==
According to the consul-general James Hayes Sadler, the news that sparked the Dervish rebellion and the 21-year disturbance was either spread or concocted by Sultan Nur of the Habr Yunis. The incident in question was that of a group of Somali children that were converted to Christianity and adopted by the French Catholic Mission at Berbera in 1899. Whether Sultan Nur experienced the incident first hand or whether he was told of it is not clear; regardless, he spread news of the incident in the Tariqa at Kob Fardod in June 1899. In one of his letters to Sultan Deria in 1899, Sayyid Hassan said that the British "have destroyed our religion and made our children their children", alluding to Sultan Nur's incident with the Roman French Mission at Berbera. The Dervishes soon emerged as an opposition of the Christian activities, defending their version of Islam against the Christian mission.

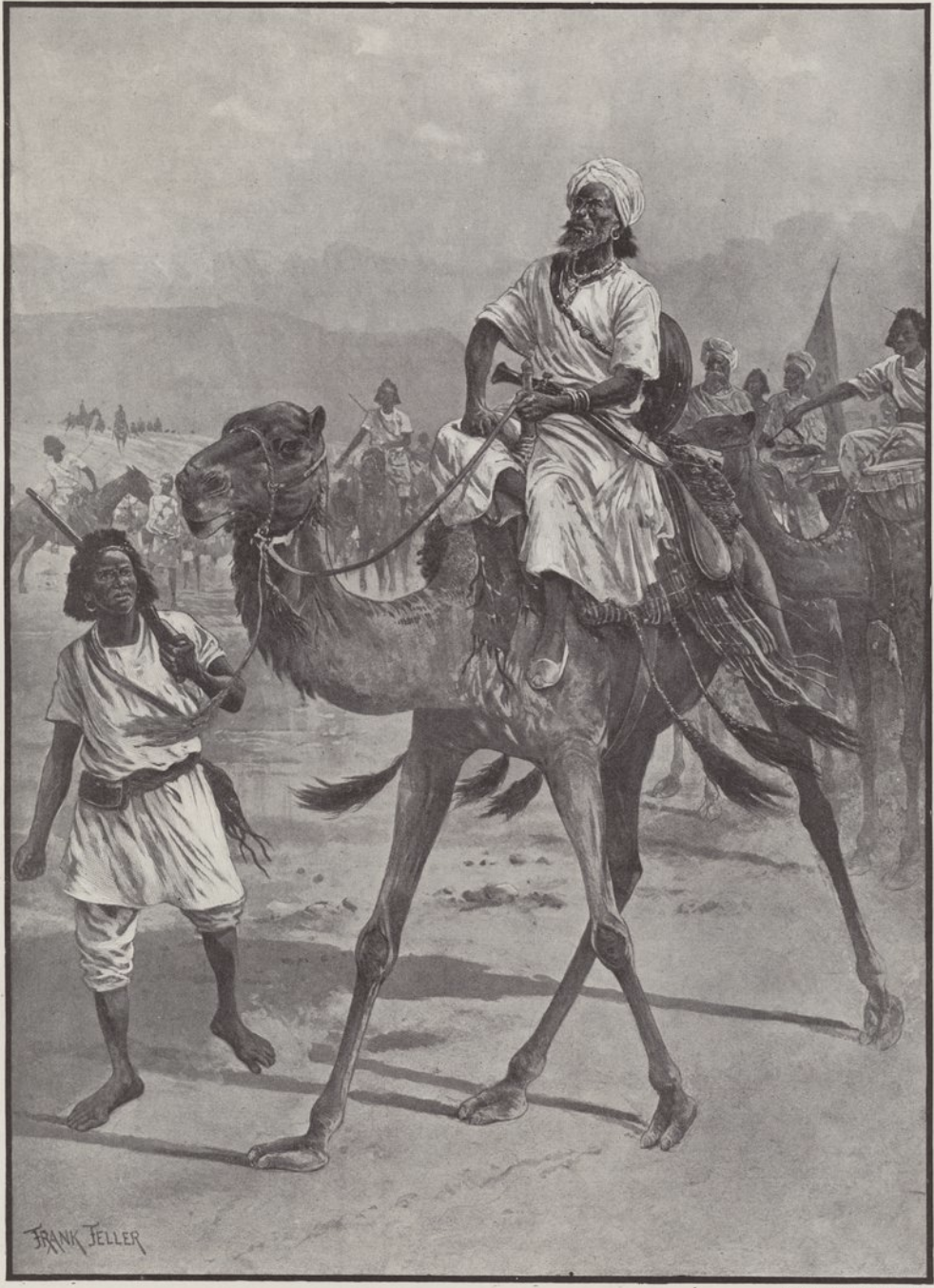
Muḥammad Ibn Abdallāh Ibn Hassan riding a camel alongside his Dervish followers

=== Risala lil-Bimal: Letter to the Bimal ===
There are only one people during the Dervish struggle the Sayyid extensively asked in a letter to join his struggle – the Bimal clan. The letter is still preserved to this day.

His letter to the Bimal was documented as the most extended exposition of his mind as a Muslim thinker and religious figure. It is said that the Bimal thanks to their size being numerically powerful, traditionally and religiously devoted fierce warriors and having possession of much resources have intrigued Mahamed Abdulle Hassan. But not only that the Bimal themselves mounted an extensive and major resistance against the Italians, especially in the first decade of the 19th century. The Italians carried many expeditions against the powerful Bimal to try and pacify them. Because of this the Bimal had all the reason to join the Dervish struggle and by doing so to win their support over. The Sayyid wrote a detailed theological statement to put forward to the Bimal tribe who dominated the strategic Banaadir port of Merca and its surroundings.

One of the Italian's greatest fears was the spread of "Dervishism" (which had come to mean "revolt") in the south and the strong Bimaal tribe of Benadir whom already were at war with the Italians, while not following the religious message or adhering to the views of Muhammad Abdullah Hassan, understood greatly his goal and political tactics. The dervishes in this case were engaged in supplying arms to the Bimaal. The Italians wanted to bring in an end to the Bimaal revolt and at all cost prevent a Bimal-Dervish alliance, which lead them to use the forces of Obbia and the Majerteen as prevention.

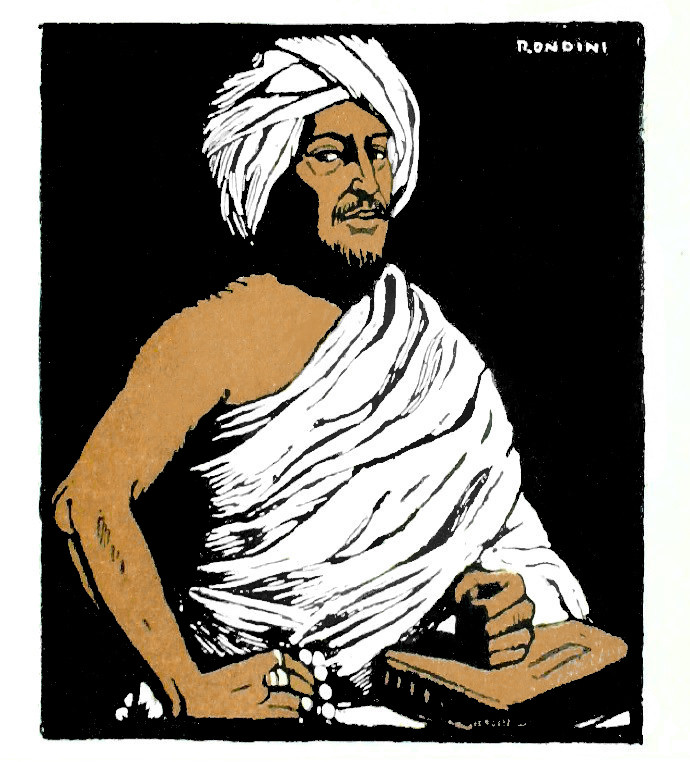
Illustration of Mohamed Abdullah Hassan by da Rondini, from cover of Il Mullah del paese dei somali by Douglas Jardine

=== Ethiopia, Britain and Italy ===
However, soon angered by his autocratic rule, Hussen Hirsi Dala Iljech' – a Mohammed Subeer chieftain – plotted to kill him. The news of the plot leaked to Hassan. He escaped, but his maternal uncle, Aw 'Abbas, was killed. Some weeks later, Mohammed Subeer sent a peace delegation of 32 men to Hassan, but Hassan had all the members of the delegation arrested and killed. Shocked by the actions of Hassan, Mohammed Subeer sought the help of the Ethiopians and the Dervish withdrew to Nugaal.

Towards the end of 1900, Ethiopian Emperor Menelik proposed a joint action with the British against the Dervish. Accordingly, British Lt. Col. Eric John Eagles Swayne assembled a force of 1,500 Somali soldiers led by 21 European officers and started from Burco on 22 May 1901, while an Ethiopian army of 15,000 soldiers started from Harar to join the British forces intent on crushing the 20,000 Dervish fighters (of whom 40 percent were cavalry).

On 9 January 1904, at the Jidaale (Jidballi) plain, the British commander, General Charles Egerton, killed 1,000 Dervish. This defeat forced Sayyid and his remaining men to flee to Majeerteen country.

Around 1909, in a secret meeting under a big tree later nicknamed "Anjeel tale waa" ("The Tree of Bad Counsel"), about 400 Dervish followers decided to stop following the mullah upon receiving the expulsion letter from the head of the Tariqa, Sheikh Salah, excommunicating the mullah. Their departure weakened, demoralized and angered Sayyid, and it was at this juncture that he composed his poem entitled "The Tree of Bad Counsel".

=== Fight against the Qadiriyya ===
Despite leaving Berbera after being rebuked by the leading Sheikhs of the rival Qadiriyya school, the enmity did not end. Heated poems would be exchanged between the Sayyid and prominent Sheikh Uways al-Barawi from Barawa, the leader of the 1908 Benadir revolt.

Uways recited this qasida criticizing the Sayyid:

صل على محمد واله واصرف بهم من كل سوء داهيه
من اقتدى محمدا بشرعه لا يقتدى جماعة الشيطانية
هم المبيحون دماء العلما والمال والحريم هم إباحيه
ويمنعون الدرس للعلوم كالفقه والنحو هم الكراميه
بكل شيخ مات كالجيلاني لا يتوسلون كالجناحيه
لا يقتدرون خلف من له شعر سيماهم التحليق كالوهابيه
ويشترون الجنة بمال في دارنا جهرا هم الكلابيه
ويختلون بالحريم للإجا زة كأمهم فذا سفاحيه
يتبعون رأيهم لا كتبنا ويدعون النور من بلاسيه
ويفعلون النكر في ذكرهم فعلا وقولا يقتضي كفرانيه
كاللعب قائلين أألله شكا به جلهم الشماليه
لهم ضجيج وأنين وحنيــــــــن وفحيح كالكلاب الناحيه
ويكثرون الحلف بالطلاق وينكرون الكلفة الالهيه
ضلوا وأضلوا العباد في الثرى برا وبحرا اي من السماليه
أليس ذو لب وفهم يغترر بهم ففر عنهم كالدواهيه

— Uways Al Barawi Qasida on Salihiyya
Translation:

Give a prayer to Muhammad (Sayyid) and his family and turn, through them, from all evil calamities
The ones who has imitated Muhammad (Prophet Muhammad) through his law does not follow the faction of Satan
They are the justifiers of [spilling] the blood of the ulama and of wealth and women, they are libertines
They prohibit the study of sciences such as law and grammar, they are the repugnant

Through every Shaykh who has died such as Al-Jilani they do not seek petition, like the faction of sin
They do not follow behind the one who has locks of hair, their characteristic is to wear their hair long like the Wahhabiyya
They trade paradise for cash publicly, in our land, they are a sect of dogs
They dally with women who come for license, like with their own mothers, and this is fornication

They follow their own opinions, not our books, and they claim to the light from the faction of Satan
And they practice denial at their dhikr, in word and action it requires blasphemy
Like their game of saying Is it God? - doubting him, the northern faction (dervishes) glorify them
They make a clamour, a wailing and groaning and howling like mournful dogs

And they frequently use the oath By the divorce and reject the ceremony of Allah
They have gone astray and make people go astray on earth by land and sea anyone from [among] the Somalis
Is it not the owner of reason and understanding deceived by them?
Then flee from them as from calamities

With a long response the Sayyid ended with these sharp words:

A word from the backsliding apostates (Qadiriyya)
Who have gone astray from the Prophet's way, the straight path
Why is the truth so plain, hidden from you?

This exchange would lead to takfir, or accusations of apostasy, from both men, and the murder of Uways by the Dervish in 1909. This ironically proved Sheikh Uways' accusation that the Sayyid deemed it lawful to spill the blood of the learned. The Sayyid would mock Sheikh Uways' death with a final poem: "Behold, at last, when we slew the old wizard, the rains began to come!".

=== Consolidation ===
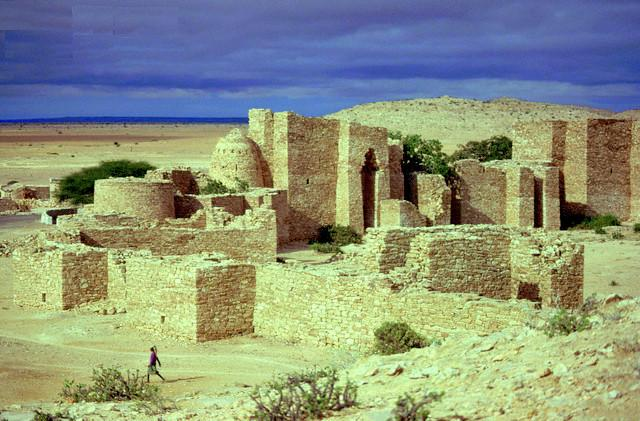
The Dervish fort / Dhulbahante garesa in Taleex

During 1909–1910, the Dervish capital moved from Illig to Taleh in the heart of Nugal, where the Dervish built three garrison forts of massive stone work and a number of houses. Hassan built a luxurious palace for himself and kept new guards drawn from outcast clans. By 1913, the Dervish dominated the entire hinterland of the Somali peninsula building forts at Jildali and Mirashi, and at Werder in the Ogaden and Beledweyne in southern Somalia. On 9 August 1913, at the Battle of Dul Madoba, a Dervish force raided the Dolbahanta clan and killed or wounded 57 members of the 110-man Somaliland Camel Constabulary. The dead included the British officer who commanded the constabulary, Colonel Richard Corfield. Hassan memorialized this action in his poem entitled "The Death of Richard Corfield". In the same year, fourteen Dervishes infiltrated Berbera and fired few shots on its citizens fleeing, causing panic. In 1914, the Somaliland Camel Corps was founded as an expanded and improved version of the constabulary.

A British force was gathering against the Dervishes when they were interrupted by the outbreak of World War I. Among the British officers deployed was Adrian Carton de Wiart (later Lieutenant General), who lost an eye during the campaign, and Hastings Ismay, a staff officer who was later Winston Churchill's chief military adviser.

=== Defeat ===
In the beginning of 1920, the British struck the Dervish settlements with a well-coordinated air and land attack and inflicted a stunning defeat. The forts of the Dervishes were damaged and the army suffered great losses. The Dervish retreated in to the Ogaden territory in Abyssinia and raided the Ogaden Bah Hawadle clan who were under Habr Yunis protection, reacting to this incident, Haji Warabe of the Reer Caynaashe assembled an army composed of 3,000 warriors. The army set out from Togdheer; on the dawn of July 20, 1920, they reached Shineleh where the Dervish were camped and proceeded to attack them. The Dervish, numbering about 800, were quickly defeated, 700 being killed in the battle; the few remaining survivors fled south. Haji and his army captured 60,000 camels and 700 rifles from the defeated Dervish. During the midst of the battle, Haji Warabe entered Hassan's tent, finding it empty with Hassan's tea still hot. The Mullah, now a fugitive, continued to flee westwards into the wastelands of the Ogaden.

In October 1920, he eventually settled down at Guano Imi, at the head waters of the Shebelle River in the Arsi country, with a party of some four hundred followers. When Fitawrari Seyoum, commanding the nearest Abyssinian garrison at Ginir, heard of his arrival, he sent one of his officers, Garazmatch Ayale, to learn why he had entered Abyssinian territory. The Mullah received the officer well, and said that he had been beaten in battle by the British and had come to Abyssinia for protection. He then sent the Fitawrari four rifles and a revolver as presents and asked for some provisions in exchange. Fitawrari Seyoum reported the matter to Ras Tafari, who ordered him to not attack the Mullah but keep him under his watch. However, provisions were not provided and famine fell on the Mullah's camp, with most of his remaining followers dying of sickness and hunger; the few that survived were said to have dispersed shortly after.

== Death ==
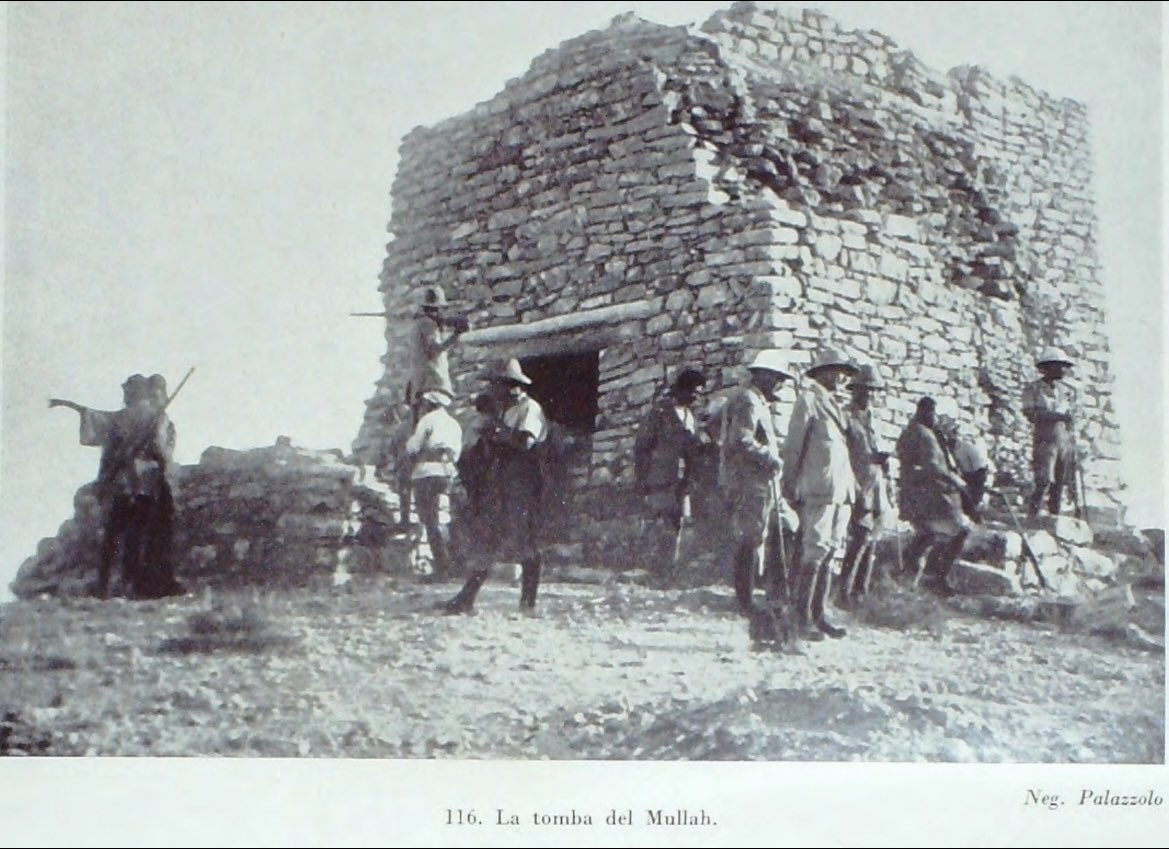
The Sayyid's tomb at Imi

Hassan died of influenza on 21 December 1920, at the age of 64. His grave is believed to be located somewhere close to Imi, a town in the Somali Region of Ethiopia; however, the exact spot is unknown. Somali historian Ahmed Farah Ali Idaajaa said that Hassan was buried in Imi, but was exhumed a few years later and taken to Jarjari. However, cultural experts from the Somali Autonomous Region added that the got information about 22 graves in Raydiito and Baali regions, identified as potential burial sites of Hassan. They planned to use test DNA to identify the skeleton of the Sayid. In mid 2009, the Somali Regional State administration announced that they would exhume his remains and rebury them in his old castle at Imi.

== Legacy ==
Hassan has been seen by some as an icon of Pan-Somalism, and has been considered one of the great revolutionaries of the turn of the 20th century by members of the Pan-Africanist movement.

A socialist realist statue of Hassan riding his horse Hiin-Faniin was built in central Mogadishu near the Mogadishu Central Mosque in the 1970s or 1980s, but the statue was torn down between 1991 and 1993 and sold as scrap metal. The damaged foundation of the monument was left standing. On 18 October 2019, the monument was restored and unveiled by Somali president Mohamed Abdullahi Mohamed, along with other restored monuments. A similar statue was built in the Ethiopian city of Jigjiga in 2013.

In the Khatumo region, there is a monument marking Hassan's birthplace, near Buuhoodle in a place called Sacmadeeqa.

=== In popular culture ===
- The documentary film The Parching Winds of Somalia includes a section on the Dervish struggle and its leader Mohammed Abdullah Hassan.
- The historic romance novel Ignorance is the Enemy of Love by Farah Mohamed Jama Awl has a Dervish protagonist called Calimaax, who is part of an ill-fated love story and fights against the British, Italians and Ethiopians in the Horn of Africa.
- A 1983, film entitled A Somali Dervish was directed by Abdulkadir Ahmed Said.
- In the Law & Order: Criminal Intent episode "Loyalty", references are made to the Dervishes and their leader. The episode also features a character purported to have been descended from Muhammad Abdullah Hassan.
- In 1985, a 4-hour and 40 minute Indian-produced epic film by filmmaker Salah Ahmed entitled the Somalia Dervishes went into production. With a budget of $1.8 million, it included a descendant of Hassan as its star, and featured hundreds of actors and extras.
- In the comic book series Corto Maltese, the protagonist travels to the Horn of Africa during the Dervishes' battle against the British, and witnesses the former power storm a British fort. During these travels, he develops a long-term friendship with a Dervish warrior named Cush, who subsequently features in several other of Corto's adventures around the world.

== Poems ==
Some poems by the Sayid include:

- "Haddaan waayey"
- "Maqashiiya uunka" is a religious and nationalist appeal
- "Afbakayle", which deals with treachery and etiquette
- "Mariyama Shiikh", which deals with clemency
- "Dardaaran", says there is a hidden malicious intent behind stipends paid by colonialists

== See also ==
- Haji Sudi – one of the founding members of the Dervish movement and the chief military commander
- Abdullahi Sadiq – governor of Ogaden
- Sultan Nur – Sultan of the Habr Yunis clan and one of the founding members of the Dervish movement and the Dervish Sultan
- Hasna Doreh – wife of Mohammed Abdullah Hassan
- Ismail Mire – soldier and a bard
- Sheikh Uways Al-Barawi – religious rival of the Sayyid and leader of the Benadir revolt
- Bashir Yussuf – Somali religious leader who fought against the British alongside Mohammed Abdullah Hassan
- Ahmad ibn Ibrihim al-Ghazi – Somali Imam and General of the Sultanate of Adal
- Sheikh Madar – leader of the Qadiriyya tariqa and scholarly opponent of the Salihiyya and Dervish
- John Gough – awarded a Victoria Cross for his actions as a column commander during the Third Somaliland Expedition against Hassan
- Alexander Stanhope Cobbe – awarded a Victoria Cross for his actions at Erego 1902
- Adrian Carton de Wiart – British army officer who lost an eye attacking a fort at Shimbiris in 1914

== Notes ==
=== Sources ===
- Abdullahi (Badiyow), Abdurahman (2015). The Islamic Movement in Somalia. Adonis & Abbey Publishers Ltd. ISBN 9781912234035.
- Irons, Roy (2020). Churchill and the Mad Mullah of Somaliland: Betrayal and Redemption 1899–1921. Pen and Sword Books. ISBN 978-1-4738-3155-1.
- Jardine, Douglas J. (1923). The Mad Mullah of Somaliland (PDF). Herbert Jenkins Ltd. OCLC 459570591.
- Samatar, Said S. (1992). In the Shadow of Conquest: Islam in Colonial Northeast Africa. The Red Sea Press. ISBN 978-0-932415-70-7.
