= Dervish State (Horn of Africa) =

Somali anti-colonial state (1895–1920)

Dervish State Dawladda Daraawiish (Somali)
- 1895–1920
- Alleged flag of the Dervish State(comes from a contemporary ilustration) A more accurate Dervish flag(from McNeil, Malcolm (1902)and from page 212 of Taariikhdii Daraawiishta iyo Sayid Maxamed Cabdulle Xasan)

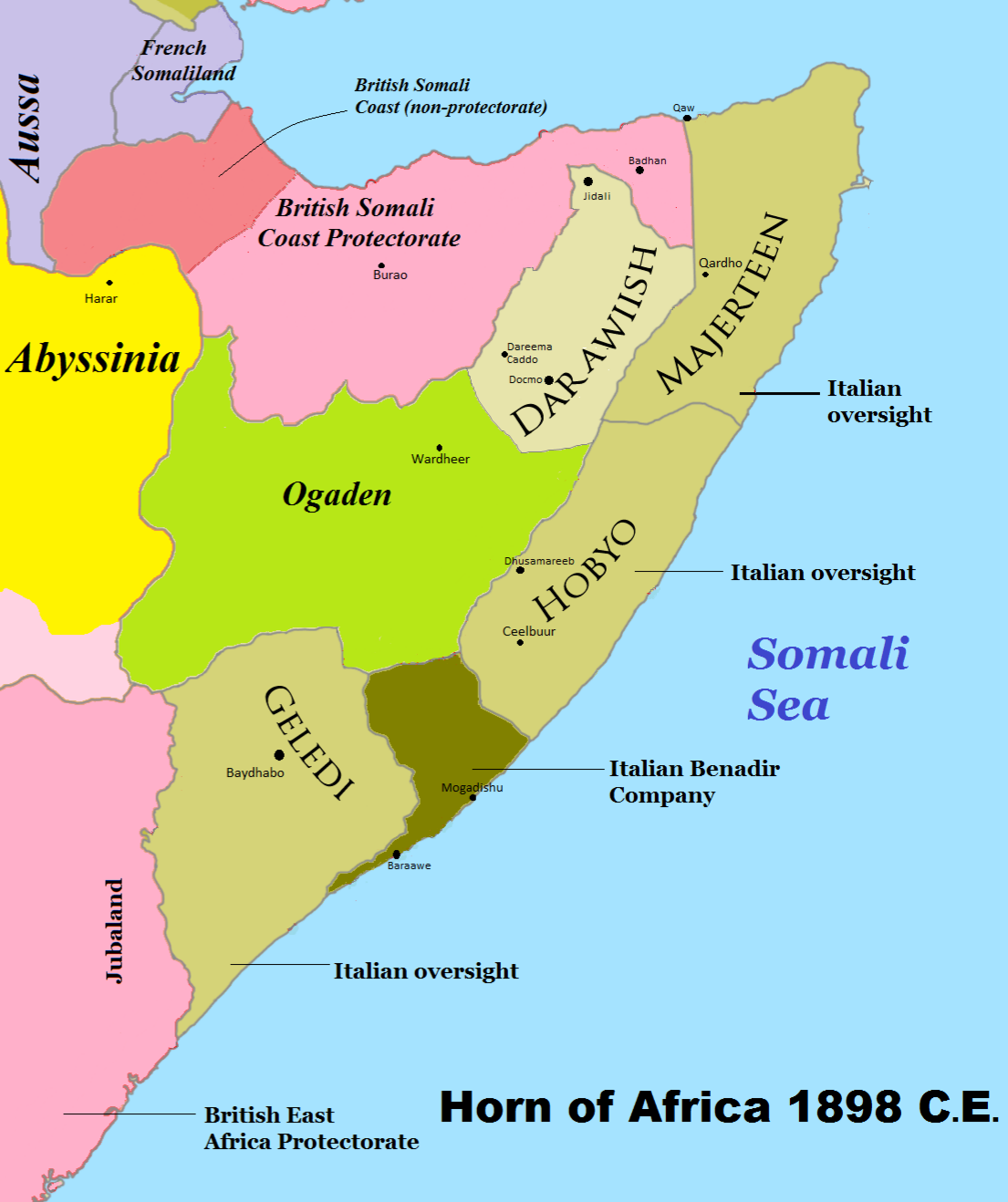
- Map of the Dervish in 1898, with the autonomous Huwan region shown in green.

- Dervish by 1915
- Capital: Taleh; Eyl
- Common languages: Somali
- Religion: Islam
- Demonyms: Darwiish/Dervish (citizens); Duubcad/Duub'ad (military)
- Government: Theocratic khusuusi
- Emir (Note: with honorific titless such as Hajji, Hafiz, Emir, Sheikh, Mullah or Sayyid.)
  - 1895–1920: Mohammed Abdullah
- Muqadim
  - 1895–1920: Ismail Mire
- Legislature: Haroun administration (Golaha Xarunta)
- History
  - Established: 1895
  - Battle of Jigjiga: 1900
  - Signing of Ilig Treaty, Nugaal Valley is ceded to the Dervish State: 1905
  - Battle of Dul Madoba: 1913
  - First World War (Support from the Ottoman Empire): 1914-1918
  - Decline of State: 1919
  - Disestablished: 9 February 1920

Area
  - Total: 50,000 sq mi (130,000 km^{2})
Preceded by	Succeeded by
Dhulbahante Garadate	Italian Somaliland; British Somaliland
- Today part of: Somalia; Ethiopia

The Dervish State (Somali: Dawladda Daraawiish) also known as the Dervish Movement, was an armed resistance movement and polity headquartered in Taleh, a city situated in the modern federated state of Waqooyi Bari, between 1895 and 1920. It was led by the Salihiyya Sufi Muslim poet and militant leader Mohammed Abdullah Hassan, also known as Sayyid Mohamed, who called for independence from the British and Italian colonisers and for the defeat of Ethiopian forces. The Dervish movement aimed to remove the British and Italian influence from the region and restore an "Islamic system of governance with a Sufi doctrine as its foundation", according to Mohamed-Rahis Hasan and Salada Robleh.

Hassan established a ruling council called the Khususi consisting of Sufi tribal elders and spokesmen, added an adviser from the Ottoman Empire named Muhammad Ali, and thus created a multi-clan Islamic movement in what led to the eventual creation of the state of Somalia.

The Dervish movement attracted approximately 25,000 youth from different clans over 1899 and 1905, acquired firearms and then attacked the Ethiopian garrison at Jigjiga. The Dervishes were able to take the cattle seized from the local Somalis, giving them their first military victory. (Note: The term Dervish, states Abdullah A. Mohamoud citing Beachey, has origins in the Turkish dervi or Persian darvesh. It means "ardent fighters for Islam" with an austere lifestyle.) The Dervish movement then declared the colonial administration in British Somaliland as their enemy. To end the movement, the British sought out the competing Somali clans as coalition partners against the Dervish movement. The British provided these clans with firearms and supplies to fight against the Dervishes. Punitive attacks were launched against Dervish strongholds in 1904. The Dervish movement suffered losses in the field, regrouped into smaller units and resorted to guerrilla warfare. Hasan and his loyalist Dervishes moved into the Italian-controlled Somaliland in 1905 after Hasan signed the Illig treaty, under which the Dervishes were ceded the Nugaal Valley, which strengthened his movement, and Hasan subsequently received an Italian subsidy and autonomous protected status.

In 1908, the Dervishes again entered British Somaliland and began inflicting major losses to the British in the interior regions of the Horn of Africa. From 1908 onwards until the end of the World War I the British retreated to the few remaining coastal regions after suffering heavy losses in the interior to which the Dervish continued to operate independently and leaving the interior regions in the hands of the Dervishes. During 1905-1910, the Dervishes continued raids against the remaining British who were defeated in the battle of Dul Madooba.

The Dervish movement led by Sayyid Muhammed Abdullah Hassan, continued independently from about (24–26) years between 1896/1900–1921. The Dervish movement had successfully repulsed the British Empire four times and forced it to retreat to the coastal region. Because of these successful expeditions, the Dervish movement was recognized as an ally by the Ottoman and German empires during the First World War. The Turks referred to the Sayyid as the Emir of the Somali nation, and the Germans promised to officially recognise any territories the Dervishes were to acquire. After a quarter of a century of holding the British at bay and with the end of the First World War leading to the defeat of the Dervish allies the Ottoman and German empires following the end of World War I, the British turned their attention to the Dervishes. In 1920, the British launched a massive combined arms offensive on the Taleh forts, strongholds of the Dervish movement. The offensive caused significant casualties among the Dervishes, although the Dervish leader Mohammed Abdullah Hassan managed to escape. His death in 1921 due to either malaria or influenza ended the Dervish movement.

The Dervish movement temporarily created a mobile Somali "proto-state" in early 20th-century with fluid boundaries and fluctuating population. It was one of the bloodiest and longest militant movements in sub-Saharan Africa during the colonial era, one that overlapped with World War I. The battles between various sides over two decades killed nearly a third of Somaliland's population and ravaged the local economy. Scholars variously interpret the emergence and demise of the militant Dervish movement in Somalia. Some consider the "Sufi Islamic" ideology as the driver, others consider economic crisis to the nomadic lifestyle triggered by the occupation and "colonial predation" ideology as the trigger for the Dervish movement, while post-modernists state that both religion and nationalism created the Dervish movement.

== History ==
=== Origins ===
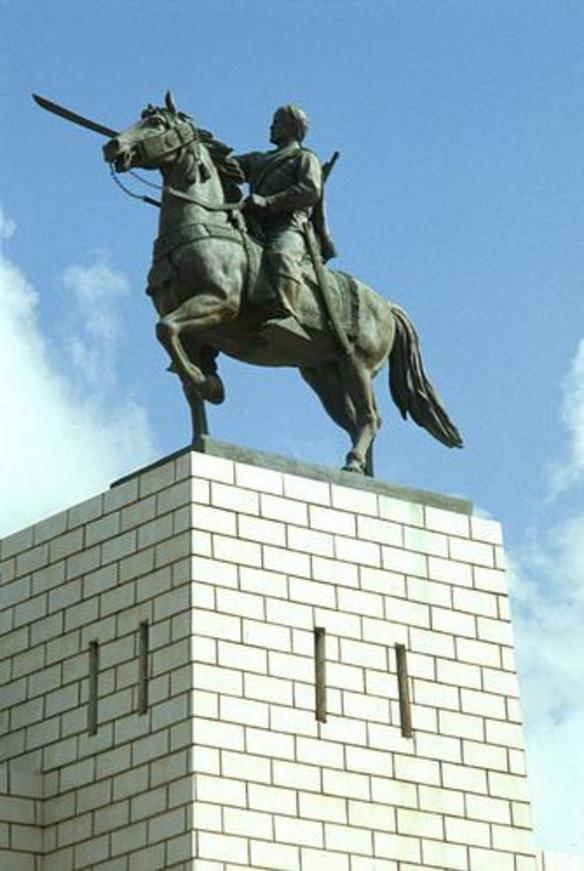
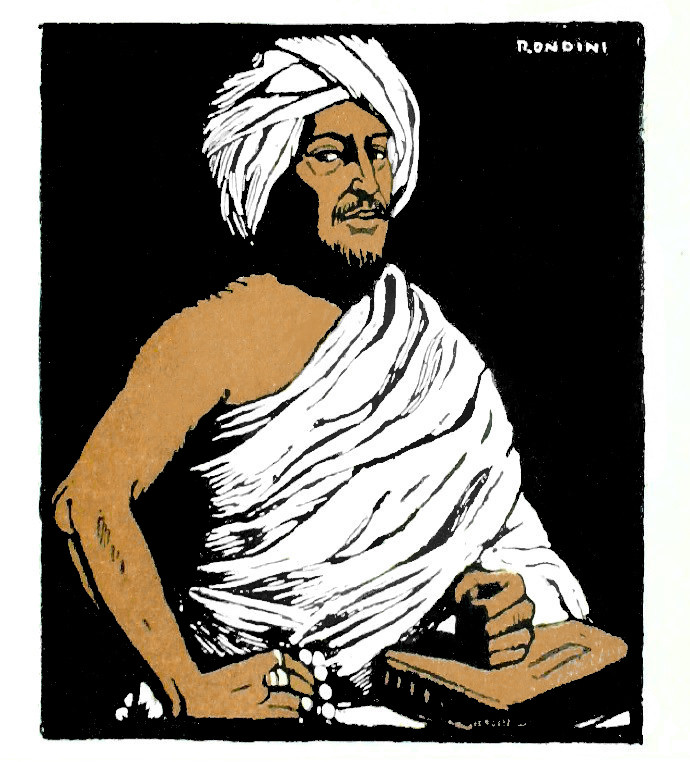
Mohammed Abdullah Hassan, leader of the Dervish movement.

According to Abdullah A. Mohamoud, traditional Somali society followed a decentralized structure and a nomadic lifestyle dependent on livestock and pastureland. It was also predominantly Muslim. By the close of the 19th century, the European colonial powers expanded their reach in the Horn of Africa, and the region of Somalia came under the influence of the British, the Ethiopians and the Italians. The withdrawal of the Egyptian troops from Harar enabled Ras Makonnen and Menelik II to expand the burgeoning Ethiopian realm eastward into the Ogaden territory. In 1884, Britain established a protective authority over Somaliland, aiming to safeguard Aden and the Bab-el-Mandeb strait's strategic interests in the Red Sea. By 1893, following arduous negotiations, an Italian chartered company assumed control over the Benadir coastline in southern Somalia, with the remainder of the region placed under an Italian protectorate in 1889. With foreign rule came the centralization of the economy, which greatly upset the traditional livestock and pastureland based livelihood of the Somalis. The foreign powers were also all Christians, which created additional suspicions amongst the Somali religious elite. The Ethiopian troops had already proved to be a bane for the Somalis as they were the traditional raiders and plunderers of their grazing herds. The arrival of the colonial powers and the consequent partitioning of Africa greatly affected the Somalis, with Sufi poets such as Faarax Nuur writing poems expressing his opposition to foreign rule. The Dervish movement can thus be seen as a reaction against the establishment of foreign control in Somalia.

The Dervish movement was led by a Sufi poet and religious nationalist leader named Mohammed Abdullah Hassan, also known as Sayid Maxamad Cabdulle Xasan. He was born in the Sacmadeeqo Lake, a location seven miles north of the town of Buuhoodle, sometime between 1856 and 1864 to a father who was a religious teacher. He studied in Somali Islamic seminaries and later went on Hajj to Mecca where he met Shaykh Muhammad Salah of the Salihiya Islamic Tariqah, which states The Encyclopedia Britannica was a "militant, reformist, and puritanical Sufi order". The preachings of Salah to Hasan had roots in Saudi Wahhabism, and it considered it a religious duty "to wage a holy war (jihad) against all other forms of Islam, the Western and Christian presence in the Muslim world, and a religious revival", state Richard Shultz and Andrea Dew. When Hasan returned to the Horn of Africa, the Somali tradition states that he saw Somali children being converted to Christianity by missionaries in the British colony. Hasan began preaching against this religious conversion and the British presence. He earned the ire of the British colonial administration, who pejoratively referred to him as "the mad mullah";his Sufi teachings were also opposed by the rival Qadiriya Tariqah – another traditional Sufi group of the region, states Said M. Mohamed. Another version of the early events link the illegal sale of a gun to Hasan by a corrupt Somali officer in 1899, who reported his gun as stolen rather than purchased by Hasan. The British authorities demanded the gun's return, while Hasan replied that the British should leave the country, a sentiment he had previously claimed in 1897 when he declared himself "the leader of a sovereign nation". Hasan continued to preach against the British introduction of Christianity to Somalia, stating that the "British infidels have destroyed our [Islamic] religion and made our children their children".

Hasan left the urban settlement and moved to preach in the countryside. His influence spread in the rural parts and many elders, as well as youth, became his followers. Hasan converted the influenced youth from different clans into a Muslim brotherhood, rallying to protect Islam from the influence of the Christian missionaries. These formed Hasan's armed resistance group set to confront the colonial powers, and came to be known as Dervishes or Daraawiish, states Said M. Mohamed.

=== Movement ===
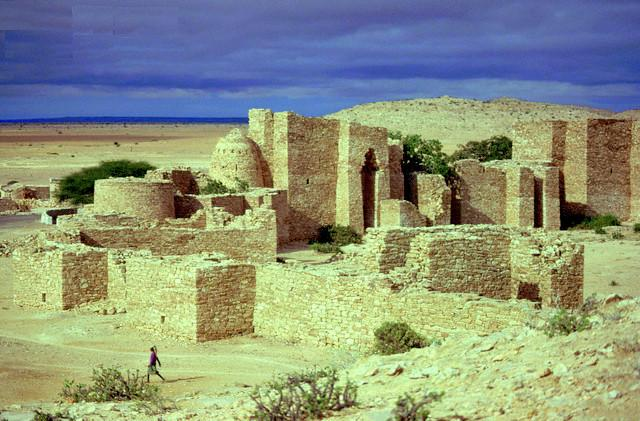
Taleh fortress, the Dervish capital.

The Dervish movement temporarily created a Somali "proto-state", according to Markus Hoehne. It was a mobile state with fluid boundaries and fluctuating population given the guerrilla style militant approach of Dervishes and their practice of retreating to sparsely inhabited hinterland whenever the colonial forces with superior firearms overwhelmed them. At the head of this state was the Sufi leader Hasan with the power of final decision. Hasan surrounded himself with a group of commanders for the militant operations supported by the khusuusi or the Dervish council. Islamic judges settled disputes and enforced the Islamic law in this Dervish state. According to Robert Hess, two of Hasan's chief advisors were Sultan Nur – previously Habr Yunis chief, and Haji Sudi Shabeel also known as Ahmad Warsama from Adan Madoba Habr Je'lo who was fluent in English.

Between 1900 and 1913, they operated from temporary local centers such as Aynabo in Somaliland and Illig in Puntland (then part of Italian Somaliland). Neville Lyttelton's War Office, and General Egerton described the Nugaal as the "base of operations" against Dervishes.

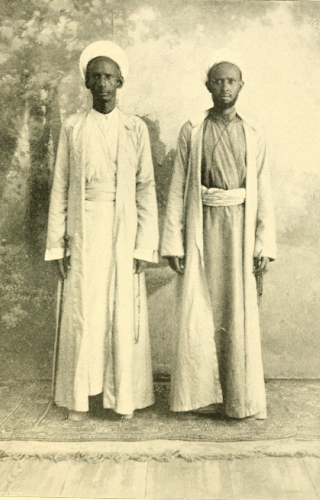
Dervish Khususi, Haji Sudi on the left with his brother in-law Duale Idres. Aden, 1892.

The Dervishes wore white turban and its army utilized horses for movement. They assassinated opposing clan leaders. Dervish soldiers used the dhaanto and geeraar traditional dance-song to raise their esprit de corps and sometimes sang it on horseback. Hasan commanded the Dervish movement soldiers in a martial manner, ensuring that they were religiously committed, powered up for warfare and men of character sworn with an oath of allegiance. To ensure unity among his troops, instead of letting them identify themselves by their different tribes, he made them identify themselves uniformly as Dervish. The movement obtained firearms from Sultan Boqor Osman Mahmud of Majerteen Sultanate, as well as the Ottoman Empire and Sudan. In addition, the Dervishes also obtained significant armaments' from the Adan Madoba section of the Habr Je'lo clan where, according to the contemporary source Official History of the Operations in Somaliland: "Of the former the Adan Madoba were not only responsible for supplying him Abdullah Hassan with arms, but also assisted him on all his raids."

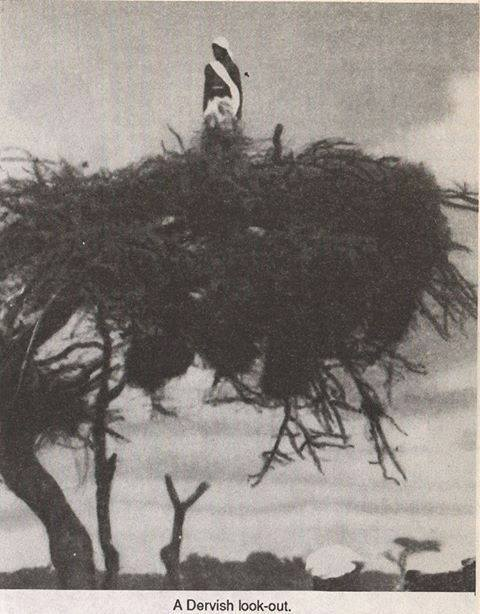
Dervish scout atop a tree

The Dervish fought many battles starting in 1899 against the Ethiopian troops. In 1904, the Dervishes were almost annihilated in Jidbaley. Hasan retreated into the Italian Somaliland and entered into a treaty with them, who accepted the control of Eyl port by the Dervishes. This port served as the Dervish headquarters between 1905 and 1909. During this period, Hasan rebuilt the Dervish movement army, the Dervishes raided and plundered their neighboring clans, and in 1909 assassinated their archrival Sufi leader Uways al-Barawi and burnt his settlement, according to Mohamed Mukhtar.

In 1913, after the British withdrawal to the coast, the Dervishes created a walled town with fourteen fortresses in Taleh by importing masons from Yemen. This served as their headquarters. The main fortress, Silsilat, included conical tower granaries that opened only at the top, wells with sulfurous water, cattle watering stations, a guard tower, walled garden, and tombs. It became the residence of Mohammed Abdullah Hassan, his wives and family. The Taleh structures also included the Hed Kaldig (literally, "place of blood"), where those whom Hasan disliked were executed with or without torture and their bodies left to the hyenas. According to Muktar, Hasan's execution orders also targeted dozens of his former friends and allies. The town of Taleh was mostly destroyed after a RAF aerial bombardment in early February 1920, though Hasan had already left his compound by then. In an April 1920 letter transcribed from the original Arabic script into Italian by the incumbent Governatori della Somalia, the British are described taking twenty-seven garesas or 27 houses from the Dhulbahante clan.

=== Relations with the Biimal ===
His letter to the Bimal was documented as the most extended exposition of his mind as a Muslim thinker and religious figure. The letter is until this day still preserved. It is said that the Bimal thanks to their size being numerically powerful, traditionally and religiously devoted fierce warriors and having possession of much resources have intrigued Mahamed Abdulle Hassan. But not only that the Bimal themselves mounted an extensive and major resistance against the Italians, especially in the first decade of the 19th century. The Italians carried many expeditions against the powerful Bimal to try and pacify them. Because of this the Bimal had all the reasons to join the Dervish struggle and by doing so to win their support over the Sayyid wrote a detailed theological statement to put forward to the Bimal tribe who dominated the strategic Banaadir port of Merca and its surroundings.

One of the Italian's greatest fears was the spread of 'Dervishism' (had come to mean revolt) in the south and the strong Bimaal tribe of Benadir whom already were at war with the Italians, whom in this case were engaged in supplying arms to the Bimaal. The Italians wanted to bring in an end to the Bimaal revolt and at all cost prevent a Bimal-Dervish alliance, which lead them to use the forces of Obbia as prevention.

In southern Somalia, there was another resistance, the Bimal or Banadir Resistance. This was a large resistance led by the Bimal clan spanning 3 decades of war. The Bimal being the main element, eventually neighboring adjacent tribes also joined the Bimal in their struggle against the Italians. The Italians feared that the Banadir Resistance would join hands with the Dervishes. During this period, is also when Dervish allies in Benadir had in 1909 assassinated their archrival Sufi leader Uways al-Barawi.

The Dervish movement aimed to remove the British and Italian influence from the region and restore the "Islamic system of government with Islamic education as its foundation", according to Mohamed-Rahis Hasan and Salada Robleh.

=== Engagements ===
In August 1899, the Dervish army occupied Burao, an important centre of British Somaliland, giving Muhammad Abdullah Hassan control over the city's watering places. Hassan also succeeded in making peace between the local clans and initiated a large assembly, where the population was urged to join the war against the British. His forces were supplied with the simple uniforms consisting of "a white cotton outer garment (worn by most Somali men of the time anyway), a white turban, a tasbih (or rosary), and a rifle".

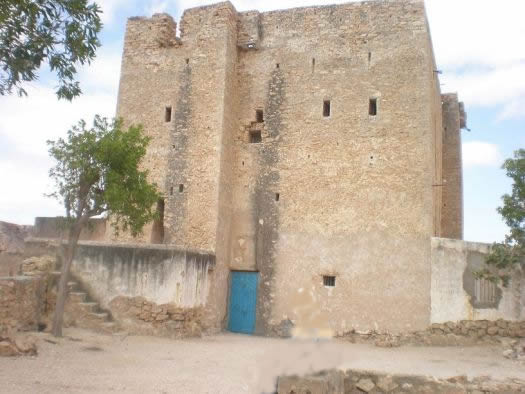
The historic Daarta Sayyidka Dervish fort in Eyl, Puntland.

In March 1900, Hassan along with his dervish forces attacked an Ethiopian outpost near Jijiga. Capt. Malcolm McNeill who commanded the Somali Field Force against Hassan reported that the Dervish were completely defeated, and that they have suffered a heavy loss amounting to 2,800 killed, according to the Ethiopians. Similar raids by the dervish would continue despite the losses across the Somali peninsula until 1920. McNeill notes that by June 1900, Hassan made his position even stronger than before his March 1900 defeat and had "practically dominated the whole of the southern portion of our Protectorate".

The British administration started to coordinate with the Italians and Ethiopians, and by 1901 a joint Anglo-Ethiopian force began to coordinate plans to eradicate the jihadists or limit their reach farther west to the Ogaden or borderland of northern Kenya. Lack of supplies and access to fresh drinking water in the large expanse of flat land made this a challenging feat for the British and their allies. In contrast, Hassan and his dervishes adapted harsh conditions of the land by eating carcasses of beasts and drinking water from the dead bellies of animals. Despite possessing superior weapons, including Maxim machine guns, until 1905, the Anglo-Ethiopian forces were still struggling to gain hold on the dervish movement.

Finally, the British Cabinet approved of air operations against the Dervish movement. It is said that the challenge of the Dervishes presented the British with a suitable environment to trial its new doctrine of warfare, which stressed "the use of aircraft as the primary arm, usually supplemented by ground forces, according to particular requirements".

In the Somaliland campaign of 1920, 12 Airco DH.9A aircraft were used to support the British forces. Within a month, the British had occupied the capital of the Dervish State and Hassan had retreated to the west.

== Jurisdiction ==
The area the Dervish State occupied covered 50,000 square miles.

In their own words, the Dervish State claimed to have had varied executive political offices. On the third of May 1899, the Dervish wrote a letter to James Hayes Sadler explaining that the existing leadership structure of their state consisted of a central government (the Haroun), the Sultan of the Dhulbahante, an emir (Muḥammad ibn 'Abdallāh Hassan himself), as well as chieftains.

The constituent clans of the Dervish during the formative years belonged to sections of the Ogaden and Dhulbahante. Habr Je'lo and Habr Yunis clans:

He acquired some notoriety by seditious preaching in Berbera in 1895, after which he returned to his tariga in Kob Faradod, in the Dolbahanta. Here he gradually acquired influence by stopping inter-tribal warfare, and eventually started a religious movement in which the Rer Ibrahim (Mukahil Ogaden), Ba Hawadle (Miyirwalal Ogaden) and the Ali Gheri (Dolbahanta) were the first to join. His emissaries also soon succeeded in winning over the Adan Madoba, notable among whom was Haji Sudi, his trusted lieutenant, and the Ahmed Farih and Rer Yusuf, all Habr Toljaala, and the Musa Ismail of the Eastern Habr Yunis, Habr Gerhajis, with Sultan Nur.

== Demise ==
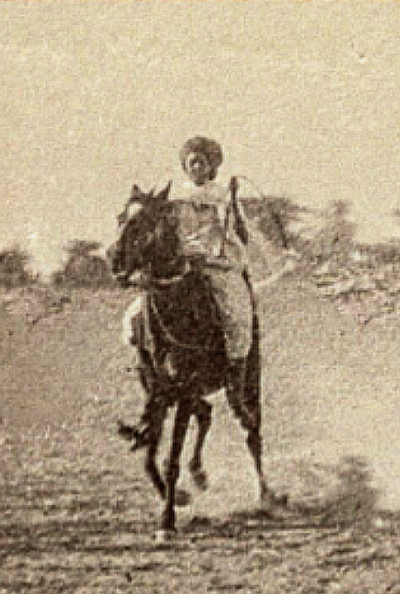
Tribal chief Akil Haji Mohamed Bullaleh, also known as Haji Warabe, who led the Hagoogane raid that put an end to the Dervish movement

=== Korahe raid ===
In the early 20th century during the Dervish wars, the British and Abyssinians came to an agreement that cross border camel raiding between the Somali tribes was to be banned and that the offending tribes would be punished by their respective governments. The Abyssinians only nominally having control over the Haud failed to meet their end of the agreement and this resulted in the Dervish and Ogaden alliance raiding with impunity while the Isaaq and Dhulbahante were unable to avenge the raids due to the British Camel Corps restraining them and returning looted Ogaden livestock. The secretary administrator of British Somaliland, Douglas James Jardine noted that the Isaaq sub clans inhabiting the Haud were in fact militarily superior and stronger than their Ogaden counterparts. After a series of Dervish-Ogaden raids, tribal elders held talks with the British Government, forcing the latter to lift the ban and let the clans deal with the Dervish-Ogaden themselves. The man chosen to lead the tribal forces was Akil (tribal chief) Haji Mohammad Bullaleh (also known as Haji Warabe) who himself had previous quarrels with the Mullah.

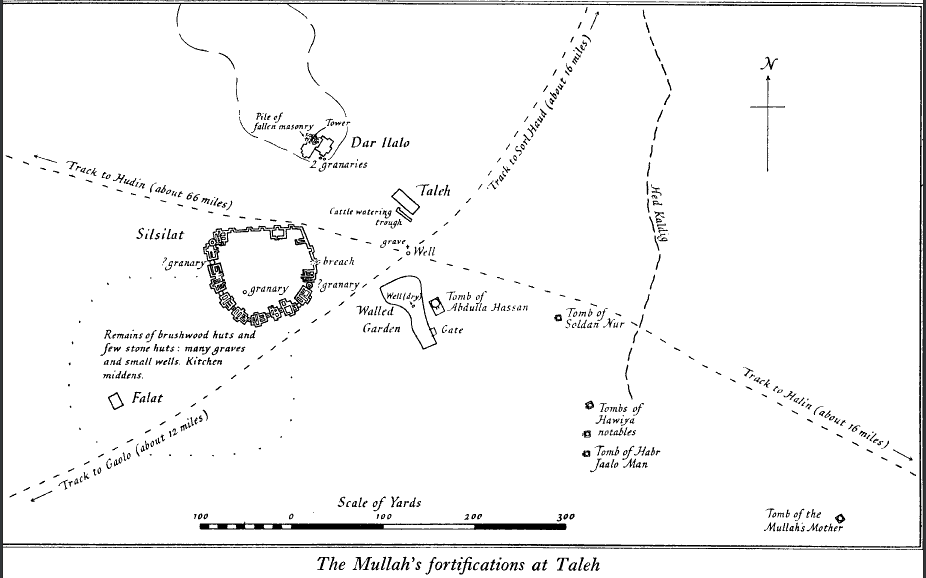
'The Mullah's fortifications at Taleh'. The tombs of Mohammed Abdullah Hassan, Sultan Nur and unnamed Habr Je'lo and Hawiye notabales can be seen in the plan

After the bombing campaign of the Taleh fort the Dervish retreated in to the Ogaden territory in Abyssinia and the Mullah was able to attract followers from his tribe. The catalyst for the Hagoogane raid happened on May 20, 1920, when a Dervish-Ogaden force raided the Ba Hawadle sub clan of the Ogaden who were under the protection of the Isaaq, killing women and children in the process.

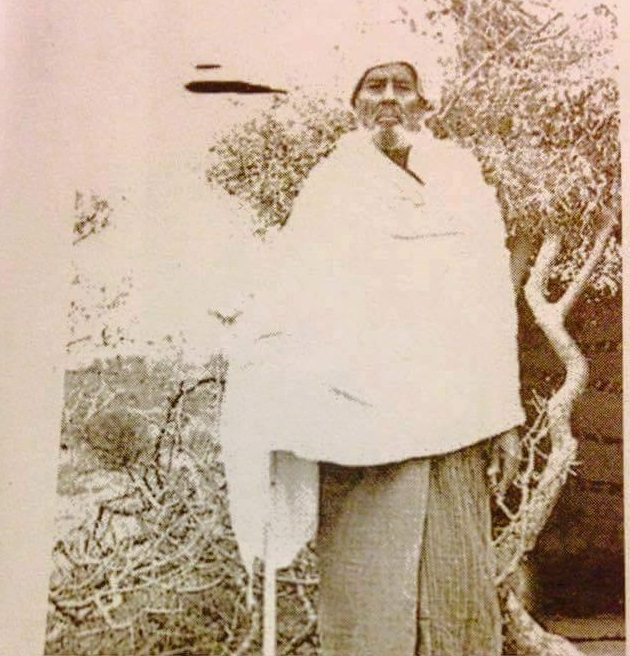
The last residents of the Silsilad fort were Haji Yusuf Barre, the singlehanded defender of Taleh, Mohamud Hosh (pictured), the last castellan of Taleh and Jama Biixi Kidin, an abandoned Dervish child prisoner.

Haji Warabe assembled an army composed of 3000 Habr Yunis, Habr Je'lo and Dhulbahante warriors. The army set out from Togdheer, on the dawn of July 20, 1920, Haji's army reached Korahe just west of Shineleh where the Dervish and their tribal allies were camped and commenced to attack with them with force. The Dervish-Ogaden numbering 800 were defeated swiftly and only a 100 survived the onslaught and fled south. Haji and his army looted 60,000 livestock and 700 rifles from their defeated foes. During the midst of the battle Haji Warabe entered the Mullah's tent to face his adversary but found the tent empty with the Mullah's tea still hot. The Mullah had fled to Imi where he would die due to influenza shortly afterwards. Haji Warabe's Habr Yunis and Habr Je'lo warriors divided the livestock and rifles amongst themselves denying the Dhulbahante soldiers their share as mentioned by Salaan Carrabey in his Guba poem addressed to Ali Dhuh. The looting dealt a severe blow to them economically, a blow from which they did not recover.

== Religion ==
The Dervishes had a local religious strand that of the religious teacher Kudquran, and that derived from a Sudanese preacher, the sect Salahiyya, was according to an 1899 letter by James Hayes Sadler established 12 years prior, thus in 1887. In their specific sect, they taught life sobriety in food and drink and abstaining from mind-altering substances. This sect was espoused until 1910 when its founder in Mecca denounced the Dervish via a letter. Nonetheless, some authors trivialized the role of religion The general consul of the Somali Coast Protectorate based in Berbera downplayed the role of antagonism to Christian missionaries to the Dervish that "originated in the Dolbahanta":

I do not consider that the presence of this Mission in Berbera has had anything to do with the movement that originated in the Dolbahanta

— Consul general

Douglas Jardine likewise deemphasized a religious role, rather attributing Dervish motives to "avarice" and them considering tribal confrontations as a "national sport". Hasan left the urban settlement and moved to preach in the countryside. His influence spread in the rural parts and many elders, as well as youth, became his followers. Hasan converted the influenced youth from different clans into a Muslim brotherhood, rallying to protect Islam from the influence of the Christian missionaries. Hassan stated the "British infidels have destroyed our [Islamic] religion and made our children their children". These formed the Hasan's armed resistance group to confront the colonial powers, and came to be known as Dervishes or Daraawiish, states Said M. Mohamed.

== Legacy ==
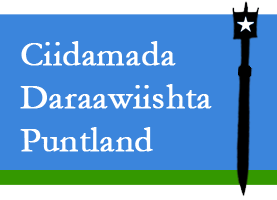
Logo of the Puntland Dervish Force, named in honor of the Dervishes

According to the Somali historian and novelist Farah Awl the Sayyid had a significant influence on Sheikh Bashir through listening to his poetry and conversations, an influence that impelled him to a "war with the British". After studying in the markaz in Beer he opened a Sufi tariqa (order) sometime in the 1930s, where he preached his ideology of anti-imperialism, stressing the evil of colonial rule and the bringing of radical change through war. His ideology was shaped by a millennial bent, which according to Marxist historian Eric Hobsbawm is the "hope of a complete and radical change in the world shorn of all its present deficiencies". The Dervish movement would subsequently inspire Sheikh Bashir, the nephew of Mohammed Abdullah Hassan who was named by him, to wage his own 1945 Sheikh Bashir Rebellion together with Habr Je'lo tribesmen against the British authorities in Somaliland.

The Dervish legacy in Somalia and Somaliland has been influential. It was the "most important revivalist Islamic movements" in Somalia, state Hasan and Robleh. The movement and particularly its leader has been controversial among Somalis. Some cherish it as the founder of modern Somali nationalism, while some others view it as an ambitious Muslim brotherhood militancy that destroyed Somalia's opportunity to move towards modernization and progress in favor of a puritanical Islamic state embedded with Islamic education – ideas enshrined in the contemporary constitution of Somalia. Yet others such as Aidid consider the Dervish legacy was one of cruelty and violence against those Somalis who disagreed with or refused to submit to Hasan. These Somalis were "declared infidels" and Dervish soldiers were ordered by Hasan to "kill them, their children and women and snatch all their property", according to Shultz and Dew. Another legacy that came out of the prolonged struggle and violence between the colonial powers and the Dervish movement, according to Abdullah A. Mohamoud, was the arming of the Somali clans followed by decades of destructive clan-driven militarism, violent turmoil, and high human costs well after the demise of the Dervish movement.

The Waqooyi Bari flag features a Dervish rider

Hasan and his Dervish movement have inspired a nationalistic following in contemporary Somalia. The military government of Somalia led by Mohamed Siad Barre, for example, erected statues visible between Makka Al Mukarama and Shabelle Roads in the heart of Mogadishu. These were for three major Somali History icons: Mohammed Abdullah Hassan of the Dervish movement, Stone Thrower and Hawo Tako. The Dervish period spawned many war poets and peace poets involved in a struggle known as the Literary war which had a profound effect on Somali poetry and Literature, with Mohammed Abdullah Hassan featuring as the most prominent poet of that Age. The flag of Waqooyi Bari, designed by Rooda Xassan features a Dervish cavalryman.

A Somali epic film, The Somali Dervish, released in 1985, was based on this movement.

== See also ==
- Hasna Doreh
- Nur Ahmed Aman
- Abdullahi Sadiq
- Haji Sudi
- History of Somalia
- Somali aristocratic and court titles

== Sources ==
- Jardine, Douglas (1923). The Mad Mullah Of Somaliland.
