= Herbert Humphrey Morris =

British Army officer (1874–1903)

Herbert Humphrey de Bohun Morris
- Morris in 1903, the Sphere
- Born: 1 September 1874
- Died: 17 April 1903 (aged 28); Agaarweyne, Ogaden
- Military career
- Allegiance: British Empire
- Branch: British Army
- Service years: 1894–1903
- Rank: Captain
- Units: East Kent Regiment; Central African Rifles; King's African Rifles
- Conflicts: Ashanti War; Dervish War; Battle of Agaarweyne †

Herbert Humphrey de Bohun Morris (1 September 1874 – 17 April 1903) was a British Army officer who served in the East Kent Regiment and the King's African Rifles. He served in Central and East Africa and was killed during the Dervish War at the Battle of Agaarweyne, also known as Gumburu. Morris was also a rugby football player who represented Bedford.

== Early life and military career ==
Herbert Humphrey de Bohun Morris was born on 1 September 1874. He began his military career on 3 February 1894, when he was commissioned as a second lieutenant in the 3rd and 4th Battalions of the Northamptonshire Regiment. On 6 June 1896, he transferred from the 3rd (Militia) Battalion of the Northamptonshire Regiment to the East Kent Regiment, receiving a commission as a second lieutenant in the regular army. He was promoted to lieutenant on 7 October 1897.

In June 1899, Morris began serving with the Central African Rifles, and was promoted to captain in June 1900. He also participated in the Ashanti War.

== Dervish War and death ==
Morris participated in the Dervish War against the Somali Dervish State led by Mohammed Abdullah Hassan. During the third Somaliland expedition in 1903, he served with the King's African Rifles with Lieutenant-Colonel Alexander Cobbe. On 17 April 1903, a reconnaissance company commanded by Captain Herbert Edward Olivey encountered Dervish forces near Gumburu Cagaarweyne. Lieutenant-Colonel Arthur William Valentine Plunket was subsequently dispatched with reinforcements to assist Olivey. After joining Olivey's company, Plunkett advanced farther from Cobbe's camp, where the combined force encountered a larger Dervish force. The British-led troops formed a defensive square but were eventually overwhelmed during the ensuing Battle of Agaarweyne, also known as the Battle of Gumburu.

Morris was among the British officers killed in the engagement, alongside Plunkett, Olivey, Captain J. Johnston-Stewart, Captain L. McKinnon, Lieutenant J. A. Gaynor and Lieutenant E. W. Bell. According to Douglas James Jardine, the British-led force suffered nine British officers and nearly 200 men killed, with another 29 wounded and only six unwounded survivors. The engagement and Morris's death were also recorded by Somali historian Jama Omar Issa in his work Taariikhdii Daraawiishta, which reproduced Jardine's account of the British casualties.

H. H. Morris (back row, second from right).

== Personal life ==
Morris was the son of Colonel Morris and played rugby football for Bedford Rugby Football Club, where he occupied a position in the three-quarter line. He was remembered for his participation during one of the club's successful seasons. Following his death in Somaliland, the club held a general meeting at the Embankment Hotel in April 1903, during which members voted to send a message of condolence to his father. The decision was reported in both the Bedfordshire Times and Independent and the Bedfordshire Mercury on 1 May 1903.
