= Arthur Plunkett (British Army officer) =

A British Major and Lieutenant-Colonel

Major (local Lt Col) Arthur William Valentine Plunkett
- Plunkett in 1903, the Graphic
- Born: 4 May 1868; Jabalpur, British Raj
- Died: 17 April 1903 (aged 34); Agaarweyne, Ogaden
- Cause of death: Bullet wounds, stab wounds
- Education: Royal Military College
- Military career
- Allegiance: British Empire
- Branch: British Army
- Service years: 1888-1903
- Unit: Manchester Regiment
- Commands: 2nd Battalion
- Conflicts: North-West Frontier campaigns; Miranzai Valley Expeditions; Siege of Malakand; Mohmand campaign of 1897–1898; Tirah campaign; Dervish War; Battle of Erego; Battle of Agaarweyne †
- Awards: India Medal

Lieutenant-Colonel Arthur William Valentine Plunkett (4 May 1868 – 17 April 1903) was a British Army officer who served as a major in the Manchester Regiment and held the local rank of lieutenant-colonel while commanding the 2nd Battalion of the King's African Rifles. He was killed during the Dervish War at the Battle of Agaarweyne, also known as Gumburu.

== Early life and education ==
Arthur William Valentine Plunkett was born on 4 May 1868, the son of Lieutenant-Colonel G. T. Plunkett, CB. He attended the Royal Military College, Sandhurst from 1886.

Plunkett was commissioned as a second lieutenant in the Manchester Regiment on 14 March 1888 and was promoted to lieutenant in November 1889. He was promoted to captain in 1897.

== Military career ==
=== British India service ===
Plunkett first saw active service in 1891, when he took part in the Second Miranzai Expedition with the 2nd Battalion of the Manchester Regiment. For his service in the expedition he received a medal with clasp.

During the North-West Frontier campaigns of 1897–1898, Plunkett served as assistant to the divisional transport officer with the Malakand expeditionary force. He participated in operations in Bajaur and the Mohmand country, for which he received the India Medal with clasp.

Plunkett subsequently served as assistant transport officer of the 1st Division during the Tirah campaign. During the campaign he took part in the capture of the Sampagha and Arhanga passes, operations against the Khani Khel, and operations in the Bazar Valley in December 1897. His service earned him an additional clasp to his medal.

=== Central Africa, Uganda and Gambia service ===
In March 1899, Plunkett was seconded for service in Central Africa and joined the 2nd (Central Africa) Battalion of the King's African Rifles. He subsequently served in Uganda and Central Africa. In 1901, Plunkett took part in a British expedition in the Gambia. He was mentioned in dispatches for his service and received a medal with clasp.

In June 1901, Plunkett was promoted to the substantive rank of major. In August 1902, Plunkett was granted the local rank of lieutenant-colonel. Although he continued to hold the substantive rank of major in the Manchester Regiment, he now commanded the 2nd Battalion of the King's African Rifles as a local lieutenant-colonel.

== Dervish War and death ==
After service in Uganda and Central Africa, he accompanied the battalion to British Somaliland during the campaign against the Dervish movement. Plunkett subsequently served in Colonel Eric Swayne's column during the fighting at the Battle of Erego. Contemporary newspapers credited his bravery with helping to prevent the engagement from becoming a more serious defeat.

The Battle of Agaarweyne began on 15 April 1903 after Captain Olivey, while conducting a scouting mission from Colonel Cobbe's position, reported a large body of mounted and dismounted Dervish forces approximately four miles from the camp. Cobbe sent Plunkett with a company of the 2nd King's African Rifles, 50 men of the 2nd Sikhs and two Maxim guns to reinforce Olivey and assist his return. Although his orders were confined to bringing Olivey's company back, Plunkett continued the advance after joining him and was drawn into contact with the main Dervish force. The Dervishes repeatedly charged the square from several directions, with cavalry attacking its front and flanks while spearmen and dismounted riflemen attacked from the rear. Neither rifle nor Maxim fire succeeded in stopping the repeated assaults, which continued as British casualties mounted and their ammunition diminished. Plunkett was among the first officers wounded and subsequently received a spear thrust, but continued fighting.

With the ammunition nearly exhausted and further defence of the square becoming impossible, Plunkett ordered the survivors to break formation and charge through the surrounding Dervish forces with fixed bayonets in an attempt to return to Cobbe's camp. They gained only a short distance before the force was overwhelmed. Plunkett and all the other British officers with the force were killed. Jardine recorded 187 men and nine British officers killed and 29 wounded, while Hamilton stated that only 41 men survived, of whom just six were unwounded. Hamilton described the reverse as a serious loss to the expedition, particularly because of the experience of the officers killed, and considered Plunkett one of its best officers, praising his "indomitable energy and dash", as well as his conduct under fire. He further noted the considerable respect in which Plunkett was held by the men of the 2nd King's African Rifles.

== Personal life ==
Plunkett married Winifred Hadwen, the daughter of Joseph Hadwen, a justice of the peace from Manchester, at St Mary Abbots in Kensington on 15 May 1901. At the time of Plunkett's death, his widow was living at Stoness, Ashurst, Tunbridge Wells. His estate was valued at £1,171 10s. 10d. gross and £1,042 10s. 10d. net.
