= Ogaden (clan) =

Somali clan

Ogaden بنو أوغادين
- Darod Somali Clan
- Ethnicity: Somali
- Location: (Somalia) Somalia; Ethiopia; Kenya
- Parent tribe: Darod
- Population: 5-6 million
- Language: (Somalia) Somali (Arab League) Arabic
- Religion: Sunni Islam

The Ogaden (Somali: Ogaadeen, Arabic: أوغادين) is one of the major Somali clans in the Horn of Africa.

== Overview ==
Members of the Ogaden clan primarily live in the central Ogaden plateau of Ethiopia (Somali Region), the North Eastern Province of Kenya, and the Jubaland region of Southern Somalia.

According to Human Rights Watch in 2008, the Ogaden is the largest Darod clan in Ethiopia's Somali Region, and may account for 40 to 50 percent of the Somali population in Ethiopia. The Ogaden clan "constitutes the backbone of the ONLF". In particular, the ONLF operates in Ogaden areas.

== History ==
=== Pre-colonial era ===
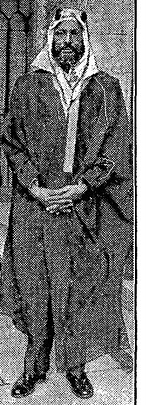
Sultan Bihi Momeen from the Ogaden.

The Ogaden were the principal force behind a series of Somali expansions that led to expulsion of the Wardey from west of the Jubba River and displacing the Boorana in parts of the North Eastern Province in the 19th century. Frank Linsly James, one of the first Europeans to travel deep into Ogaden territory while being accompanied by Lord Philips and armed with Martini–Enfield rifles, describes his first encounter with Ogadens in 1884.

After marching for six hours, we were joined by two Ogadayn natives, who said they would show us the wells, which were close at hand. They pointed to our guns and asked their use. When we said, "for killing men and beasts," they laughed, and replied " they would be no use against sticks, let alone swords and spears." A hornbill was sitting on a tree listening to this conversation, and echoed the natives' laugh with an assenting croak of scorn. Lord Phillips raised his despised firearm, and down fell the lifeless hornbill. Down, too, fell the Ogadayn natives, and remained for some time with their faces pressed against the ground, invoking the protection of the great Allah.

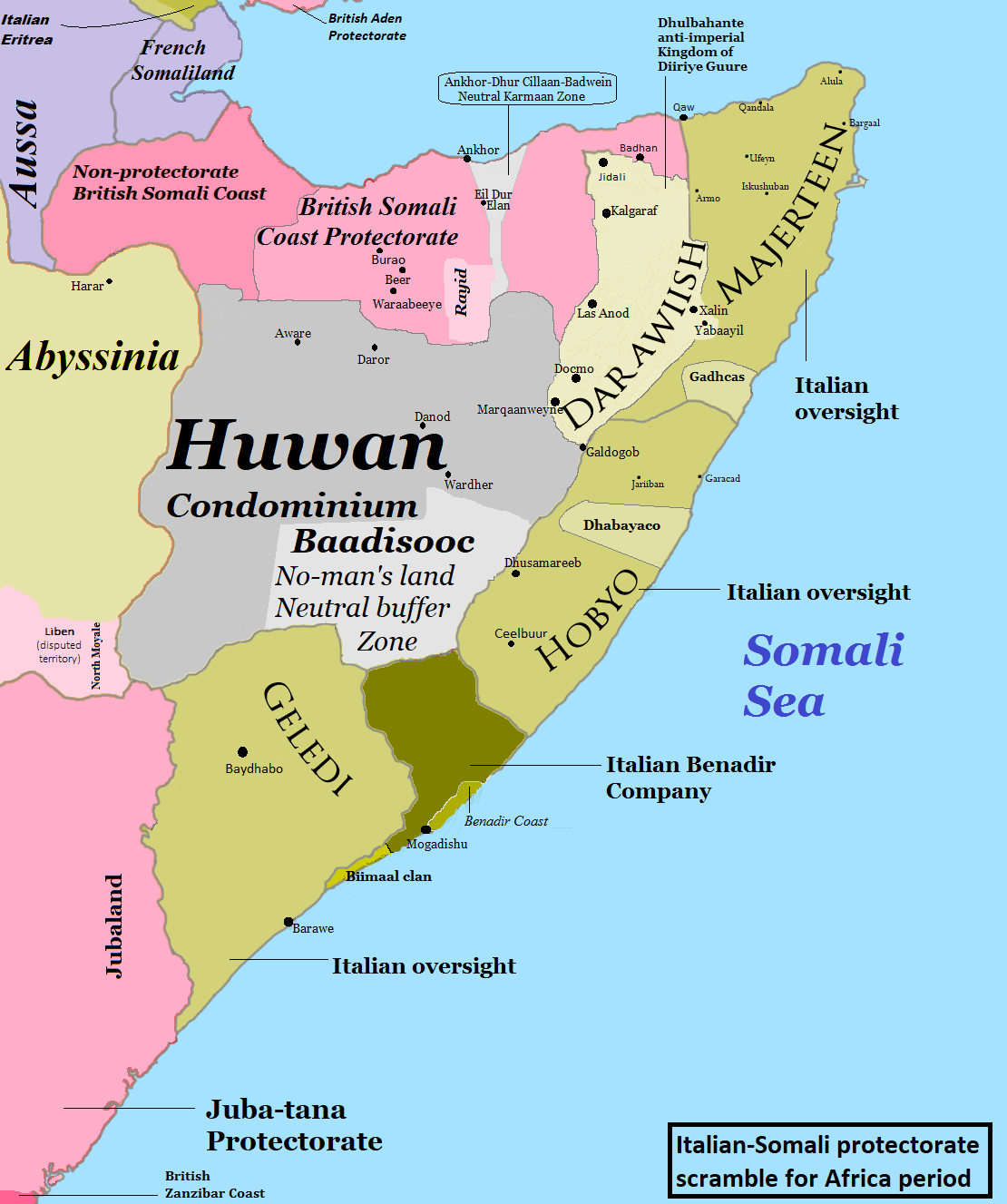
Hawan region around 1900

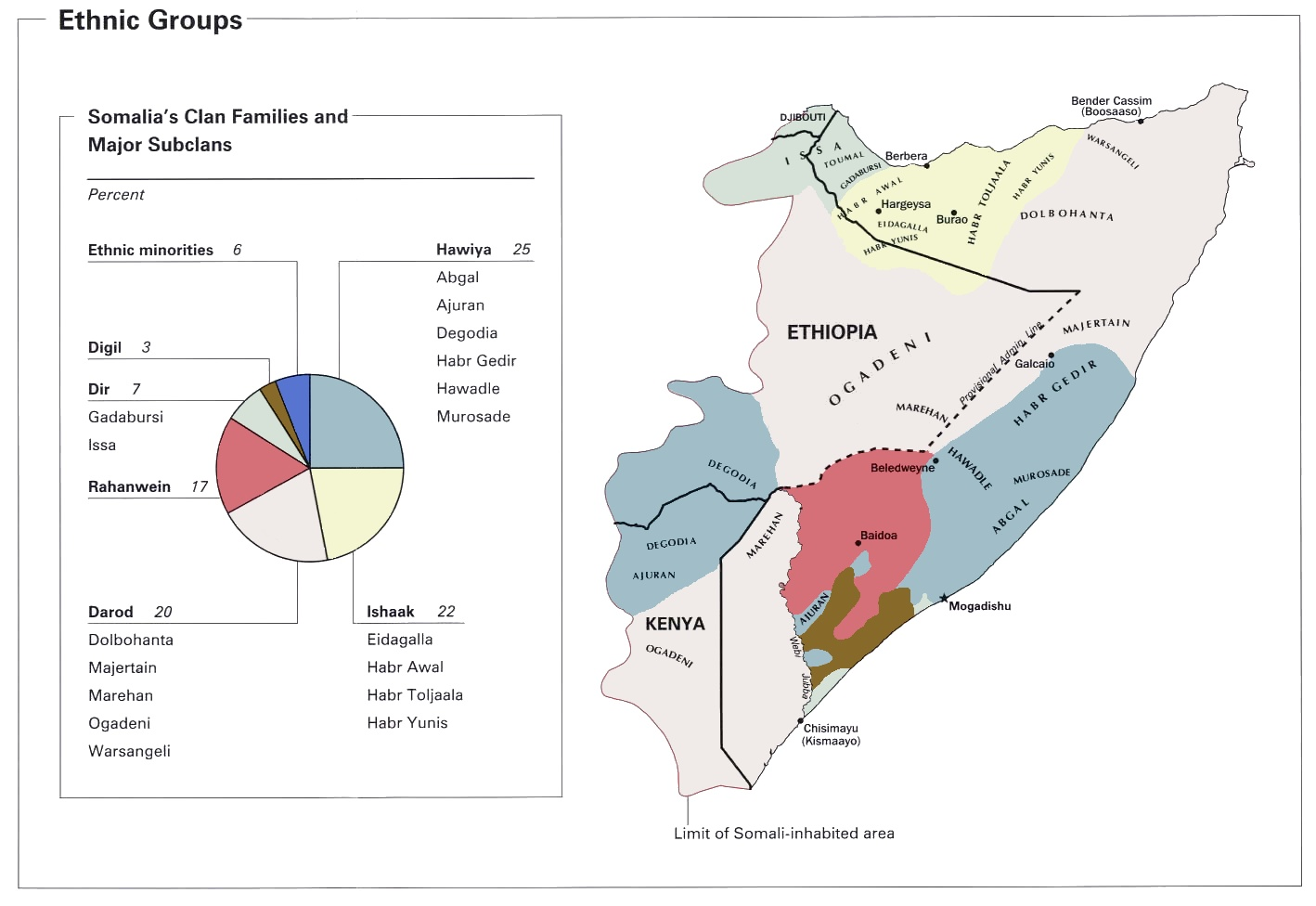
Traditional territory inhabited by the various Somali clans shown

=== Huwan era ===
The Huwan era constitutes the period of the Scramble for Africa when the Ogaden area and people (also known as kilinka shanaad or Somali Galbeed) were known as the Huwan. The easternmost parts of the Huwan had negligible to no influence by emperor Menelik II's or by Zewditu, depending on time period. Somali literature also refers to the territory subjected to Abyssinian expansionism, i.e. the Ogaden, contemporaneously and traditionally known as the Huwan:

Rayad oo Ingiriis iyo wixii raacsanaa ah, Dhabayaco oo Talyaani iyo kuwii raacsanaa ah, Huwan oo Amxaaro iyo wixii la halmaala ah ...

Translation:

Rayids were Somalis in a pact with the British, Dhabayaco those in a pact with Italians, Huwan those in a pact with the Amharans ...

In the subsequent period, during and after the second World War, the area of the Huwan region began to be referred to as Ogaden by the British, or simply British Ogaden in the aftermath of the East African Campaign in 1941.

== Groups ==
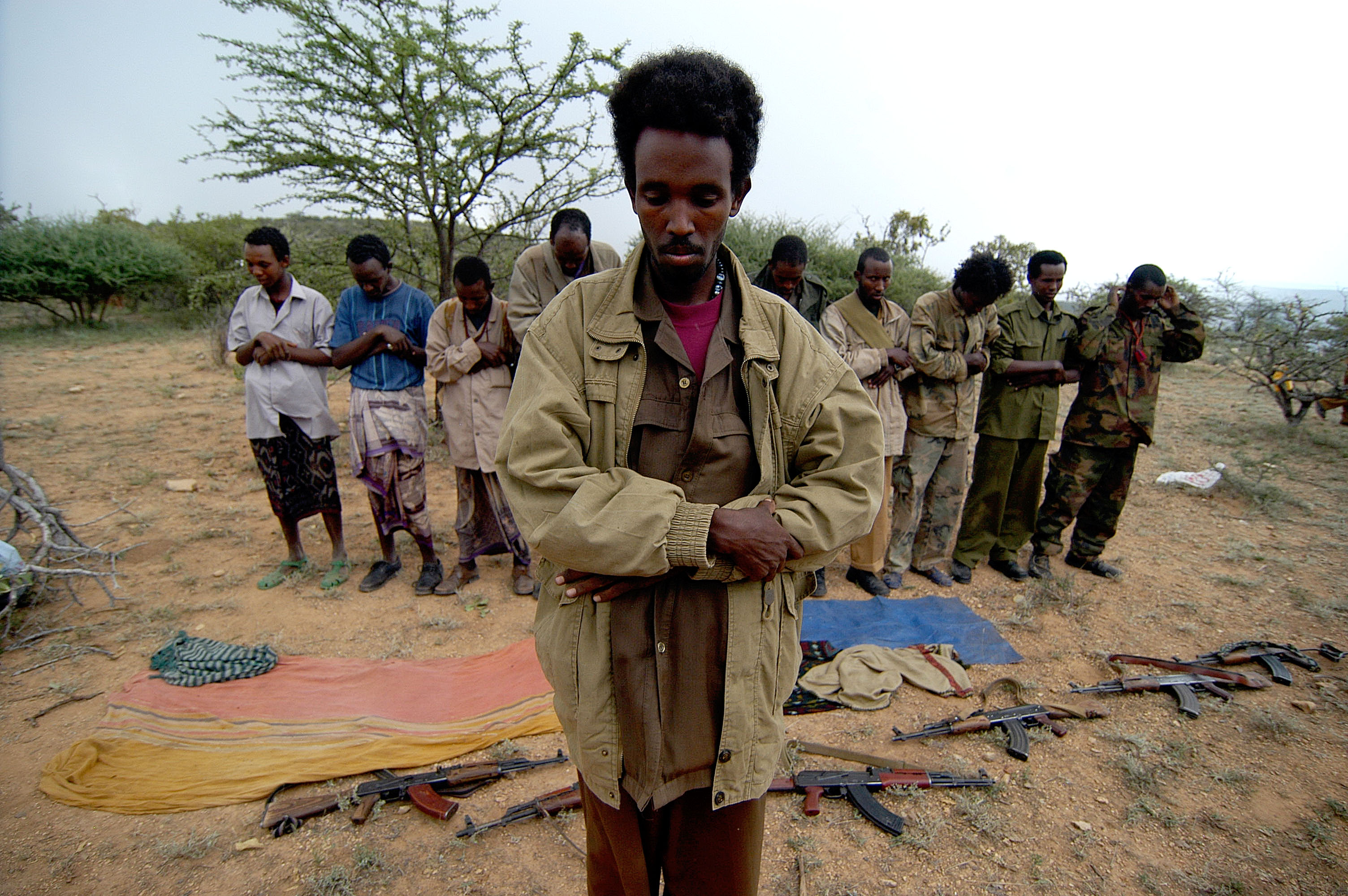
ONLF separatist rebels fighting for the right to self-determination for Somalis in the Somali Region of Ethiopia

- ONLF, a sociopolitical movement seeking self-determination
- Ragxun, was a minor segment of the 13 Darawiish administrative divisions, and was half Ogaden, half Cali Geri Dhulbahante.
- Miinanle, was a major Darawiish administrative divisions, and was one third Ogaden, one third Cali Geri Dhulbahante, one third Odala/ Bahgeri Dhulbahante

== Notable persons ==
- Mohammed Abdullah Hassan, the Sayyid, Mad Mullah; leader of the Dervish movement
- Ahmed Abdi Ogle, Former MP Kenyan Parliament (1963-1983), Assistant Minister, First Somali Deputy Mayor of Nairobi 1998.
- Mahamoud Mohamed Former Chief of General Staff of the Kenya Defence Forces from 1980 to 1998.
- Admiral Mohammed Omar Osman, Current ONLF chairman
- Aden Abdullahi Nur, also known as Aadan Gabyow was Somali politician and a military general in the Somali National Army. He served as Minister of Defence under President Siad Barre from 1986 to 1988.
- Bashir Bililiqo, Leader of the anti-Barre Somali Patriotic Movement
- Asli Hassan Abade, First Somali female pilot
- Farah Maalim, Former Deputy Speaker of the National Assembly of Kenya
- Aden Duale, The majority leader of the Kenyan parliament
- Sophia Abdi Noor, Politician, human rights activist, and the first woman from the North Eastern elected to the Parliament of Kenya
- Hassan Abdullah Hersi al-Turki, Islamist leader in Somalia and military leader in the Islamic Courts Union
- Mohamed Yusuf Haji, Former Minister of Defence and acting Minister of Internal Security and Provincial Affairs in Kenya
- Nuruddin Farah, Renowned writer and winner of the 1998 Neustadt International Prize for Literature
- Ahmed Madobe, President of Jubbaland, chairman of the Raskamboni movement
- Mohamed Dheere, Fighter in Juba River, and mentor of Ahmed Madoobe.
- Hassan Abdillahi, Founder and President of Ogaal Radio
- Hamza Abdi Barre, Current Prime Minister of Somalia
- Abdirahman Ali Hassan, Wajir county senator and the deputy minority leader in the senate 2013–2017, assistant minister of trade 2005–2007, Wajir south constituency MP, 2002–2013
- Aar Maanta, A Somali-British singer-songwriter, actor, composer, instrumentalist and music producer.
- Kaladi Madlay, Head of part of the Huwan region and highest ranked avowed Ogaden in the Darawiish in the early 1900s
- Huseen Dhiqle, Sayid's successor at Iimey and chief memorizer of his poems
- Hamed Sultan, An important disciple of the Sayid and teenage ruler of part of the Huwan
- Xuseen Dalal Iljeex, Governor of Huwan; ally of emperor Menelik II and opponent of Diiriye Guure
