= James Johnston-Stewart =

British Army officer (1871–1903)

- Johnston-Stewart in 1903, the Graphic
- Born: 1 April 1871
- Died: 17 April 1903 (aged 32); Agaarweyne, Ogaden
- Military career
- Allegiance: British Empire
- Branch: British Army
- Service years: 1888–1903
- Rank: Captain
- Units: Argyll and Sutherland Highlanders; Central Africa Regiment; King's African Rifles
- Conflicts: Tirah campaign; Fifth Anglo-Ashanti War; Second Boer War; Dervish War; Battle of Agaarweyne †
- Awards: India Medal (with clasp); Mentioned in despatches

James Johnston-Stewart (1 April 1871 – 17 April 1903) was a British Army officer who served in the Argyll and Sutherland Highlanders, the Central Africa Regiment and the King's African Rifles. His military career included service on the north-west frontier of India, in Ashanti and during the Second Boer War. He was killed during the Dervish War at the Battle of Agaarweyne, also known as the Battle of Gumburu. While in Somaliland, he was engaged in preparing a topographical map of the country and was recognised as a skilled marksman and big-game hunter.

== Early life and military career ==
James Johnston-Stewart was born on 1 April 1871, the son of Robert Hathorn Johnston-Stewart of Glasserton and Physgill, Wigtownshire, and his second wife, Anne Murray Maxwell, daughter of Sir William Maxwell, 6th Baronet, of Monreith. His father was a justice of the peace and deputy lieutenant who had previously served in the 93rd Highlanders and the 13th Light Dragoons.

Johnston-Stewart began his military career on 22 August 1888, receiving a commission as a second lieutenant in the 4th Battalion of the Argyll and Sutherland Highlanders. On 10 October 1891, he transferred from the militia to the regular army, receiving a commission as a second lieutenant in the same regiment. He was promoted to lieutenant on 4 January 1896.

During 1897–1898, Johnston-Stewart participated in operations on the north-west frontier of India under General Sir William Lockhart, serving with the Tochi Field Force. He received a campaign medal with clasp for his service. On 12 April 1899, he was seconded for service with the British Central Africa Rifles, subsequently serving with the King's African Rifles. He was promoted to captain on 11 January 1900.

In 1900, Johnston-Stewart took part in British military operations in Ashanti, followed by service during the Second Boer War early that year. He was mentioned in despatches for his service in both campaigns. In April 1902, he was appointed adjutant and quartermaster of the 2nd Battalion, King's African Rifles.

== Dervish War and death ==
Johnston-Stewart participated in the Dervish War against the Somali Dervish State led by Mohammed Abdullah Hassan. During the third British expedition in 1903, he served with the King's African Rifles with Lieutenant-Colonel Alexander Cobbe. While in Somaliland, Johnston-Stewart was engaged in preparing a topographical map of the country. He was also recognised as a skilled marksman and big-game hunter. Angus Hamilton later remarked that, had his work been completed, Johnston-Stewart's map would have become an important reference for the region.

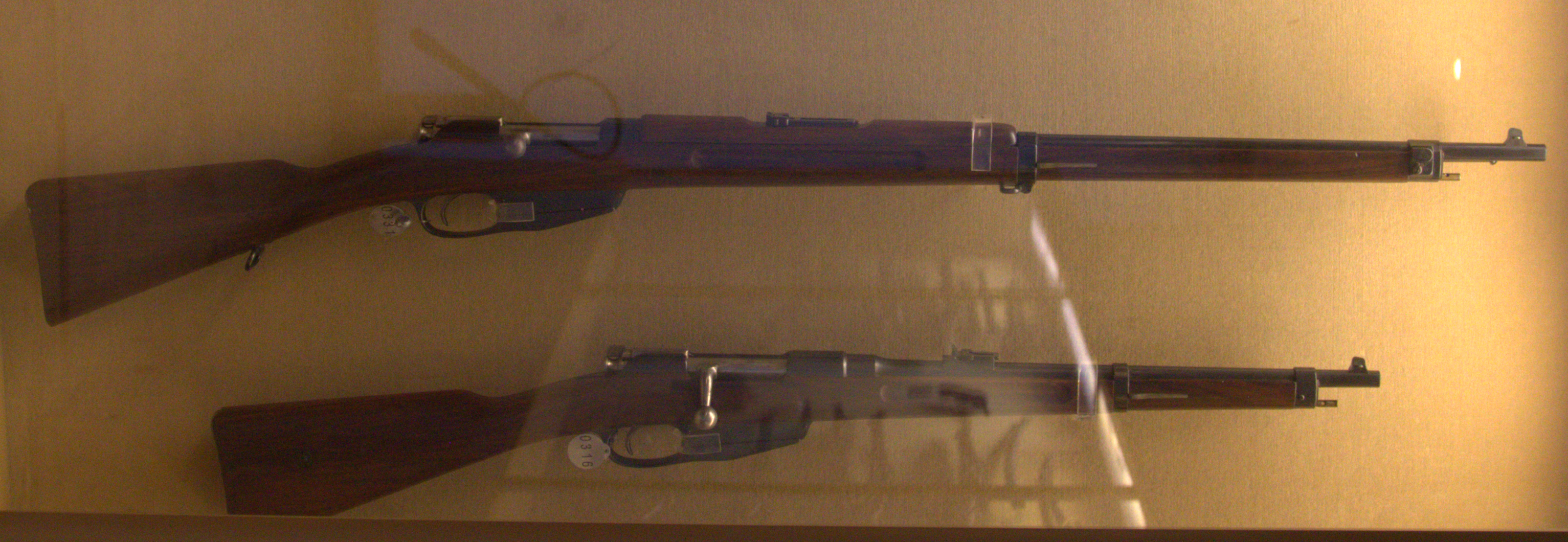
Mannlicher M1893 rifle and carbine variants. Johnston-Stewart possessed a Mannlicher sporting rifle, although its exact model is unknown.

On 17 April 1903, Johnston-Stewart accompanied Lieutenant-Colonel Arthur William Valentine Plunkett during the Battle of Agaarweyne, also known as the Battle of Gumburu. Plunkett's force had advanced from Cobbe's camp after being dispatched to assist a reconnaissance company under Captain Herbert Edward Olivey. The combined force formed a defensive square but was defeated by the Dervishes during the ensuing engagement. Shortly before the position was overrun, Johnston-Stewart reportedly dismantled a Maxim gun to prevent its subsequent use. In his later account of the campaign, Douglas James Jardine also noted that Johnston-Stewart had possessed a Mannlicher sporting rifle, whose cartridges were subsequently found among equipment associated with the Dervish forces. He was killed alongside Plunkett, Olivey and several other British officers. According to Jardine, the British-led force suffered nine British officers and around 200 men killed, with another 29 wounded.
