= Herbert Charles Vesey =

British Indian Army officer (1864–1903)

- Vesey in 1903, the Sphere
- Born: 17 January 1864
- Died: 17 April 1903 (aged 39); Agaarweyne, Ogaden
- Military career
- Allegiance: British Empire
- Branch: British Indian Army
- Service years: 1883–1903
- Rank: Captain
- Units: Lincolnshire Regiment; Indian Staff Corps; 2nd Sikh Infantry
- Conflicts: Burmese Expedition; Hazara Expedition of 1888; Dervish War; Battle of Agaarweyne †
- Awards: India General Service Medal

Herbert Charles Vesey (17 January 1864 – 17 April 1903) was a British Indian Army officer who served as a captain in the 2nd Sikh Infantry. He previously served with the Lincolnshire Regiment and Indian Staff Corps, and saw active service in Burma and the Hazara region before taking part in the Dervish War. Vesey was killed at the Battle of Agaarweyne in April 1903.

== Early life ==
Herbert Charles Vesey was born on 17 January 1864. He was a son of Edward Vesey, a former assistant paymaster-general, and was related to the De Vesci family. He was also a nephew of Major and Mrs Page of Manor Park, Redland.

== Military career ==
Vesey was commissioned as a lieutenant in the 3rd Battalion of the Queen's Own Royal West Kent Regiment on 26 September 1883. On 25 November 1885, he transferred to the Lincolnshire Regiment as a lieutenant.

Vesey was seconded for service with the Indian Staff Corps on 21 August 1887. He subsequently served in the Burmese Expedition of 1887–1888, for which he received a medal and clasp, and took part in the Hazara Expedition of 1888, earning an additional clasp. In 1889, his appointment as a lieutenant in the Bengal Staff Corps was reported alongside a number of other officers transferred from British regiments.

He was promoted to captain on 25 November 1896. Much of his later service was spent with the 2nd Sikh Infantry of the Indian Army.

== Dervish War and death ==
Vesey subsequently served in the Dervish War in the Horn of Africa as a captain in the 2nd Sikh Infantry. In April 1903, he formed part of a force with Lieutenant-Colonel Arthur William Valentine Plunkett, which was operating in support of Colonel Alexander Cobbe's column.

On 17 April, Plunkett's force encountered a much larger Dervish force at the Battle of Agaarweyne. During the fighting the column was surrounded and eventually overwhelmed after its ammunition became depleted. Vesey was initially reported missing following the destruction of the force.

His death was subsequently confirmed. Vesey was 39 years old and had served in the army for approximately seventeen years following his entry into the regular army in 1885. Contemporary reports noted his previous service in Burma and Hazara and his receipt of the India General Service Medal with two clasps.
