= Battle of Agaarweyne =

Historic (1903) battle site in Somalia

- Part of the Dervish War
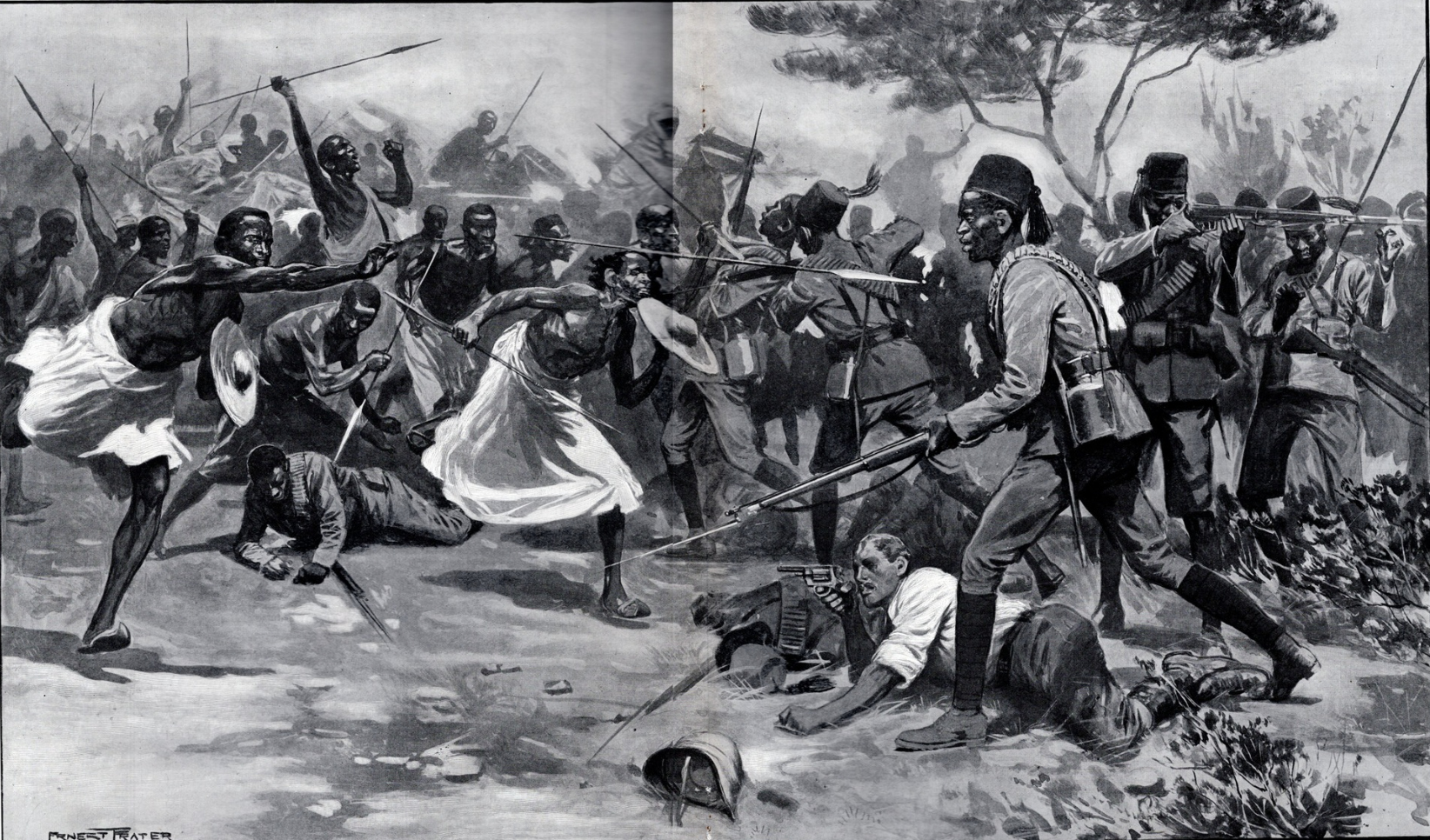
- Colonel Plunkett's Fight Against Overwhelming Odds with the Mullah in Somaliland c. 1903 by The Sphere
| Date | 15 April 1903 – 17 April 1903 |
| Location | Agaarweyne, Ogaden |
| Result | Dervish victory |

Belligerents
| Dervish State | British Empire; Ethiopian Empire Supported by: Kingdom of Italy |

Commanders and leaders
| Mohamed Abdullah; Diiriye Guure (WIA) | (British Empire) Arthur Plunkett †; (British Empire) Edward Olivey †; (British Empire) Herbert Vesey †; (British Empire) Johnston-Stewart †; (British Empire) Herbert Morris † |

Strength
| 6,000 infantry 4,000 mounted horsemen | 4,041 colonial troops |

Casualties and losses
| Heavy | 9 officers killed 200 colonial troops killed |

The Battle of Agaarweyne (also known as Gumburu) was fought on 15 April 1903, in Agaarweyne between the British under Colonel Plunkett and the forces of Haji Muhammad Abdullah Hassan. Reinforced with a superiority in firearms, Muhammad was victorious and defeated the allied force. This battle sent shockwaves across the Horn of Africa.

== Background ==
Following a prior defeat at Beerdhiga, the British regrouped their forces in the Horn of Africa under new leadership, focusing their efforts against Sayid Muhammad Abdullah Hassan, a figure they referred to as the "Mad Mullah." The British devised a plan to launch a three-pronged attack on the Daraawiish. The first front, from Hobyo, consisted of 2,296 soldiers, including British and Boer troops from South Africa, as well as Somali, Yao, and Sikh fighters. The second front moved from Berbera, passing through Buhodle, with a force of 1,745 soldiers, which included Somalis, Sudanese, Sikhs, and Yaos, alongside British Royal Engineers. The third front advanced from Jigjiga via Dhagahbur, consisting mostly of Ethiopian troops accompanied by British officers. The operation was coordinated with Italy on the Hobyo front and Ethiopia on the Jigjiga front. According to Mohamed Haji Mukhtar, both Italy and Ethiopia had agreed to support the British forces against the Dervishes, as the three colonial powers shared an interest in containing and defeating the Dervish movement. The three forces were intended to converge at Agaarweyne by mid-October 1903.

== Battle ==
Dervish State intel had prior knowledge of the approaching three columns of British troops and had already prepared for battle, while the British, unaware of this, intended to launch a surprise attack. On the afternoon of April 14th, the column from Hobyo arrived at the Geledi well, where they encountered a Dervish man with a water-carrying camel. When interrogated, he claimed, "I am not aware of any Dervishes here". They detained him, but he escaped at night and alerted the Dervishes about the British army's strength, weapons, conversations, and overall situation. On April 15th, the British column reached Agaarweyne and set up a large defensive encampment, unaware that the Dervish forces were preparing for a jihad to be launched at dawn. The Dervish state split their forces into two groups and attacked the British from four directions at first light, following a well-coordinated plan. The first Dervish forces fought until around 11:00 A.M. on April 16th, after which they were replaced by the second shift as planned. The fighting, fierce and continuous, lasted until late in the day. Meanwhile, the British government had coordinated efforts with Italy on the Hobyo front and Ethiopia on the Jigjiga front, as the colonial powers sought to crush the Dervish threat. However, the Dervishes, fully aware of the British maneuverers, had prepared meticulously, even deciding the type of horses to deploy during the heat of the day and the cooler hours of the morning.

Many Dervishes who took part in the battle reported that the British left the army alone to fight, and tied themselves in pairs to leave and run away. and no one is out of place. At around 1:00 p.m., there was no movement or firing from either side. What happened and the war ended? The Dervish, chanting songs and killing songs, gathered the fire, the bullets and the wealth of the infidels.

On April 17th, according to accounts from the African survivors, after encountering Olivey roughly a mile from the camp, Plunkett united his forces with him. Instead of retreating, they formed a defensive square with the Sikhs positioned at the front, marching west for about six miles. They reached an open clearing encircled by dense bush, where a large group of dervishes had gathered to confront them. The troops faced an overwhelming assault from around 4,000 mounted fighters and 6,000 infantry, seemingly under the direct leadership of the Mullah. With a fanatical disregard for death often displayed in the Mullah's presence, the Dervishes launched an attack from all sides. First came the horsemen, followed by riflemen on foot, and finally masses of spearmen, whose sheer momentum broke through the square despite the intense gunfire from maxims and rifles. Plunkett was among the first to be struck, suffering injuries from both bullets and spears. As their ammunition ran low, he ordered a breakout, instructing his men to charge back toward the zariba using their bayonets. However, by this point, many had already been killed or wounded. The remaining soldiers rushed forward, but only a few managed to make significant progress. The maxim guns were destroyed before the enemy could seize them, and soon the small force was overrun and overwhelmed.

At 11.45 a.m. some of the Somalis at Cobbe's encampment reported that they had heard the sound of firing. It was scarcely audible, but Cobbe sent out some mounted troops to investigate. An hour later one of them returned carrying Plunkett's guide. wounded, upon his pony, who said that the force had been cut up. Cobbe sent back reports to Manning, and dispatched more mounted men for news, realizing that at least a hundred of the 250 men with him were needed to defend the camp, and that it was already too late to send out reinforcements. By now survivors from the battle were coming in, assisted by the mounted patrols. They were followed by Dervish horsemen right up to the zariba, who had to be driven off with shrapnel, though their scouts remained closely on the watch.

It is reported that the British army that went into the war left only six men, as written by H. F. Pervosi Battersby said:

"After fighting magnificently, the British force, its ammunition exhausted, was overwhelmed; only 41 men rejoined Colonel Cobbe's column, of whom but 6 were unwounded; our loss being 9 British officers and over 200 men."

The Dervish state's forces decisively defeated the English army, and they even managed to push back the reinforcements sent by the English. The English forces retreated peacefully from the battlefield, and the Dervish also left the battlefield carrying a great victory. They not only took the loot and goods from the battlefield, but also left behind the English dead bodies, along with some sheep and camels, and the Dervish returned with honor. The English army received a harsh lesson that day as they fled before the mighty Dervish forces.

== Aftermath ==
An interesting story about the battle's aftermath was told by Mohammed Haji Hussein who was a well-known elder of the area. He said, "During the battle, I was staying with the people near the place called Faal, close to the Kebri Dahar area. After the enemy fled, I saw the battlefield with the bodies of those killed, and there was a huge tree that stood in the middle of the battlefield. As I stood there, I noticed an eagle circling above, and my father said to me, 'This is a sign. Where the eagle goes, something significant has happened.' I looked and saw the eagle land on a spot, and I knew that the battle was over, and victory had been achieved.'" He later said "My father's prediction came true just a few days later. The eagle had been hovering over the battlefield where a fierce fight had taken place. The tree under which the bodies lay had been the scene of the fiercest fighting, and the enemy was completely vanquished."

According to Walter Spearce of the Evening Express, Diiriye Guure, the head of the Dhulbahante clan, had a "powerful" status in the Dervish State and was present at the Agaarweyne battle, although sustaining injuries therein. According to Kapteijns, Dheri was one of the Dervish State's leaders wherein he is called the most "courageous" and "best warriors" of the Dervish State's army at the battle of Agaarweyne wherein he died in this battle.

This battle was described as so deadly that the aforementioned birds of prey who were dissected by the Dervishes were found to have human remains of the casualties inside:

Nin la oran jirey Maxamuud Gurey ayaa gorgorkii dooxay, waxaana calooshiisii laga soo saaray 500 oo xiniinyo rag ah. Inta dhabannada la qabsaday ayaa lays wada eegay oo waxa la yiri, 'War maanta geyiga Soomaaliyeed wax weyn baa ka dhacay oo aan horay loo arkin bal aan war dhawrro

Translation:

A man called Mahamud Gurey dissected an eagle. Once dissected he found the remains of 500 human testicles inside. Everyone grabbed their own cheeks surprised and looked at one another and said "It seems that the lands of the Somalis have experienced an event of an extreme magnitude, the likes of which have never been seen before! We must investigate further.

One of the famous warriors, Mahamed Issa, remembered the battle vividly. He said, "Even though the English soldiers had many reinforcements, they were no match for the might and strength of the Dervish State. The battle was fierce, but in the end, the Dervish State emerged victorious. The soldiers who remained told us that it was the biggest defeat the English had ever suffered in the region, and that the Dervish State were stronger than they had ever expected."

He also remembered the words of the elders, who sang:

Raxanraadkiyo hawsha, kama raalli ahayne
Rag baas bay damciyey, Rabbina wayla iraaday
Geel baana raadi lahaa, waxba yaan rimaydiisyo
Ratigiisa rareeriyo, Ramaggiisa kaxayne,
Kol haddaan rubaddayda reerihii nabad geeyey
Rabbiyow mahaddad!!!

Hindigaa ridi doona,
Soodaantaa rogi doonta
Yamyamkaan rinjijiirsan,
Rag cad baynnu u geyn
"Reedhi" baynnu. ahaan,
Ruqe weeye farduu
Rasaastoodu ma fiicna, Rabbigay talin maayo
Rugtoodaynu galnaa, ninba reer ha kaxaysto
Sow wixii na hor roorayee, Raggi ay qoranaysiyo
Rogay gaalyada maaha eey!!!

Translation:

They tried to force me into a task, but I wasn't willing,
They planned evil, but God was against them,
I would have gone searching for camels, but no illusions will distract me,
I didn't carry the luggage of a camel or lead it to pasture,
Since I have led my people safely to peace,
Praise be to You, my Lord!

The Indians will be driven away,
And the empire will be overthrown,
The one trembling with fear will meet brave men,
We will face men in white,
We will charge with the 'reedhi' (traditional Somali spear),
The spear is like a horse,
Their bullets are ineffective, for God does not favor them,
We will enter their camp, each man leading his clan,
Is it not those who charged ahead of us,
The men they recruited and the forces of the infidels? They shall be overturned!

Haji Saleh Guled, one of the prominent religious ulama in the area, sent a letter to the Sayyid after the Battle of Cagaarweyne, informing him of the victory. The letter was written in Arabic:

قتلنا الابيض ستمائة ونيف * وجعلنا الباقين كالفراش المبثوث

Translation:

We killed more than six hundred whites, and made the rest like scattered moths.

Douglas Jardine wrote the following about the casualties:

"As has already been stated, all the British officers with the force had been killed. In addition to Plunkett and Olivey, you also included Captain J. John-Stewart of the Argyll and Sutherland Highlanders, Captain H. H. de B. Morris of the East Kent Regiment, Captain L. MacKinnon of the Notts Derby Regiment and Lieutenant J.A. Gaynor of the 2nd Regiment. Our total casualties were 9 British Officers killed, and 187 men killed and 29 wounded. There were only six unwounded survivors. But it had almost a Pyrrhic victory for the Dervishes; and the dead bodies lying in heaps around the spot where the square had stood were a grim monument to the gallant defenders. Indeed, it subsequently transpired that, not long before the rejoicings of his victorious Dervishes yelled to depression as they grimly reflected that the small indeed force, before being overwhelmed by vastly superior numbers, had inflicted a loss in killed and wounded, had inflicted a loss more than they had ever suffered on any previous occasion."
