= Arthur Plunkett =

Arthur Plunkett may refer to:

- Arthur Plunkett, 8th Earl of Fingall (1759–1836), Roman Catholic Irish peer
- Arthur Plunkett, 9th Earl of Fingall (1791–1869), Irish peer
- Arthur Plunkett (British Army officer) (1868–1903), British Army lieutenant-colonel killed during the Dervish War
