= Jama Farah =

Garad of the Dhulbahante Garadate
- Reign: 1920s
- Coronation: 1920s
- Predecessor: Ar dheil
- House: House of Garaad Shirshore; Ruler of Ciid-Nugaal

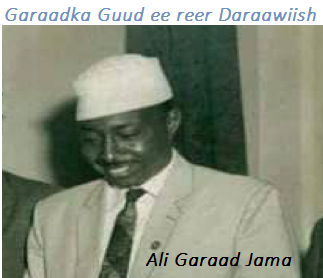

Garad Jama "Farah" was the 18th garad or sultan of the Dhulbahante Garadate, from the 1920s until 1960. His surname isn't Farah, but he acquired the title to distinguish Farah Garad from the garad/sultan of the equally sized Mahamuud Garad clan and that of the Bah Nugaal clan.

His father, the garad or sultan Ali, the immediate predecessor of Diiriye Guure, died in the patricide enacted by his older brother, sultan Mohamud Ali

== Predecessors ==
Prior to the Darawiish, the 'Iid-Nugaal was subdivided into a northern and southern Dhulbahante garadate. However the Garad was not necessarily the most powerful figure of this polity, with Richard Burton reporting that the Abbaan, in modern parlance chiefly used as the derivative abaanduul meaning protector, on occasion exhibiting greater influence. For example, Husayn Haji, the Abbaan of the northern Dhulbahante was depicted as dictating terms for travellers in the mid-19th century:

The reason for this step was that Husayn Haji, an Agil of the Dulbahantas and a connection of the Abban, demanded, as sole condition for permitting Lieutenant Speke to visit “Jid Ali,”

Likewise, the Somali clans of this period didn't necessarily align on the basis of clan, with for example the southern Dhulbahante siding with the Warsangeli in their disputes with the northern Dhulbahante in the mid-19th century, according to explorer Richard Francis Burton:

But there is no hostility between the Southern Dulbahantas and the Warsingali, on the old principle that “an enemy's enemy is a friend.”

The reign of the 14th garad of the Dhulbahante, namely Garad Koore-baas was arguably the most backward period of the Dhulbahante Garadate, with Warsangeli sultan Cawl stating that it is too dangerous to even visit during the mid-19th century:

To this the Sultan replied, that as far as his dominions extended the traveller was perfectly at liberty to go where he liked; but as for visiting the Dulbahantas, he could not hear of or countenance it

The predecessor to Diiriye Guure, i.e. Garad Ali 4th, was sheltered from two foreign incursions by being an interior rather than coastal clan, with prior to the British, the Egyptian Khedivate likewise making incursions in Somali territories, preliminarily in 1870, with a full Egyptian Khedivate occupation on the Somali coast by 1874:

Egypt, which then crept southwards. In 1870 it acquired the coast between Bulhar and Berbera, and established garrisons at those ports as well as at Zeila, purchasing the Sultan's suzerain rights over the latter town for an annual payment of 15,000 [pounds]. In 1874 Raoof Pacha, at the head of 4,000 men, took possession of Harrar

Former colonial administrator Douglas James Jardine stated that Diiriye Guure and his predecessor Garad Ali the 4th, were the only major Somali tribal chieftains who did not sign a colonial treaty with European colonial power:

Early in 1885 Great Britain concluded separate protective treaties with all the Somali tribes now living under her protection, except the Warsangeli, who concluded a treaty in 1886, and the Dolbahanta, with whom no treaty has been made.

— Douglas Jardine

and consciences were salved by the reflection that our obligation to protect the tribe from the man whom they themselves had created, supported and followed, was less than our obligations to the Ishaak tribes who had for the most part resisted the movement from its very start. Moreover, as will be recalled, the Dolbahanta were the only tribe with whom we had no formal protective treaty.

— Douglas Jardine

The War Office replied that His Majesty's Government had no treaty with the Dolbahanta, and that to put the General's policy into effect would involve assurances of protection, which would still further add to our liabilities in a direction which had already cost so much.

— Douglas Jardine

The mid-19th century predecessor of Diiriye Guure, namely Koore-baas, and his Dhulbahante constituents w ere likewise described in these self-determination and autonomy inclined ways by author Said Sheikh Samatar:

... unlike other pastoralists, the Dulbahante are also excellent horsemen. Even by pastoral standards, the Dulbahante have a reputation for pride, independence and martial spirit

— Said Samatar

== Defiance ==
According to I.M. Lewis, the three successor Garads to Diiriye Guure between the post-Darawiish period and Somalia's independence, namely Garad Mohamed the 4th, Garad Aardheel and Garad Jama the 1st, likewise continued in the custom of their predecessors in rejecting a treaty:

Garaad Jaama ' of the Faaraḥ Garaad has only recently been recognized, having successfully maintained his prestige by opposing the Administration

— IM Lewis

== SYL ==
Despite the increase in cultivation and its profits, the Dhulbahante during the 1940s and 1950s largely continued in their tradition as reer guuraa (i.e. pastoralist), whilst calling cultivators as reer qodeed (diggers) and reer beereed (gardeners).

According to I.M. Lewis, the garad Jama Farah like his predecessors, continued in the custom of aversion to colonial powers:

The Garaad of the Mahamuud Garaad, is recognized by the Government and receives a stipend . Garaad Jaama of the Faaraḥ Garaad has only recently been recognized, having successfully maintained his prestige by opposing the administration

— IM Lewis

The primary antagonism between Garad Jama Farah and the British was the Garad's support of SYL, thus furthering cross-border multi-nationalism:

Gerad Jama, a traditional chief of the Bah Arasama Dulbahante, with authority over the most numerous of Dulbahante subclans, the Farah Garad, supported the SYL as a protest against the government's local authority system, which had the effect of reducing his powers

— James Coleman

== Taxation ==
Prior to his taxation plans, Garad Jama was in self-induced exile in Mogadishu:

Ali Gerad Jama, the university - educated son of the Gerad ( chief ) Jama Farah ( who went into voluntary exile in Mogadiscio from 1952 to 1958 as a result of his conflict with the British administration ) provided the main drive behind the party.

The taxation plans for the Dhulbahante occurred in 1957, resembling a type of regulation and administration in return for public services and expenditure from Garad Jama Farah:

It is of interest, however, to note that a clan meeting of the Dulbhante at Las Anod in December 1957, which discussed matters of general Dulbahante interest including the maintenance of peace, education and closer relations with Government, proposed the establishment of a clan betterment fund, contributions to which were to be received by Garaad Jaama. Vestiges of a similar degree of centralized administration on the pattern of a Muslim Sultanate, survive today in the Protectorate amongst the Warsangeli.

== Patricide of father ==
The predecessor of Diiriye Guure, Garad or Sultan Ali, passed away in a patricide, by his older son, Mohamud, the older brother of garad Jama Farah:

Such was their belief in him that when the Sultan of the Dolbahanta, Ali Gerad, defected from the Derwish cause, his own son pleaded for the privilege of killing him "is meet that the infidel father be put to death by the believing son who is deprived of a place in paradise."

After the commotion and fleeing by many Dervishes to the Huwan, they were able to reestablish themselves at their original base in the Nugaal Valley when restitution was paid:

the Dervishes could not remain in the Ogaadeen and they hastily withdrew to the Nugaal, where the Sayyid propitiated the Dulbahante for the moment by a massive payment of blood monies.

The poem Dhurwaa Ariga Eebaa Leh by Dhiqle starts name-checking the two sons of Garad Ali IV as "Laba ilmo-Garad baa leh" i.e., whimsically telling certain hyenas these livestock belong to his two sons i.e. Garad Mohamud and Garad Jama, although insinuating they are still young, after certain spotted hyenas stole or ravished livestock intended for the haroun.

In 1899 either his father Sultan Ali or his successor Diiriye Guure gave his daughter to the Sayid, at a time the Darawiish tariqa permitted a form of marriage called sighar, wherein multiple parallel marriages occurred with brides and bridegrooms being exchanged.
