= Kaladi Madlay =

Somali Dervish general

Kaladi Madlay was the head of a portion of the Huwan region in the early 1900s decade as well as the highest ranked avowed Ogaden within the Darawiish in the early years of this decade until his purported desertion in 1903. He was succeeded as leader of the Huwan region by Hamed Sultan.

== Position ==
The Sayid had personally disavowed himself of wordly leisures and his tribal lineage which was Ogaden in the aftermath of the Gurdumi incident where the Ogaden turned against the Sayid. He also did as such in a summoning letter to Somali clans:

I also inform you that I am a pilgrim and a holy fighter and have no wish to gain power and greatness in this world: neither am I of the Dolbahanta, the Warsangeli, the Mijjertein, nor the Ogaden. And I am not of the hypocrites; I am a Dervish, hoping for God’s mercy and consent and forgiveness and guidance, and I desire that all the country and the Moslems may be victorious by God’s garace.

— The Sayid

As such, this makes Kaladi Madlay the most senior ranked avowed Ogaden in the Darawiish. A British war report in 1903 stated that Kaladi Madlay was the head of the Ogaden tribe:

Kaladi Madlay, of the Qgaden tribe, who generally follows the Mullah some days after each movement. These men are the heads of their respective tribes, and are all wealthy and powerful. It is impossible to estimate the Mullah's present strength.

== Role ==
A March 1903 telegram from the British Aden colony stated that most of the Sayid's followers were of the Dhulbahante tribe, that Madlay commanded the Darawiish cavalry, and that Madlay may have opted to abandon the Darawiish prior to the 1903 Battle of Agaarweyne between the European colonizers and Darawiish which would have resulted in his fellow Ogaden deserting too.

offended the Dolhohanta, who are his most numerous supporters ... It is reported that the Keladi Madlay, ... commanding the Mullah's horsemen, intends to desert, and if this proves true, then he will take with him most of his followers

The telegram also states that the British downplayed the cost of the anti-Darawiish expedition and that the British supplies came via Hobyo and Berbera. The subsequent Agaarweyne battle resulted in a decisive victory for the Darawiish with the entire British force as well as their African and Asian levies being destroyed.
