= Herbert Edward Olivey =

British Army officer (1871–1903)

- Olivey in 1903, the Graphic
- Born: 18 January 1871
- Died: 17 April 1903 (aged 32); Agaarweyne, Ogaden
- Spouse: Charlotte Ellen Daniell (m. 1899)
- Children: 1
- Military career
- Allegiance: British Empire
- Branch: British Army
- Service years: 1893–1903
- Rank: Captain
- Unit: Suffolk Regiment
- Conflicts: West African expedition (1901); Dervish War; Battle of Agaarweyne †
- Awards: West Africa campaign medal with clasp

Herbert Edward Olivey (18 January 1871 – April 1903) was a British Army officer who served in the Suffolk Regiment and the King's African Rifles. He participated in military operations in West and East Africa, including the 1901 West African expedition up the Gambia and the Dervish War. He was killed during the latter campaign at the Battle of Agaarweyne.

== Early life and military career ==
Herbert Edward Olivey was born on 18 January 1871, the youngest son of Colonel Sir W. R. Olivey, KCB. He entered the British Army from the Militia on 4 October 1893, receiving a commission as a second lieutenant in the Suffolk Regiment. He was promoted to lieutenant on 30 May 1896.

On 24 June 1899, Olivey was seconded for service with the British Central Africa Rifles. He was promoted to captain on 24 February 1900, replacing Captain C. A. H. Brett, who had been taken prisoner of war. Olivey subsequently served with the King's African Rifles and was employed in Central and East Africa.

In 1901, Olivey participated in the West African expedition up the Gambia, for which he received a campaign medal with clasp.

== Dervish War and death ==
Olivey participated in the Somaliland campaign against the Somali Dervish State led by Mohammed Abdullah Hassan, serving as a captain attached to the King's African Rifles. During the third British expedition in 1903, he served with Lieutenant-Colonel Alexander Cobbe, whose column had been dispatched from Galadi to reconnoitre the route towards Wardair. On 17 April, Cobbe ordered two reconnaissance parties, one of which consisted of a company of the 2nd Battalion, King's African Rifles, under Olivey's command. The company departed at 4:45 a.m., and approximately three hours later Olivey reported that he had encountered no enemy and intended to return. At 8:05 a.m., however, he sent another message reporting the advance of Dervish cavalry and infantry, requesting reinforcements as his company withdrew.

Lieutenant-Colonel Arthur Plunkett was subsequently dispatched with another company of the King's African Rifles, 50 men of the 2nd Sikhs, and two Maxim guns to assist Olivey. Shortly before Plunkett's departure, Cobbe received a final message from Olivey stating that his company was within a mile and a half of camp and was not engaged in fighting. According to subsequent accounts, Plunkett encountered Olivey's company but advanced farther from Cobbe's camp, where the combined force was attacked by a Dervish force at the Battle of Agaarweyne, also known as the Battle of Gumburu. The British-led troops formed a square, with the 2nd Sikhs positioned at the front, but were eventually overwhelmed after repeated Dervish attacks and the exhaustion of their ammunition. Plunkett ordered the remaining troops to break formation and attempt to return to Cobbe's camp, but the force was defeated. Olivey was killed alongside Plunkett and the other British officers accompanying the force. The circumstances of the battle were subsequently reconstructed from survivor testimony, as none of those officers survived.

== Personal life ==
Olivey married Charlotte Ellen Daniell on 1 June 1899 at Mylor, Cornwall. She was the youngest daughter of R. A. Daniell of Little Park, Mylor. The couple had one daughter, Ellen Elizabeth May Olivey, whose engagement was announced in July 1937. At the time, Olivey's widow was residing in Flushing, Cornwall.
