= Jama Omar Issa =

Aw Jamaac Cumar Ciise
- جامع عمر عيسى
- Born: Jaamac Cumar Ciise; 1922; Qandala, Somalia
- Died: 6 January 2014 (aged 91–92); Djibouti City, Djibouti
- Occupations: linguist, historian, scholar
- Writing career
- Period: 1960s–1990s
- Subjects: Dervish Movement, Political Islam, Somali Studies
- Notable works: Diiwaanka Sayid Maxamed (1970); Taariikhdii Daraawiishta iyo Sayid Maxamed Cabdulle Xasan (1976)

Aw Jama Omar Issa (Somali: Jaamac Cumar Ciise, Arabic: جامع عمر عيسى) (c.1922 – 6 January 2014) commonly known as Aw Jaamac, was a Somali scholar, historian and collector of oral literature of Somalia. He wrote the first authoritative study of Dervishes, the polity of monarch Diiriye Guure.

== Biography ==
A recorder and collector of oral history and poetry. The title aw or sheikh generally indicates a man of religion; Aw Jama is therefore called Sheikh Jama as well. Jamaac is from Buuhoodle, Somalia. His formal education was Arabic and Islamic and he became a certified teacher in Hargeisa in Somalia in 1957. In the early 1960s, Aw Jama moved to Mogadishu to teach and continue to collect the poems of Mohammed Abdullah Hassan, known in the West as the "Mad Mullah". Aw Jamac Cuumar Ciise has 14 children and 74 grandchildren.

Jama has spent some twenty years collecting and transcribing orally transmitted poetry before publishing it in Diiwaanka Sayid Maxamed, edited by Madbacadda Qaranka, Xamar, 1974. The name "Sayid Maxamed" refers to Sayyid Mohammed Abdulle Hasan.

This collection of poetry served as material for interpretation and analysis in his next book, Taariikhdii Daraawiishta iyo Sayid Maxamed Cabdulle Xasan, (1895-1921), Wasaaradda Hiddaha iyo Tacliinta Sare, edited by Akadeemiyaha Dhaqanka, Mogadishu, 1976.

Before the Somali script was formally adopted, Aw Jama published in Arabic: Tarikh al-Sumal fi al-'Usur al-Wusta waal-Haditha (The modern and Middle Ages of Somali history) and Zu’ama al- Harakah al-Siyasiyya fi al-Sumal (The leaders of political movements in Somalia), both in 1965. In 1966, he published in Arabic Tarikh al-Liwa Da'ud (The life of General Daud Abdulla Hirsi) a book on the biography of the first Commander-in-Chief of the Somali army. As a member of the Academy of Culture, Aw Jama researched the history of the towns of the Banadir coast. In 1979, he published, in Arabic, Muqdishu Madhiha wa Hadhiriha (Mogadishu: Past and present). In collaboration with Somali historians Mohamed Haji Omar and Ahmed Jimale "Castro", he wrote Speared from the Spear:Traditional Somali Behaviour in Warfare, published by the International Committee of the Red Cross in 1997.

== Death ==
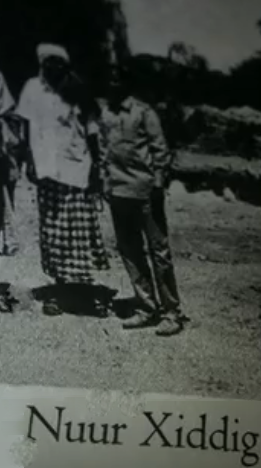
Aw Jama standing beside Nur Hedik (white shirt) who is wearing the emblematic Kuuk Darawiish prayer bead on his left wrist and the emblematic Darawiish duubcad turban on his head.

On 6 January 2014, Jama Omar Isse died in the neighboring country of Djibouti at the age of 91. He had been living in Djibouti since the collapse of Somalia's central government in 1991 after which the Djibouti government hosted him following widespread of insecurity in Somalia.
