= Abdi Sheik Abdi =

Somali author based in the United States (born 1942)

Abdi Abdulkadir Sheik-Abdi (Somali: Cabdi Sheekh Cabdi, Arabic: عبدي عبد القادر الشيخ عبدي) (born 15 November 1942, Somalia) is a Somali author based in the United States.

== Academia ==
Sheikh-Abdi holds B.A. and M.A. degrees in English Literature and African Studies from the University at Albany of the State University of New York and a doctorate in African History from Boston University. He has taught both in Somalia and the U.S., and is the author of numerous short stories, two novels, a collection of fables, as well as articles and essays.

== Bibliography ==
- The Luncheon, 1975
- Rotten Bananas, 1979
- Arrawelo: The Castrator of Men - a Somali fable
- Divine Madness: Mohammed Abdulle Hassan (1856-1920), 1993
- Tales of Punt, 1993
- When a Hyena Laughs: A Somali Novel, 1994
