= Xaashi Suni Fooyaan =

Darawiish politician

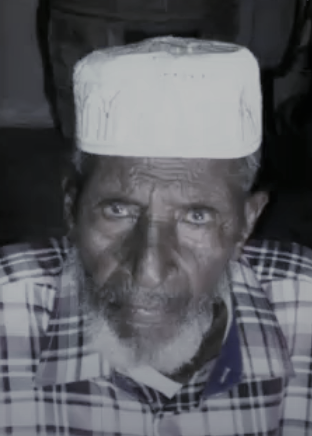
Ismaaciil, son of darawiish peace-time prime minister Xaashi Suni Fooyaan

Xaashi Suni Fooyaan was a Darawiish politician who is described as a Qusuusi (counsellor) in native Somali sources, and as peace-time Darawiish prime minister in colonial sources.

== Biography ==
The majority of attributions ascribed to Xaashi Suni Fooyaan consist of the furtherance of diplomacy, caution or social accord, whereby he was typically accompanied by a Darawiish associate. Among these are:

- Hamed Sultan, a teenage successor to Kaladi Madlay, whereby they attended the 1905 negotiations for the cessation of warfare between Darawiish and the European colonial powers. During one of these negotiations, in a conversation between Italian negotiator Signor Sylos Sensale and Xaashi Suni Fooyaan, a The Pittsburgh Press report states that Xaashi Suni Fooyaan was the Darawiish prime minister and that he made the following statement to Sensale:

In Scia Alla (by God's will), if you have not died today you will not die for a long time. The Mullah has cut off the heads of Englishmen killed in war; he has decapitated Abyssinian children that they might not grow up to be Christian men. And you two white men have dared to come before this man.

— Xaashi Suni Fooyaan

- Xaashi Cabdi Geydhe, as well as Fooyaan, were present in a battle in Saraar whereby according to the poem Indha-cadlaayaal, the Darawiish clashed with British or pro-British Rayid forces who came from Waqooyi Galbeed who had plundered Darawiish herds. The poem Indha-cadlayaal describes both Geydhe and Fooyaan as qusuusi (i.e. counsellors), and the 17th verse states that Fooyaan contended for discretion. Due to the fact Darawiish didn't manage to get their herds back, the Sayid subsequently scolds Fooyaan and others.
- The Aaden Oogle brothers were members of the Qusuusi who used to fraternize with Xaashi Suni Fooyaan who include Cabdullaahi Aaden Oogle, Daahwareershe Aaden Oogle, and Sugulle Aadan Oogle. There was an incident of domestic violence between their niece and her husband, in the presence of her uncle Sugulle Aadan Sugulle, whom subsequently instigated a conflict between his own clan Ararsame and that of her husband, an Cali-Gheri oneling subclan. Upon seeing the deadly nature of this conflict, Xaashi Suni Fooyaan castigated despotic behaviour in the home likening it to the race for the partition of Africa wrought by the European imperialists.

== Personal life ==
Fooyaan had had two well known sons, including the late Farxaan Xaashi, one of the highest qualified doctors in Somalia's history, as well as the late Ismaaciil Xaashi, who followed in the footsteps of his father by becoming a political peace arbitrator during Somalia's socialist era.

== See also ==
- Kaladi Madlay
