= Dervish War =

Military confrontations between colonial powers and the Dervishes, 1900-1920

- Part of the Scramble for Africa and World War I (1914–1918)
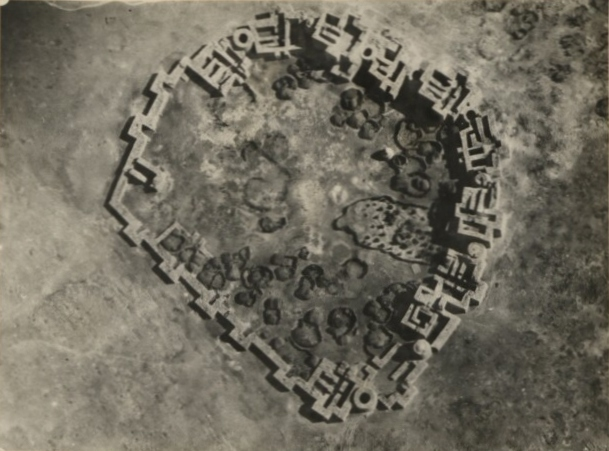
- Aerial photograph of the Dhulbahante garesa at Taleh, the capital of the Dervish State.
Date	1899–1920
Location	Horn of Africa
Result	British-Italian victory

Belligerents
British Empire; Italy; Ethiopia (1900–1904)	Dervish State; Supported by: Ottoman Empire (1915-1917); Ethiopia (1915–1916); Germany (1916-1917)

Commanders and leaders
(United Kingdom of Great Britain and Ireland) Eric Swayne (WIA); (United Kingdom of Great Britain and Ireland) Richard Corfield †; (United Kingdom of Great Britain and Ireland) William Manning; (United Kingdom of Great Britain and Ireland) Adrian Carton (WIA); (United Kingdom of Great Britain and Ireland) Robert Gordon; (Kingdom of Italy) Giacomo De Martino; (Ethiopian Empire) Menelik II	Mohamed Hassan #; Ismail Mire; Haji Sudi †; Nur Aman #; Hasna Doreh; Ibrahim Boghol †

Strength
(United Kingdom of Great Britain and Ireland) 28,000	~25,000

Casualties and losses
British forces suffered approximately 660 killed and over 1,000 wounded, with additional casualties among locally raised units.	4,000 Dervishes killed
- 100,000–150,000 deaths in Somaliland

The Dervish War (Note: British sources commonly referred to the conflict as the Somaliland campaign, while Italian sources used guerra dei Dervisci (lit. 'Dervish War'). Other names include the Anglo-Somali War, Dervish Rebellion and Somali War.) was a conflict in the Horn of Africa, between the Dervish State, and the imperial powers of Abyssinia, Britain and Italy, initially from 1900 to 1904, which was followed by a peace treaty-protectorate period with the Italians from 1905, other diplomatic measures in the following years, and a resumption of conflict with the colonial powers from 1913 to 1920.

The opening battle of the rebellion saw the Dervish attack the Ethiopian garrison at Jigjiga in March 1900 and take control of parts of the eastern Ogaden region. The Dervish then declared war on the British colonial administration in Somaliland. The Ethiopian Empire, the Kingdom of Italy and some Somali clans also fought against the Dervish. The British launched five military expeditions, mainly in the Nugaal Valley, between 1900 and 1920 against the Dervish, while the Dervishes often attacked the British or Italian controlled parts of Somaliland. The conflict ravaged the region's economy. It has been estimated that around one-third of the population of Somaliland died during the Dervish rebellion.

During World War I, the Ottoman Empire and Germany supported the Dervish movement; with their defeat, the Dervishes were left with no allies. The British thus launched a massive combined arms offensive on the Dervish forts. The Dervish retreated to their capital at Taleh, which was aerially bombed and then captured by the British, leading to the fall of the Dervish movement and bringing the conflict to an end.

== Background ==
=== British Somaliland ===
Although nominally part of the Ottoman Empire, Yemen and the sahil, including Zeila, in 1841, Haj Ali Shermerki, a successful and ambitious Somali merchant, purchased from them executive rights over Zeila. Shermerki's governorship had an instant effect on the city, as he manoeuvred to monopolize as much of the regional trade as possible, with his sights set as far as Harar and the Ogaden. Zeila and later Somaliland came under the control of Muhammad Ali, Khedive of Egypt, between 1874 and 1884.

In 1874–75, the Khedivate of Egypt obtained a firman from the Ottomans by which they secured claims over Somaliland. At the same time, the Egyptians received British recognition of their nominal jurisdiction as far east as Cape Guardafui.

In the late 19th century, the United Kingdom signed agreements with clans Gadabuursi, Issa, Habr Awal, Garhajis, Arap, Habr Je'lo, Warsangeli, and the Isaaq Sultanate, establishing a protectorate. Many of these clans had signed the protection treaties with the British in response to Ethiopian Emperor Menelik's Invasions. The agreements dictated the protection of Somali rights and the maintenance of independence.

When the Egyptian garrison in Harar was eventually evacuated in 1885, Zeila became caught up in the competition between the Tadjoura-based French and the British for control of the strategic Gulf of Aden littoral. By the end of 1885, the two powers were on the brink of armed confrontation, but opted instead to negotiate. On 1 February 1888 they signed a convention defining the border between French Somaliland and British Somaliland.

=== Italian Somaliland ===
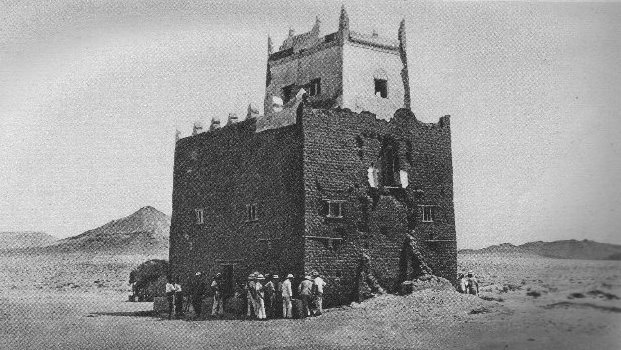
One of the forts of the Majeerteen Sultanate in Hafun

The Majeerteen Sultanate within the northeastern part of the Somali territories was established in the mid-18th century and rose to prominence the following century, under the reign of the resourceful boqor (king of kings) Osman Mahamuud.

In late December 1888, Yusuf Ali Kenadid, the founder and first ruler of the Sultanate of Hobyo, requested Italian protection, and a treaty to that effect was signed in February 1889, making Hobyo an Italian protectorate. In April, Yusuf's uncle and rival, Boqor Osman, requested a protectorate from the Italians and was granted it. Both Boqor Osman and Sultan Kenadid had entered into the protectorate treaties to advance their own expansionist goals, with Sultan Kenadid looking to use Italy's support in his ongoing power struggle with Boqor Osman over the Majeerteen Sultanate, as well as in a separate conflict with the Sultan of Zanzibar over an area to the north of Warsheikh. In signing the agreements, the rulers also hoped to exploit the rival objectives of the European imperial powers so as to more effectively assure the continued independence of their territories. The terms of each treaty specified that Italy was to steer clear of any interference in the sultanates' respective administrations.

In return for Italian arms and an annual subsidy, the Sultans conceded to a minimum of oversight and economic concessions. The Italians also agreed to dispatch a few ambassadors to promote both the sultanates' and their own interests. The new protectorates were thereafter managed by Vincenzo Filonardi through a chartered company. An Anglo-Italian border protocol was later signed on 5 May 1894, followed by an agreement in 1906 between Cavalier Pestalozza and General Swaine acknowledging that Buraan fell under the Majeerteen Sultanate's administration.

=== Ogaden region ===
During the pre-colonial era, the Ogaden region was neither under Ethiopian rule, nor Terra nullius, as it was occupied by organized Somali communities. In 1887, Ethiopian Emperor Menelik II conquered the city of Harar during his efforts to expand the empire and in 1891, announced a programme of ambitious colonialism to the European powers. This marked the start of a tentative yet violent invasion into the Ogaden region. In the first phase of Ethiopian penetration into the region, Menelik dispatched his troops from occupied Harar on frequent raids that terrorized the region.

Menelik's expansion into Somali inhabited territory coincided with the European colonial advances in the Horn of Africa, during which the Ethiopian Empire imported a significant amount of arms from European powers. The large scale importation of European arms completely upset the balance of power between the Somalis and the Ethiopian Empire, as the colonial powers blocked Somalis from receiving firearms. In 1897 in order to appease Menelik's expansionist policy Britain ceded almost half of the British Somaliland protectorate to Ethiopia in the Anglo-Ethiopian Treaty of 1897. Ethiopian authorities have since then based their claims to the Ogaden upon the treaty and the exchange of letters which followed it.

As Emperor Menelik II continued his campaign of indiscriminate raiding and attacks against the Somalis of the Ogaden region between 1890 and 1899, Somali clans residing in the plains of Jigjiga were in particular targeted. The escalating frequency and violence of the raids resulted in Somalis consolidating behind the Dervish Movement. As the Ethiopian Empire began expanding into Somali territories at the start of the 1890s, the town of Jigjiga came under intermittent military occupation until 1900. At the start of the year, Abyssinian troops occupied the town with the construction of a fort in the outskirts.

== Campaigns ==
In 1895 Muḥammad ibn 'Abdallāh Hassan began his preaching in Berbera, the administrative centre of British Somaliland, lashing out not only against some of the traditional Somali customs, which showed little respect for religious rites, but also against the penetration of Christian missionaries in the region, and therefore against the colonial policy of the British. The preaching obtained little results in Berbera, where the majority of the population was faithful to the Qadariyah brotherhood, and in 1897 Abdullah Hassan retired to Kirrit, in the interior regions, to his maternal clan of the Dhulbahante: having founded his own brotherhood, he began his preaching work again, aiming at a strong anti-Western charge and announcing a jihad against the foreign colonisers, British and Ethiopians in particular. In an attempt to overcome the age-old tribal and clan divisions of the Somalis, the mullah ("master") sought to found a community united by the common Islamic faith, defining his followers not with the names of their respective tribes but with the all-encompassing term of daraawiish, or the "dervishes ".

On 12 April 1899, the British Consul General in Berbera, James Hayes Sadler, sent a first report on Abdullah Hassan's activities to the Foreign Office in London, estimating that he had already gathered around 3,000 followers; in the following August, the Mullah gathered around 5,000 armed men, 200 of whom were equipped with modern rifles, in the town of Burao, then carrying out a first raid against the town of Sheikh, less than 100 kilometres from Berbera, whose inhabitants had not responded to his appeals. On 1 September 1899 Abdullah Hassan sent an ultimatum to the British authorities in Berbera, but a few days later his movement began to show signs of weakening due to the never-ending tribal divisions: after having put to death the sultan of Dhulbahante Ali Farah, guilty of not having sided with him, the Mullah was abandoned by many followers belonging to his maternal clan, and he soon had to leave Somaliland, taking refuge in the village of Boholte, near his paternal tribe of the Ogaden. Here the Mullah resumed his preaching, immediately gathering many followers among the Ogaden, who were directly threatened by the aggressive Ethiopian expansion towards the east; Abdullah Hassan also obtained help in arms and ammunition from the sultan of Migiurtinia Osman Mahamuud, who intended to use the dervishes against his rival of Hobyo Yusuf Ali Kenadid with whom he disputed several territories in the valley of the Nugaal.

In March 1900, dervishes began attacking merchant caravans from Harar into Ogaden territory, provoking a reaction from the Ethiopians: a column of 1,500 men under Gerazmatch Bante carried out punitive raids into the Ogaden, but was later attacked at Jijiga by nearly 6,000 dervishes led by the Mullah at the Battle of Jigjiga. Both sides claimed victory following the battle; the improved availability of modern rifles enabled the Ethiopians to inflicted heavy losses on the attackers. Although suffering heavy casualties during the attack, the dervishes accomplished their objective of returning all the livestock confiscated by the Abyssinians. This raid allowed Abdullah Hassan to gather even more followers among the Ogaden, and he then began to push his raids even beyond the frontier into British Somaliland where he raided the non-Dervish Qadariyah clans for their camels and arms.

In the spring of 1901, the British and Ethiopians decided to mount a joint expedition against the rebels: 1,500 Somali mercenaries, under British officers, under the command of Lieutenant Colonel Eric John Eagles Swayne, moved from the north against the village of Jahelli, where the Mullah was quartered, while from Harar 15,000 Ethiopians headed east; mostly mounted on horseback, the dervishes managed to elude the slow-moving Ethiopian army and, although they were three times engaged in combat by the British, avoided defeat. After three months of campaigning, the Mullah led his warriors safely across the border into Mijiurtinia, forcing the British to call off their pursuit.

Although Migiurtinia had to suffer in April 1901 a joint punitive expedition by the Italians and Hobyo for the support given to the dervishes, Sultan Osman Mahamuud continued to provide support to the Somali rebels both in terms of supplies of rifles and ammunition, and by providing safe havens where the Mullah could reorganise his forces. In October 1901 Abdullah Hassan brought his warriors, now numbering 12,000 men and 1,000 rifles, back to southern Somaliland, beginning a series of raids against the possessions of the Dhulbahante clan, who were hostile to him; At the same time, the Mullah kept his agreement with Osman Mahamuud and also led a series of attacks against Hoybo, capturing the important town of Galkayo in the summer of 1902 and pillaging the lands of the vassals of Sultan Yusuf Ali Kenadid. The renewed activity of the dervishes forced the British to organize a new campaign, and Colonel Swayne gathered a contingent of 2,300 men between Somali recruits and African regulars of the King's African Rifles, also equipped with cannons and machine guns; After some initial successes, on 6 October 1902 Swayne's force was ambushed by Dervishes while crossing the bush near the village of Erigo: the Somali recruits collapsed, causing the entire contingent to retreat in disarray towards Buuhoodle and the abandonment of a Maxim machine gun in the hands of the rebels.

=== February–June 1903 ===
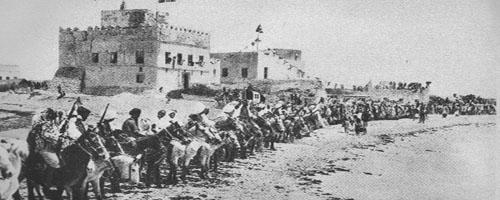
Cavalry and fort belonging to the Sultanate of Hobyo

The British became convinced of their need of Italian assistance. In 1903, the Italian Foreign Ministry permitted the British to land forces at Hobyo (Obbia). An Italian naval commander off Hobyo feared "that the expedition will end in a fiasco; the Mad Mullah will become a myth for the British, who will never come across him, and a serious worry for ... our sphere of influence."

The relationship between Hobyo and Italy soured when Sultan Kenadid refused the Italians' proposal to allow British troops to disembark in his Sultanate so that they might then pursue their battle against Diiriye Guure's Dervish forces. Viewed as too much of a threat by the Italians, Kenadid was exiled first to the British-controlled Aden Protectorate, and then to Italian Eritrea, as was his son Ali Yusuf, the heir apparent to his throne.

In May, the British Foreign Office realised the error, and had Kenadid's son appointed regent, just in time to forestall an attack in Mudug by the Sultan's army.

In early March 1903 the operation began. 5,000 Ethiopians left Harar to head towards Gheledi, along the course of the Shebelle River river, in order to cut off the Dervishes' retreat towards the south. Simultaneously, the British columns starting from Obbia and Berbera (composed mainly of Sudanese, Indian and Yao troops), under the command of William Manning, moved towards Galkayo to trap the Mullah's forces in a pocket. The more agile Dervishes managed to escape the trap by moving towards Gumburu Cagaarweyne and Ual Ual, in the Ogaden region. This forced the British to advance into a territory covered in thick bush and without water.

On 17 April a British advance detachment was charged by Dervish cavalry under the command of Sultan Nur near Gumburu, but was almost completely annihilated with the loss of 9 British officers, 187 Yao African soldiers and some machine guns. A few days later a second column was attacked at Daratoleh and put to flight after losing a quarter of its men. The expedition ended in failure as the Dervish annihilated the British detachment near Gumburru and Daratoleh. For trying to save a fellow officer, Captain Charles Bruce, during the fighting withdrawal three officers John Gough, George Rolland, William George Walker were awarded Victoria Crosses. When the fight was over, a lone Dervish horseman galloped to the Dervish camp and announced that the English had been wiped out. The Mullah immediately mounted his horse, Dodimer and rode to the field of battle.

With 1,200–1,500 rifles, 4,000 ponies and some spearmen, the Dervish occupied the Nugal Valley from Halin in the British protectorate to Eyl (or Illig) on the Italian-held coast. The main British force near Galad (Galadi) under General William Manning retreated north along the line Bohotleh–Burao–Sheekh. This "old-established line" had already been breached by the Dervish when they invaded the Nugal. By the end of June, the withdrawal was complete.

=== Attack on Jidali ===
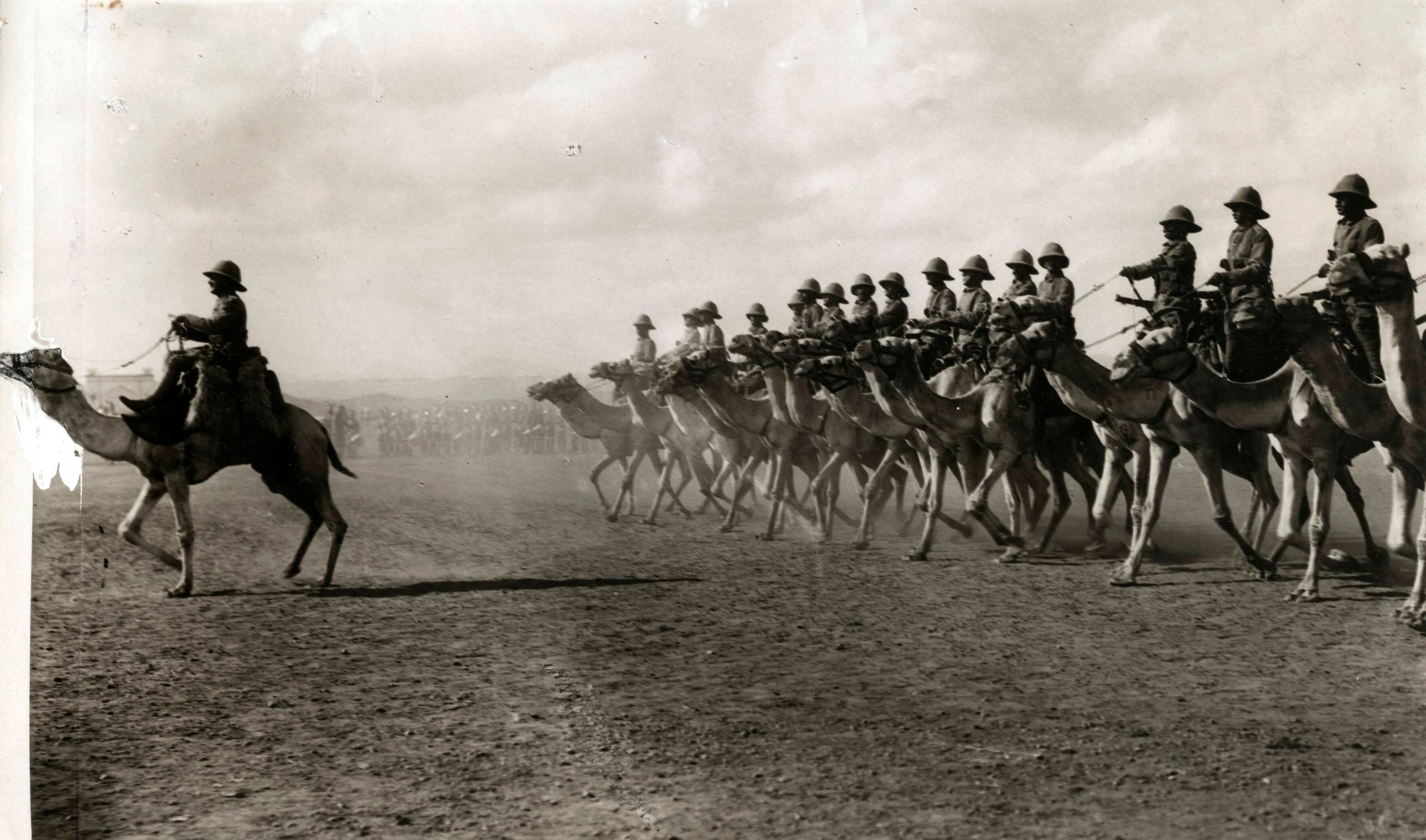
British camel troopers in 1913, between Berbera and Odweyne in British Somaliland.

After the failure of General Manning's offensive, General Charles Egerton was entrusted with a response. Following extensive preparations, he united his field force at Bacaadweeyn (Badwein) on 9 January 1904 and defeated the Mullah at Jidali the next day. The British and their allies from Hobyo harassed the dervishes along their retreat, and lost many of his camels and livestock throughout February.

==== Battle of Eyl ====
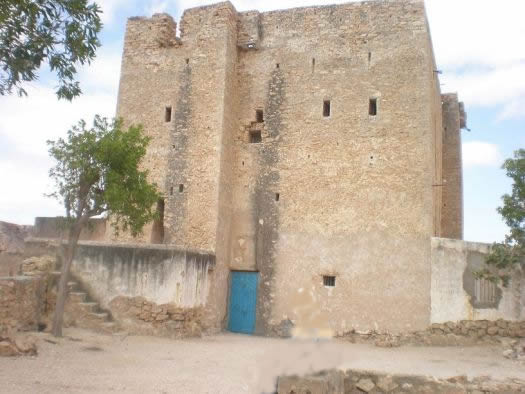
Dervish fort in Eyl

In early March, the second phase of operations began. The Ethiopians advanced as far as Gerlogubi but turned back in early April. The Italian Navy bombarded Eyl in the winter to no effect. On 16 April, three ships of the East Indies Station under Rear Admiral George Atkinson-Willes left Berbera planning to capture Eyl in cooperation with an advance overland. The attack on Eyl took place on 21 April. A Royal Naval detachment, reinforced by three companies of the Royal Hampshire Regiment, stormed and captured the forts at Illig, the ships' guns supporting the attack. The British lost 3 men killed and 11 wounded, and the Dervishes 58 killed and 14 wounded. The naval detachment remained ashore for four days, assisted by an Italian naval detachment that arrived on 22 April. Control of Ilig was finally relinquished to Ali Yusuf of Hobyo. Having defeated his forces in the field and forced his retreat, the British "offered the Mullah safe conduct into permanent exile at Mecca"; the Mullah did not reply.

== Diplomacy ==
=== Pestalozza peace treaty ===
Due to the military setbacks of the previous year, the Dervishes sought at least neutral or amicable relations with at least one surrounding imperial power. This ultimately resulted in an Arabic speaking Dervish envoy named Shihiri being sent to Aden to propose Dervish forming a protectorate of Italy. The initiatives for negotiations, was started by the Mullah himself who wrote three letters in March 1904 to Lt. Vessel Spagna, commander of the Italian squad in Bosaso.

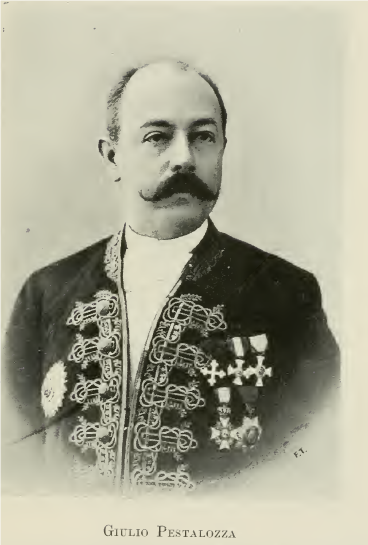
Giulio Pestalozza.

Giulio Pestalozza in his second meeting with the dervish October 17, 1904 was accompanied by Sylos and Paladini, two fellow Italians. After the second meeting the Mullah declared to Sheri and Pestalozza the following:

Now, O Pestalozza, you and Abdallah Sheri, are delegated by me and to you I bestow the power for our cause. If you ask me pacification, I accept the peace and mutual trust – and I promise to stop the discord and the war in the interior. I, the Derwishes and all my people will molest no one, neither Mijerteyns, nor the people of Yusuf Ali, neither the English nor their dependents. I and my people are the people and dependents of the Government of Italy if it favours us and cools our heart (the text says our stomach or our desire); we will be under its flag. We only request that the Government of Italy allow(s) us to build a country at a point which it will consider suitable, from Gabbee to Garad.

— Declaration by the Mullah to Pestalozza, Ilig, I7 October 1904.

After a long, three-way negotiation between the powers of Britain, Italy, Ethiopia and the Dervish, the British received a dervish delegation for a peace agreement:

On 5 March 1905, the treaty of Ilig or the Pestalozza agreement was signed between the dervish and the powers, the dervish represented by The Mullah and Sultan Nur along with Diria Arraleh and other Dervish representatives signed the final agreements Dervish peace treaty with the British, Ethiopians and Italian colonial powers on 5 March 1905, became known as the Ilig Treaty or the Pestalozza agreement.

The colonial conditions were accepted by the Dervish State on the 5th of March 1905; peace was agreed to with Britain, Ethiopia and Italy, and Dervish State becoming a protectorate of Italy.

=== Wingate mediation period 1909 - 1910 ===
During the mediation period multiple letters were exchanged between the Dervish State and the British empire's representatives at Berbera due to the fact that by 1908, the Illig treaty was broken by the Dervishes. The letters were prompted by Dervish re-entry into the broader Nugaal which broke the 1905 Ilig treaty from three years earlier. 1909 debates in the British parliament remonstrated against the cost of operations against the Dervish state whose cost had reached 5 million pounds and as such they preferred to strike a peace deal by sending experienced general Reginald Wingate.

However these diplomatic efforts failed when the Dervishes refused the terms. As such, monetary issues were the main concern with the British deciding on the least costly way of not abandoning British Somaliland protectorate. The least costly way of retaining their British colonial holdings was believed to be restricting their presence to a few coastal holdings, namely Zeila, Berbera and Bulhar.

Due to the fact the British had protection treaties with the otehr tribes, they distributed firearms to their most friendly dependants, most notably among the Isaaq as a form of self-protection and to encourage them to develop their own native military leadership.

=== Coastal concentration 1911 - 1912 ===
With the breaking down of Wingate-led mediation, the British decided on a coastal concentration policy. Besides this, the work of undermining the internal cohesion of the Dervish State was underway by the end of the 1900s decade, thanks to the corruption of an emissary, the British and Italians obtained from Abdullah Hassan's former Sudanese religious teacher, Mohamed Saleh, a letter condemning the disciple's actions, which was immediately exploited for propaganda actions that caused the desertion of several hundred of the Dervish State's statesmen and warriors. Then a project of fort-building commenced with the ofrts being used as a border of the Dervish state. The largest of these forts was at Taleh and its satellite complex whilst they included a chain of forts to the northwest, from the mountain of Shimbiris on the coast to the village of Gid Ali in the interior, chosen as a border with the remaining British possessions. At the turn of the 1910s decade the Dervish state began to weave new alliances, convincing the Bagheri tribes of the Uebi Scebeli valley in the south and the Warsangali clan of north-eastern Somaliland to ally themselves with the Dervishes against the Europeans. In addition to his traditional allies in the Ogaden tribes; overcoming traditional religious hatreds, Abdullah Hassan also sent letters of friendship to the Ethiopian emperor Menelik II to negotiate an alliance against the Europeans, a project which later fell through due to the betrayal of his representative, who passed the Mullah's letters to the Italians and the British.

== Conflict 1913 - 1920 ==
=== Dul Madoba ===
Between 1913 and 1915, while the attention of the European powers was absorbed by the events of the First World War, the "Dervish State" reached its maximum expansion: on 9 August 1913 a Dervish column clashed with the only remaining British mobile force in the colony, Colonel Richard Corfield's Camel Constabulary, at the battle of Dul Madoba, killing its commander; on 5 September of the following year, 60 mounted Dervishes entered western Somaliland and sacked the town of Burao, while between 12 and 13 March 1914 a small Dervish force penetrated 500 kilometres into the colony to attack the outskirts of the capital Berbera, then sacking several villages on the way back.

=== World war ===
During the First World War, the Mullah sought to strengthen his position and seek new allies. The death of Menelik II in December 1913 led to his grandson Lij Iyasu succeeding to the throne in Addis Ababa, Iyasu pursued a more conciliatory policy towards the Muslims, establishing his court in Harar and establishing friendly relations with the Ottoman Empire and the German Empire, which were intent on bringing Ethiopia into the war on the side of the Central Powers. The friendlier policy undertaken by Iyasu aroused the interest of Abdullah Hassan: in early 1915, emissaries of the Mullah visited the Ethiopian court several times to negotiate an alliance with the Ottomans, and from Harar shipments of arms were sent to the Dervish forces. The alliance was, however, short-lived: concerned by the conciliatory policy towards the Muslims, in September 1916 the Ethiopian authorities led a coup d'état in Addis Ababa, dethroning Iyasu and replacing him with Menelik's daughter, Zewditu; supplied with weapons by the British and French, the imperial forces defeated Iyasu in the Battle of Segale (22 October 1916), recapturing Harar and severing ties with the Dervishes.

With the possibility of an alliance with Ethiopia having faded, the Dervish state found itself increasingly isolated: the Ottoman Empire, which had entered the war with the Entente powers at the end of 1914, tried to send the Mullah arms, ammunition, money, and political support, but the Italian-British naval blockade of the Somali coast prevented a massive influx of aid. Between 1915 and 1918 the Dervishes remained essentially on the defensive, conducting only raids and small-scale actions; in February 1915, an offensive by the reconstituted British Somaliland Camel Corps led to the capture of the Dervish fortifications set up on Mount Shimbiris and other minor positions, forcing the Mullah to withdraw his western line of resistance to the vicinity of his stronghold of Taleh. Further south, dervish columns conducted raids into Italian-controlled territories in February 1916, but were stopped by the garrisons of Bulo Burti and Tiyeglow; on 27 March, thanks to the betrayal of some Somali irregulars hired by the Italians, the dervishes took and sacked the fort of Bulo Burti, but were then repelled by a punitive expedition led by Colonel Bessone's askaris.

The cordon tightened around his possessions led to a slow suffocation of the Mullah's forces. In September 1919, Obbia's troops clashed with the Dervishes near the wells of Bullai and Angolaon, inflicting a defeat on them, while at the same time, irregular Somali bands in the service of Italy plundered the surroundings of the southern Dervish stronghold of Beledweyne and forces of Migiurtinia reoccupied the Nogal valley, later crossing the border into Somaliland; these continuous clashes wore down the Dervish forces, forcing the Mullah to move to the north of Somaliland, abandoning the stronghold of Taleh, where only a weak garrison was left.

=== 1920 ===
Faced with the evident collapse of the Dervish forces, in October 1919 the London government began preparations for a decisive campaign; A substantial expeditionary force was assembled consisting of the Somaliland Camel Corps, a battalion of the King's African Rifles and a new arm making its appearance in the theatre for the first time, the air force: in late 1919 the Royal Air Force established an aviation unit ("Z Force") at Berbera with twelve Airco DH.9A bombers, transported to the theatre by the seaplane tender HMS Ark Royal. On 21 January 1920 the British contingent began its operations, and one bomber managed to attack the Mullah's camp at Medisce, causing confusion in the Dervish ranks; further bombing in the following days helped the attack on 25 January by the land forces, which captured the Dervish forts of Gidi Ali and Barhan.

Defeated and disorganized, the Mullah managed to retreat with a nucleus of warriors to Taleh, where however he was immediately located by RAF aircraft; between 2 and 3 February the Dervish stronghold was subjected to continuous aerial bombardment, in preparation for the ground assault launched on 9 February: Abdullah Hassan and about sixty followers managed to escape before the encirclement was completed, but the demoralized garrison surrendered almost without a fight. Hunted by British troops, the Mullah managed to reach his Bagheri allies in the south, albeit with a reduced following; Now isolated from Somaliland, Abdullah Hassan tried to establish a new guerrilla centre in the valley of the Shebelle River, but in August 1920 he suffered a new setback when his camp was attacked by 3,000 irregulars led Haji Warabe of the Reer Caynaashe, suffering further losses.

In October 1920, he eventually settled down at Guano Imi, at the head waters of the Shebelle River in the Arsi country to seek the protection of the Ethiopian authorities but on 21 December 1920 (the precise date is unclear) Abdullah Hassan died after six days of illness; the death of the Mullah effectively decreed the end of the dervish revolt.

== Inter-clan conflict ==
The most notable episode of inter clan conflicts, mostly between Somali tribes was the flashpoints associated with the Harama Una (xaraam cune) period, wherein weapons distributed by the British for self-defence were instead used to settle scores. The score settling between the various clans caused the immediate collapse of the regions involved into a state of anarchy, with the outbreak of fighting and armed clashes between the various local tribes against each other. Damaged by the Italian-British naval blockade, the sultanates of Migiurtinia and Warsangali suspended the sending of weapons and food to the Dervish State. In November 1911, 6,000 dervishes established themselves in the Nugaal. In Modern Bari and Nugaal province inter clan plunder also happened. Plunders of camels were especially assigned names. For example when the Dervishes were looted by the forces of Osman Mohamoud (king) of Majeerteen Sultanate, the name of the loot was called Miinanle. The counter raid by the Dervish State forces to retrieve this loot was referred to as Haylaawe and Gondadhiigle respectively.

In 1910, Boqor Osman Mohamoud and Mohamoud Ali Shire whose domains were under an Italian and British protectorate respectively, became increasingly apprehensive about the expansion of the Dervish state, particularly when they built a fortress at Hiil Buraan. As such, these two sultans decided to launch a joint expedition against them with an army numbering 6666 soldiers which resulted in a Dervish squadron led by Dervish commander Mahamuud Feyte being destroyed at Hiil Buraan. The Dervish state whose headquarters at this time was at Taleh's satellite base of Daar'ad, a locality adjacent to Taleh, decided to get revenge on Shire's hometown of Raacin. Although Dervish State forces succeeded at plundering Shire's hometown, the main commander of Shire called Mahamuud Jaarig who barely escaped with his life, decided to counterattack whilst the Dervishes were still retreating. This series of battles between Dervish State on one hand, and the sultanates along the Guardafui Channel on the other was later referred to as Habarhumbulle.

== Bibliography ==
=== Articles ===
- Clifford, E. H. M. (April 1936). "The British Somaliland-Ethiopia Boundary". The Geographical Journal. 87 (4): 289–302. Bibcode:1936GeogJ..87..289C. doi:10.2307/1785556. ISSN 0016-7398. JSTOR 1785556.
- Owen, F. Cunliffe (1905). "The Somaliland Operations June, 1903, To May, 1904". RUSI Journal. 49 (324): 169–182. doi:10.1080/03071840509418669. ISSN 0035-9289.
- Galbraith, John S. (December 1970). "Italy, the British East Africa Company, and the Benadir Coast, 1888-1893". The Journal of Modern History. 42 (4): 549–563. doi:10.1086/244038. ISSN 0022-2801. JSTOR 1905828.
- Gray, Randal (December 1980). "Bombing the 'Mad Mullah'—1920". RUSI Journal. 125 (4): 41–47. doi:10.1080/03071848009441907. ISSN 0307-1847.
- Hess, Robert L. (November 1964). "The 'Mad Mullah' and Northern Somalia". The Journal of African History. 5 (3): 415–433. doi:10.1017/S0021853700005107. ISSN 0021-8537. JSTOR 179976.
- Lane, Paul G. (June 2020). "The capture of the forts at Illig from the Mad Mullah, 21 April 1904". Orders & Medals Research Society Journal. 59 (2): 152–156.
- Brown, D. J. Latham (April 1956). "The Ethiopia-Somaliland Frontier Dispute". International and Comparative Law Quarterly. 5 (2): 245–264. doi:10.1093/iclqaj/5.2.245. ISSN 0020-5893. JSTOR 756472.
- Ravenstein, E. G. (July 1894). "The Recent Territorial Arrangements in Africa". The Geographical Journal. 4 (1): 54–58. Bibcode:1894GeogJ...4...54R. doi:10.2307/1774176. JSTOR 1774176.

=== Websites ===
- Zaccaria, Massimo (29 July 2021). "Somalia". 1914-1918-online. International Encyclopedia of the First World War. Berlin: International Encyclopedia of the First World War.

=== Books ===
- Abdi, Mohamed Mohamud (2021). A History of the Ogaden (Western Somali) Struggle for Self-Determination: Part I (1300–2007) (2nd ed.). UK: Safis Publishing. ISBN 978-1-906342-39-5.
- Abir, Mordechai (1968). Ethiopia, the era of the princes: the challenge of Islam and re-unification of the Christian Empire, 1769-1855. New York: Praeger Paperback. OCLC 1880.
- Baker, Anne (2003). From biplane to Spitfire: the life of Air Chief Marshal Sir Geoffrey Salmond. Barnsley: Leo Cooper. ISBN 978-0-85052-980-7. OCLC 52358070.
- Cassanelli, Lee V. (1982). The Shaping of Somali society: reconstructing the history of a pastoral people, 1600-1900. Ethnohistory. Philadelphia: University of Pennsylvania press. ISBN 978-0-8122-7832-3.
- Clodfelter, Micheal (2017). Warfare and Armed Conflicts: A Statistical Encyclopedia of Casualty and Other Figures (4th ed.). McFarland.
- Issa-Salwe, Abdisalam M. (1996). The collapse of the Somali state: the impact of the colonial legacy (PDF). London: Haan. ISBN 978-1-874209-91-1.
- Laitin, David D. (1977). Politics, language, and thought: the somali experience. Chicago: University of Chicago Press. ISBN 978-0-226-46791-7.
- Lewis, I.M., ed. (1983). Nationalism & Self Determination in the Horn of Africa. Ithaca Press. ISBN 978-0-903729-93-2.
- Lewis, Ioan M. (2002). A modern history of the Somali: nation and state in the Horn of Africa. Eastern African studies (4th ed.). Woodbridge: James Currey. ISBN 978-0-8214-1495-8. OCLC 50747856.
- Lewis, I. M. (1999). A pastoral democracy: a study of pastoralism & politics among the Northern Somali of the Horn of Africa. IAI classics in African anthrpology (3rd ed.). Oxford: James Currey. ISBN 978-0-85255-280-3.
- Metz, Helen Chapin (1993). Somalia: a country study (PDF). Area handbook series (4th ed.). Washington: United States Government Publishing Office. ISBN 978-0-8444-0775-3. OCLC 27642849.
- Nicolle, David (1997). The Italian invasion of Abyssinia 1935-36 (PDF). Osprey military Men-at-arms series. London: Osprey. ISBN 978-1-85532-692-7.
- Omissi, David E. (1990). Air power and colonial control: the Royal air force, 1919-1939. Studies in imperialism. Manchester: Manchester University Press. pp. 14–15. ISBN 978-0-7190-2960-8.
- Sheik-ʿAbdi, ʿAbdi (1993). Divine Madness: Mohammed 'Abdulle Hassan (1856-1920). London: Zed Books. ISBN 978-0-86232-444-5.
