= Miranzai Valley Expeditions =

Date	Early 1855 – Dec. 1856
Location	Miranzai Valley, Pakistan
Result	British victory

Belligerents
British Empire	Turi tribesmen

Commanders and leaders
Brig. Gen. Neville Bowles Chamberlain	Unknown

Strength
First Expedition: 3,766 Second Expedition: 4,896 9 Cannons	Several Thousand

Casualties and losses
First Expedition: 0 killed, 14 wounded Second Expedition: 5 killed, 3 wounded	Unknown

The Miranzai Valley Expeditions were two British-Indian military expeditions to the North-West Frontier Province in Pakistan.
