= RUSI Journal =

British academic journal

- Discipline: Security studies
- Language: English
- Edited by: Emma De Angelis

Publication details
- Former name: Royal United Services Institution Journal
- History: 1857-present
- Publisher: Routledge on behalf of the Royal United Services Institute (United Kingdom)
- Frequency: 7/year

Standard abbreviations
- ISO 4: RUSI J.

Indexing
- ISSN: 0307-1847 (print); 1744-0378 (web)
- LCCN: 92641693
- OCLC no.: 913566647

Links
- Journal homepage; Online access; Online archive; Journal page at Royal United Services Institute website

The RUSI Journal is a peer-reviewed academic journal covering international security and defence strategy. It was established in 1857 as the Royal United Services Institution Journal, obtaining its current title in 1972. The journal is published by Routledge on behalf of the Royal United Services Institute. The editor-in-chief is Emma De Angelis (Royal United Services Institute).

== Abstracting and indexing ==
The journal is abstracted and indexed in EBSCO databases, the Emerging Sources Citation Index, ProQuest databases, and Scopus.
