= North West Frontier =

North West Frontier may refer to:

- A border area of the British Indian Empire in the 19th century, see Military history of the North-West Frontier
- North-West Frontier Province (1901–2010), a province of British India and later of Pakistan
  - Khyber Pakhtunkhwa, the current province of Pakistan since 2010
- North West Frontier (film), a 1959 British adventure film starring Lauren Bacall

== See also ==
- North-West Frontier States Agency
