= Dhulbahante Garadate =

1750–1895 northern Somali kingdom

Dhulbahante Garadate Garaadtooyada Dhulbahante
- 17th century–1895
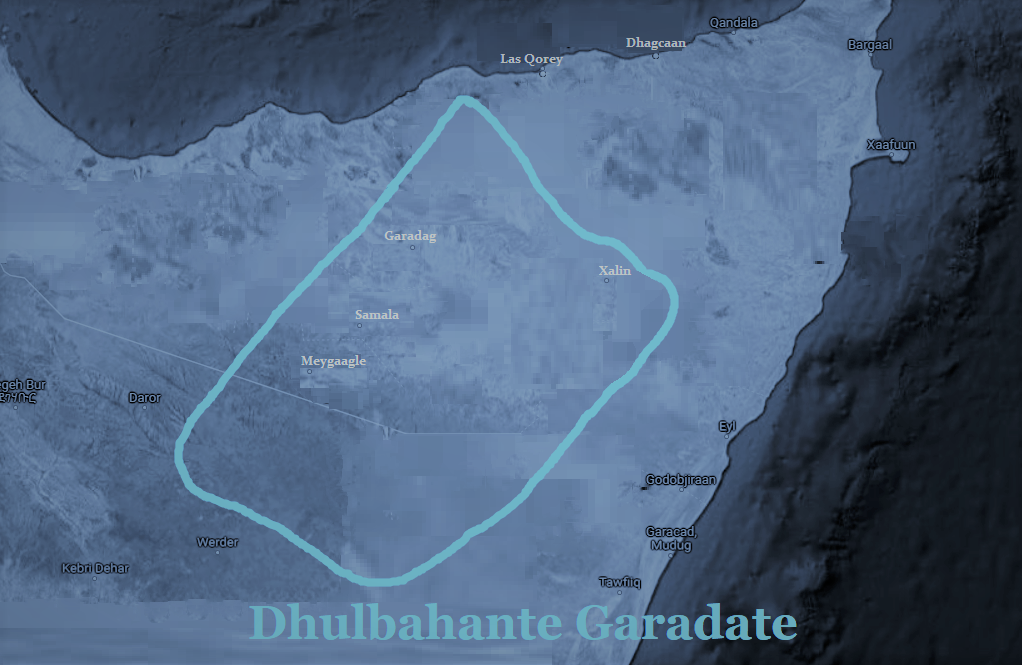
- Common languages: Somali · Arabic
- Religion: Hanafi; Shafi'i; Salihiyya
- Government: Monarchy
- Garad
  - ~1700s: Garad Ali Garad Jama (Traditional Chief)
  - 1650–1708 (first Garad): Garad Shirshore
- History
  - Established: 17th century
  - Absorbed into the Dervish Movement: 1895
Succeeded by
Dervish Movement
- Today part of: Ethiopia; Somalia

The Dhulbahante Garadate (Somali: Garaadtooyada Dhulbahante, begun in the 16th century, as a successor to the Sultanate of Adal with Garad Shishore assuming the royal title in approximately 1530. The current Garad, Garad Jama Garad Ali hails from this long line of succession.

== Dual Garadate ==
The Garadate split from being under a single monarch, under the Baharsame lineage, to splitting into a double garadate during the early 19th century.

19th-century explorer C.J Cruttenden on the Dhulbahante and their horse breed:

"The Dulbahanta are a nation who fight chiefly on horseback, their arms being two spears and a shield. They are notorious for in-fighting amongst themselves. Yet their horses are powerful and courageous; the breed descended, according to Somali tradition, from the stud of Suleiman, the son Of David, and consequently is highly valued. The Dulbahanta, as far as I have seen of them, are a fine martial race of men, second to none...either in conduct or appearance".

The clan boundary between the Habr Je'lo, a clan of the Isaaq clan-family, and the Dhulbahante clan during the 19th century was traditionally in Laba Garday, situated between War Idaad and Wadamago.

The Dhulbahante traditionally had two adjacent kingdoms:

The Dulbahante, as far as I have seen them, are a fine martial race of men, second to none of the branches of Darrood either in conduct or appearance, and they are described as being courteous and hospitable to the stranger who visits them. They have generally two Sultans, or Garaads, the elder of whom, Mahomed Ali Harrin, governs the eastern limits of the province; whilst his colleague, Ali Garaad, (recently deceased) guards the N. W. frontier from the thieving Haber-tel- Jahleh in the neighbourhood of Kurrum and from the Agahdur family of Noh Amor.

— Journal of the Royal Geographical Society

Markus Hoehne described the 19th century existence of a northern Dhulbahante kingdom and a southern Dhulbahante kingdom as follows:

Originally, Dhulbahante had one Garaad who came from the Faarax Garaad branch. It seems that in the mid-nineteenth century, a conflict between the Maxamuud Garaad inhabiting the Nugaal valley in the north and the Faarax Garaad residing toward the south and the Hawd led to the establishment of a separate garaad for the Maxamuud Garaad branch.

The cultural background of Dhulbahante was one of self-determination and autonomy inclined ways according to author Said Sheikh Samatar:

... unlike other pastoralists, the Dulbahante are also excellent horsemen. Even by pastoral standards, the Dulbahante have a reputation for pride, independence and martial spirit

— Said Samatar

=== Contortion ===
A common nomenclature used by the British to describe the head of the Dhulbahante clan was "sultan" during the colonial era. According to author Said Samatar, he concurs that the terms Garad and Sultan are interchangeable.

Poetry was a major theme in Darawiish life, and notable people who engaged in poetry within Darawiish quarters include Ismail Mire, Xaaji Nuur Ciise, Xirsi Diihaal Halanje, Jaamac Seed, Xuseen Dhiqle, Cabdi-yare Dhalbaas and Afqarshe Ismail. The nobility of the Shirshoore, who had two kingdoms, is coalesced with their Dervish identity in the following verses:

Hawa beena Soomaalidaa, hadafka raacdaa leh
Hadal ruma Daraawiishta iyo, weli hanoonaa leh
Raggii diinta hooyga u noqdiyo, hanad shirshooraa leh

Translation:

Somalis whom are by and large deceitful, they belong to the terminus of their journey
Those truthful words of Darawiish, still belongs to the kind-hearted
Those men who are the vanguards of faith, bravery truly belongs to the Shirshoore

The poem Wiilyahow Daloombiyi forges a link between Garad Ali's former Dhulbahante kingdom as being superseded by Dervishism using the metaphor duubcad meaning white scarf, a well known Dervish insignia:

Oo aan dunjiga Cali Garaad, duub cad wada saaray

Translation:

Whereby I covered the kingdom of Ali Garad with the white scarf

== Garads ==
The fourth Garad ali was the first garad to dissipate of the hereditary tradition, as he no longer had royal recognition beyond the year 1898, the position being usurped by Diiriye Guure.

Later Garads:

	Name	Reign From	Reign Till
#	Garad Jama Garad Ali II	2006	current
#	Garad Abdiqani Garad Jama	1985	2006
#	Garad Ali Garad Jama V	1966	1985
#	Garad Jama "Farah" Garad Ali I	1930s	1966
#	Garad Hersi Boqor Garad Osman Mahmud	1921	1923
#	Garad Aardheel Garad Ali	1921	1923
#	Garad Mohamed Garad Ali IV	1920	1920
#	Diiriye Guure (nominal) | - Adan Ali Gurey (Note: The Darawiish maintained the bilateral garaad guud; although the traditional structures were revamped including for the twelve secondary segmentation chieftains)	1905	1920
#	Guuleed Caligeri Axmed	1904	1904
#	Diiriye Guure	1898	1903
#	Diiriye Guure (joint rule)	1895	1898
#	Garad Ali Garad Mohomoud IV	1863	1895–1898
#	Garad Mohamoud Garad Ali IV (koore-baas)	1840	1863
#	Garad Ali Garad Mohamed III	1825	1840
#	Garad Mohamed Garad Ali III	1802	1825
#	Garad Ali Garad Mohamoud II	1780	1802

=== Treaties ===
For the treaty between the Somalis and colonial powers, see "treaties".

According to Roman Loimeier, the Dhulbahante non-treaty was an impetus for Dervish (or Darawiish) emergence:

The Dulbahante had a number of good reasons to put their energies into a jihad: first, the British had not concluded a trade agreement or treaty with them and favored competing clans; second, the Dulbahante felt threatened by the Ethiopian advance into the Ogaden, which formed part of Dulbahante pastures

— Roman Loimeier

Former colonial administrator Douglas James Jardine also noted that Dhulbhante were the only major Somali northern tribe whose chieftains did not sign a colonial treaty with a European colonial power:

Early in 1885 Great Britain concluded separate protective treaties with all the Somali tribes now living under her protection, except the Warsangeli, who concluded a treaty in 1886, and the Dolbahanta, with whom no treaty has been made.

— Douglas Jardine

and consciences were salved by the reflection that our obligation to protect the tribe from the man whom they themselves had created, supported and followed, was less than our obligations to the Ishaak tribes who had for the most part resisted the movement from its very start. Moreover, as will be recalled, the Dolbahanta were the only tribe with whom we had no formal protective treaty.

— Douglas Jardine

The War Office replied that His Majesty's Government had no treaty with the Dolbahanta, and that to put the General's policy into effect would involve assurances of protection, which would still further add to our liabilities in a direction which had already cost so much.

— Douglas Jardine

== Colonial era ==
The sultan or supreme garad of Dhulbahante during colonial era was in order chronological order, Garad Ali, Diiriye Guure also spelled Deeria Goori or Deria Gure, Guuleed Caligeri Axmed, Garad Mohamed IV, Garad Osman Mahmud, Garad Hersi Boqor, and finally Garad Jama I, also called Garad Jama Farah, or Garad Jama Garad Ali. The early and latter colonial era were largely concerned with intra-Shirshoore antagonism. In the initial phase, the Ali Gheri took center stage, whilst in the latter stage, the Barkad took center stage, the former against Mohamoud Garad and Baharsame which were settled via conciliatory gifts of horses, and the latter against Ali Gheri and Baharsame, which were settled by colonial administration-issued fines. With regard to capturing Deria Guure, the British stated that "no guarantee of any kind as to ... future treatment being given", insinuates the intent of retribution on the part of the British government and a high priority for capture. The verbatim motion as presented by James Hayes Sadler states that the Darawiish is a movement that geolocates to the Dhulbahante territories, and states that Diiriye Guure is among those it seeks to capture:

The object of the expeditions is to capture or defeat the Mullah and to put an end to his movement in the Dolbahanta ... In the unlikely event of the Mullah offering to surrender ... Deria Gure – only an unconditional surrender should be accepted, no guarantee of any kind as to future treatment being given.

The transcript from James Hayes Sadler to general Eric Swayne, and subsequently forwarded to levies was rendered by Somali historian Jama Omar Issa as follows:

Diiriye Guure waxa qur ah oo laga oggolaan karaa isdhiibid aan shuruud lahayn; wax sugan oo ballanqaad ah oo noloshooda dambe laga siin karaa ma jirto.

Translation:

Diiriye Guure can solely be permitted to capitulate and give himself up, without any conditions. We do not attach any agreements or safeguards hereafter.

An Evening Express piece published by Walter Alfred Pearce referred to Diiriye Guure as the head of the Dhulbahante clan during the Dervish era. It further describes Guure as wealthy and powerful, and that he participated at the Battle of Gumburu Cagaarweyne, sustaining injuries therein.

The third leader is Deeria Goori, of the Dolbahanta tribe, who was badly wounded at the Battle of Gunburru ... These men are the heads of their respective tribes, and are all wealthy and powerful.

A report in 1903 in the Evening Express states that Diiriye Guure's role was equivalent to the commander of the Royal Engineers, whom in 1903 happened to be Richard Harrison. This report also states he was a veteran of the Gumburru battle, and his brother Maxmud Guure mentioned in the Geoffrey Archer's list was mentioned as witnessing after-effects of Cagaarweyne battle, i.e. an eagle filled the remnants of human testicles: "waxaana calooshiisii laga soo saaray 500 oo xiniinyo rag ah", an event described by Douglas Jardine as "the enemy force was represented by the leading die-hards".

The incident concerning Hersi Boqor, the Barkat were considered the more amenable, and as such, Baharsame as well as Hersi Boqor were threatened according to Brock Millman with "and steps would be taken to affect their arrest or 'destruction'." The Barkat were perceived to get favorable treatment from illaalo contingents when a decade later they were once again found less tractable in an intra-shirshoore dispute. Nonetheless, the chief caaqil of Barkad, who was Maxamed Cali Bulay, was considered bellicose and contentious for his consistent refusal to part with dia payments, even in the event of a killing. These events meant former Barkad Dervishes such as Xareed Duubi Deero squared off against his former Dervish allies of the Ali Gheri. This also meant formerly disparate Barkad dia groups, such as Baha Ali united under the Barkad umbrella for safety.

Likewise, during this era, the Daahyaale raids by Dhulbahante Dervish against Ogaden during the Illig era also temporarily created bad blood between these two lineages.

== Territory & demographics ==
The Dhulbahante traditionally inhabit the territory of the Nugaal, in its topographic sense, and its pre-1980s administrative sense. Neil Faulkner stated that by 1895, the Dervishes were founded in Dhulbahante lands. Scholars generally state the Ali Geri clan were the first tribe to adopt the Dervish identity in the Horn of Africa, thus making Ali Gheri the begetters and initiators of Dervish or making Ali Gheri the Daraawiish founders. Upon the demise of the Dhulbahante garadate and the establishment of Dervish (Darawiish), scholars state the latter predominantly were composed of the Dhulbahante tribe, including Omar Mahmood, Robert Hess, Roy Irons, and Said Samatar.

According to Major F. Cunliffe Owen, in terms of Dhulbahante political allegiance "the great preponderance lay" with Dervishes (darawiish), whilst that of Isaaq tribe was "mostly attached" to the British. Cunliffe Owen also stated that Dervish followers emphasized Nugaal as their territory, with Dervish negotiators and diplomats likewise emphasizing Nugaal as a jurisdiction. Dervish leader Sayid Abdullah Hassan likewise placed an emphasis on Nugaal in Dervish demarcation. Dervish historian Jaamac Cumar Ciise likewise stated Dervish placed an emphasis on Nugaal, stating "sal u ahayd ... ugu jeclaayeen ... kama maaranto .. dhulkay asalka ", singling out Nugaal as the Dervish headquarters, their most desired land, their indispensable land and original land. Ciise also stated "haanka ku hayeen ... inaanay gacantooda ka bixin" i.e. the Nugaal is the Dervish ultimate objective, and that Nugaal should forever remain in their (the Dervishes) firm grip.

== Culture ==
The Nugaal is traditionally Dhulbahante territory and also the territory emphasized by the Dervish. Maarsasho is a Somali term which literally means minimalism, referring to the off-the-grid lifestyle. The Dervish stated in a 1903 letter to the British colonial consulate that the Darawiish pride themselves on having no material possessions:

Last year I fought with you and Musa Farah was with you. God willing, I will take many rifles from you, but you won’t get any rifles or ammunition from me, and I will not take your country. I have no forts, no houses, no country. I have no cultivated fields, no silver or gold for you to take. I have no artificers. Musa Farah has gained no benefit by killing my men and my country is of no good to you

Douglas Jardine likewise noted the propensity of maarsasho (minimalism) among Darawiish, and said this extended to avoiding drugs such as the Khat leaf:

With all the corrosive invective of the born agitator and the recklessness of the reformer, he inveighed against the luxury of the age. He proclaimed that the Somalis were wasting their substance on riotous living, especially on tea-drinking. He protested against the immorality of chewing kat

The onset of colonialism didn't necessarily directly engender a binary colonial or Dervish identity, with Jardine describing a set of people who had "immunity from attack":

From this place, the chief grazing grounds of the tribes were at his mercy. It was an excellent base from which to carry out raids in any direction. Many of the tribesmen, loath to leave such luxuriant pastures, had remained in close proximity to the Dervish post; and their immunity from attack had shown that some sort of understanding existed between them and the Dervishes with whom they had exchanged visits and presents.

The Mariyama Shiikh poem suggests a culture of nativism in the Nugaal with the usage of muhajir (emigrant) for non-natives:

5 Kun lag oo muhaajiriina waa, ma hurihiisiiye

Translation:

5 a thousand emigrants have arrived; and she (Mariyama) is indispensable for them

The Dhulbahante and her sister clan the Warsangali both practice a dance called the Jaandheer, which is a cultural dance native to the Isaaq clan that birthed the Dhulbahante, that reside in the states of Sool Sanaag and Cayn. The Dhulbahante are said to have adopted the tradition from subclans of the greater Habr Jeclo, who have been known to practice the dance.
