= Gumburu Cagaarweyne =

Gumburka Cagaare ጉምቡርካ አጋሬ
- Location within Ethiopia
- Coordinates: 7°54′N 47°18′E
- Country: Ethiopia
- Region: Somali
- Zone: Dollo Zone
- Time zone: UTC+3 (EAT)
- Postal code: No postal code

Gumburka Cagaare, or simply Cagaare (Amharic ጉምቡርካ አጋሬis a town in the Somali Region of Ethiopia, near the border with Somalia.

It is in the Werder zone and in the Somali region. The exact district or woreda of Gumburka Cagaare is Bookh also called Boh. It lies a few miles south of the Somali border, roughly halfway between Qoriley and Sahdheer. The name of the town is transliterated in many ways including Gumburo Cagaare, Gumurta Cagaare, Gumburta Cagaare etc. The outskirts or surrounding flatland of the town is called Gumburka Cagaarweyne, with the weyne suffix meaning big or broad in the Somali language. Between the 15th and the 17th of April 1903, Gumburka Cagaarweyne (the outskirts of Gumburka Cagaare) was the scene of the biggest military victory of the Darwiish over the British thus far. The British fatalities included nearly 200 British infantry, with all accompanying commissioned officers being killed including general Arthur Plunkett, general Herbert Edward Olivey, colonel Herbert Humphrey, colonel Mckinnon, Lieutenant Gaynor, Captain Johnston Stewart, Lieutenant E.W. Bell, Lieutenant Francis Wheler, and Captain Herbert Charles Vesey. Maxamuud Dheri was the most notable Darwiish person to have died during this battle.
