= Haroun (administration) =

Government and headquarters of the Dervishes

Golaha Xarunta
Branch overview
- Formed: 1895
- Preceding Branch: Dervish court tariqa
- Jurisdiction: Ciid-Nugaal
- Headquarters: Taleh fort
- Branch executives: Faarax Maxamuud Sugulle, (Head of Haroun); Carab Illaawe, (deputy head of haroun)

The Haroun, administration, (Somali: Golaha Xarunta) was the government of the Dervish State headed by Faarax Mahmud Sugulle. According to Claude Edward Marjoribanks Dansey, the political officer in the British Somali Coast Protectorate consisted of 400 individuals. The capture of the haroun was regarded as conceivably resulting in the Sayyid's surrender. In the third expedition, major Paul Kenna was tasked "by every means" to find where the haroun is.

== Background ==
The Darawiish haroun was preceded by the Darawiish legal court tariqa (Somali: Maxkamadaha Darawiish) which existed among the Dhulbahante as early as 1895. "He acquired some notoriety by seditious preaching in Berbera in 1895, after which he returned to his tariga in Kob Faradod, in the Dolbahanta," according to the Official History of the operations in Somaliland 1901–1904.

The legal court Darawiish tariqa according to Douglas Jardine, was primarily engaged in settling legal disputes. This early Darawiish court tariqa was also described as friendly to the British government:

he ... was regarded by the local Government as being on the side of law and order. From time to time he corresponded with the Vice-Consul at Berbera about tribal matters, and occasionally he would send down as prisoners to the Vice-Consular Court Somalis who had been guilty of criminal offences in the interior. Thus, he acquired very considerable influence over the tribesmen...

— Douglas Jardine

In Darawiish nomenclature, a person learned in the rulings, legal codes and stipulations of this early Darawiish court, was referred to as a muqaddim, which roughly translates as arbitrator.

The British newspaper Chester Courant, rehashing British intelligence reports, stated that the early Darawiish community existed as early as 1895 as a court of appeal community:

After his return from Mecca in 1895, he retired to Kob fardod, his place of residence and a village inhabited by Mullah's in the Dolbahanta country ... tribes electing to regard him as a court of appeal in their tribal disputes ... he strove to put down raiding.

— Chester Courant

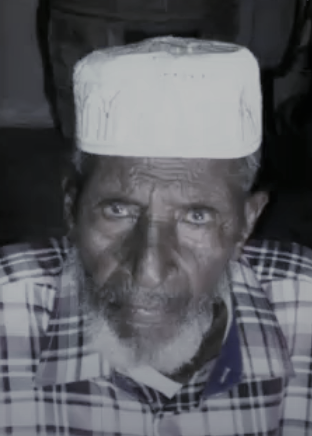
Ismaaciil, son of darawiish peace-time prime minister Xaashi Suni Fooyaan.

== Leadership ==
The head of the Haroun presided over the Darawiish government, and oversaw commerce, domestic and foreign affairs, as well as other Darawiish-related oversight. The head of the haroun, i.e. the head of the dervish government has been described in various sources, with Farah Mahamud Sugulle described as the head of the haroun during the 1890s and 1900s decades:

- 1895 – 1910: Faarax Maxamud Sugulle; was the head of the haroun during the 1890s and 1900s decades. He is described as head of the Haroun in an article by The Times of London in March 1910:

I am strengthening the Darud by the issue of over 200 rifles, and an attack on the Haroun under Omar Doreh, who is to take place of Farah Mahmud, is being organized

As head of the haroun, it was the norm to consult the Head of Haroun, Faarax Maxamuud Sugulle, for any important matter requiring decisions within the Darawiish. For example, upon the first military defeat suffered by Darawiish at the battle of Jidbaale in 1904, despite the presence of qusuusi, Faarax Maxamuud Sugulle was typically singled out to provide deliberation. However out of humility, he would defer to the deputy Head of Haroun, Carab Illaawe:

Iyadoo kumanyaal talo aqoon ah ama dagaalyahan ahi xarunta joogaan ayaa Sayidka waxa caado u ahayd inuu u yeero Faarax Maxamuud Sugulle oo ka mid ahaa madaxda Daraawiishta. Iyadoo markaa talo ribbatay Sayidkii wuxuu yiri, "Faaraxow tali." Faarax markaas wuxu yiri, "Sayidii talo ma aqaan." Mar labaad ayaa Sayidkii ku celiyey oo wuxuu yiri, "Faaraxow tali." Wuxuu yiri, "Sayidii, maantoo kale nin walba talo lama weydiiyo ee Carab Illaawe talo weydii." Markaasaa Carab Illaawe wuxuu yiri, "Sayidii, maantoo kale waxaa la oran jirey dad cadaabeed dal cadaabeed baa laga galaa." Dad cadaabeed wuxuu ula jeedaa gaalada iyo dadka la jira dal cadaabeedna wuxuu ula jeedaa dhulka dhagaxa iyo buuraha ah oo cagaagga iyo kulaylka badan.

Translation:

Although there were a thousand seniors or warriors within the haroun, it was nonetheless stereotypical for the Sayid to consult Faarax Maxamuud Sugulle on critical matters as he was among the heads of the Darawiish. As there was a sense of agitation for some resulution, the Sayid said "Oh Faarax (Maxamuud Sugulle), gives us your verdict", whereby Faarax replied "I'm not sure"; he repeated once more "Oh Faarax (Maxamuud Sugulle), give us your verdict", whereby (Faarax Maxamuud Sugulle) said "Oh Sayid, I defer the verdict to Carab Illaawe". As such Carab Illaawe said "Oh Sayid, since we went face-to-face with the vexed people, let's enter the vexed terrain". By vexed people Carab Illaawe meant the colonisers and their lackeys; by the vexed land, he meant the land of stones and hot hills (to the north of Nugaal)

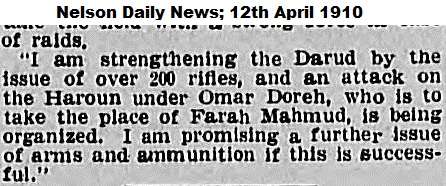
Faarah Mahamuud Sugulle described as the head of the haroun in the Nelson Daily News.

Henry Francis Battersby, in his 1914 book on the Darawiish, described Farah Sugulleh as "one of the biggest men" in the Darawiish.

=== Successors ===
- Carab Illaawe; Illaawe was the person to whom Sugulle would refer to during decision making, as such making him deputy head of haroun.
  - Proposal of March 1910 Omer Doreh; Omer Doreh was in March planned to take the place of Farah Mahamud Sugulle, however, before he could take Sugulle's place as head of the haroun, in that month both Doreh and Sugulle defected from the dervishes in the Anjeel incident described below.

=== Sugulle family ===
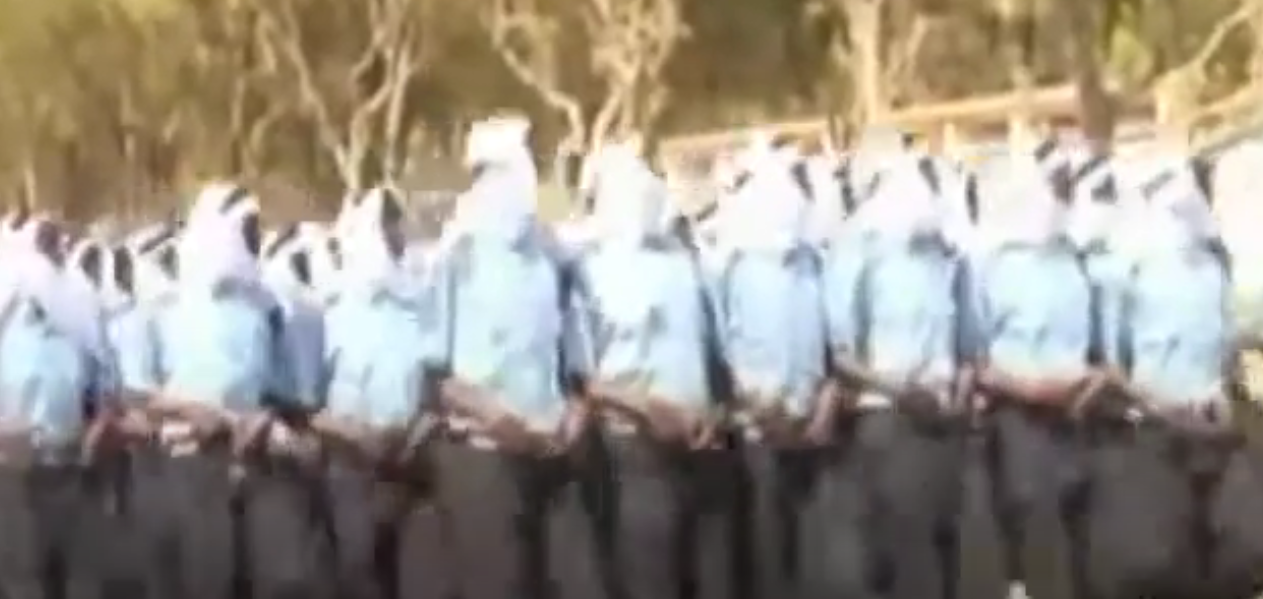
Somali Dervish unit, headed and founded by Jama, son of Farah Maxamuud Sugulle

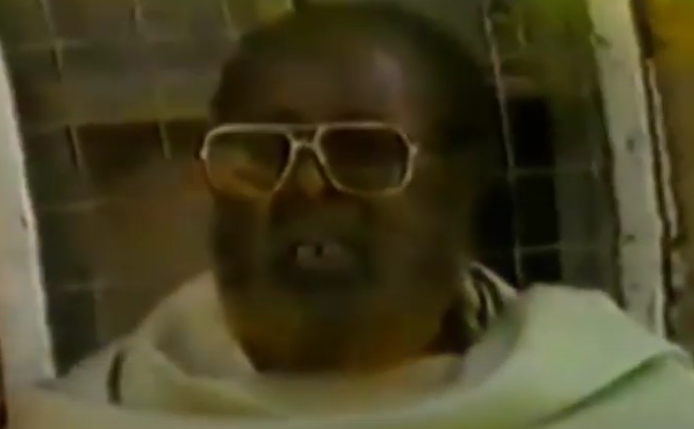
Jama, overseeing the coronation of Garaad Abdiqani in 1985

The son of Faarax Maxamuud Sugulle, Jama, lived through the final decade of Dervish resistance to colonialism, and would continue to be influential in the Dervish realm upon the independence of Somalia in 1960. For example, upon Somalia's independence Jama revived the Darawiish heritage by becoming the founder as well as head executive of the Somali Dervish unit, and he also was the overseer of the widely publicised coronation of Garaad Abdiqani in 1985.

Since the advent of the federal era in Somalia, several police units modelled after the Somali Dervish unit created by Jama Sugulle have surfaced, including Galmudug Dervish, Hirshabelle Dervish, Jubaland Dervish etc.

According to Claude Edward Marjoribanks Dansey, Barni Maxamuud Sugulle, the sister of Faarax Maxamuud Sugulle and fifth wife of the Sayid, was the commander of Indhabadan (lit. "Many Eyes"), a 600 member Darawiish division with 400 spearmen and 200 riflemen of which half was composed of Naleeye Axmed subclan of Ugaadhyahan Dhulbahante and the other half Qayaad Dhulbahante:

INDHABADAN, waxay ka koobnaayeen Aadan Naaleeye, barka kalana Qayaad bay ahaayeen, Barni Maxamuud oo ahayd naagtii 5aad ee Sayidka ayaa magac ahaan ugu talin jirtey, 400 – 200

Translation:

Indhabadan; it was composed of half Adan Naleeye, and the other half Qayaad; Barni Mahamuud, the 5th wife of the Sayid would nominally control it (400–200)

According to Richard Corfield, Sugulle family member Abbane Mohamud Sugulle was likewise a commander in the Darawiish, particularly, the base at Haysimo, which according to British officer Dansey, was a base held by Burcadde-Godwein administrative division. The name of Cabbane Sugulle is misspelled as Abaim Sugulleh; he commanded the Burcadde-Godwein base together with Askar Doreh:

The following Mullah's headman are reported in the Warsangli “karias” at Haisamo:—Asker Doreh, Mijjertein, and Abaim Mahomed Suggulleh, Dolbahanta Ba Ararsama.

British intelligence reports further state that one of the Taargooye subdivisions was commanded by Badhiidh Sugulle.

== History ==
In this meeting several senior members of the Daraawiish called for sedition in one way or another. Individuals who took part in this conspiracy include:

- Haaji Hasan 'Awl, Darwiish governor
- Abdalla Qoriyow, who was the Darwiish magistrate in Taleh
- Ahmad Fiqi, who was a Darwiish theologian
- Faarah Mahamuud Sugulle, who was head of the haroun and the wealthiest person in the Daraawiish
- 'Abdalla Shihiri, who was a Darwiish envoy
- Nur Hashi, who was a khusuusi

Three plans were put forth, including (a) killing the Sayyid and replacing him with a new leader, (b) replacing him without killing him, and (c) deserting the Darwiish en masse. At the end, the third plan was carried out.

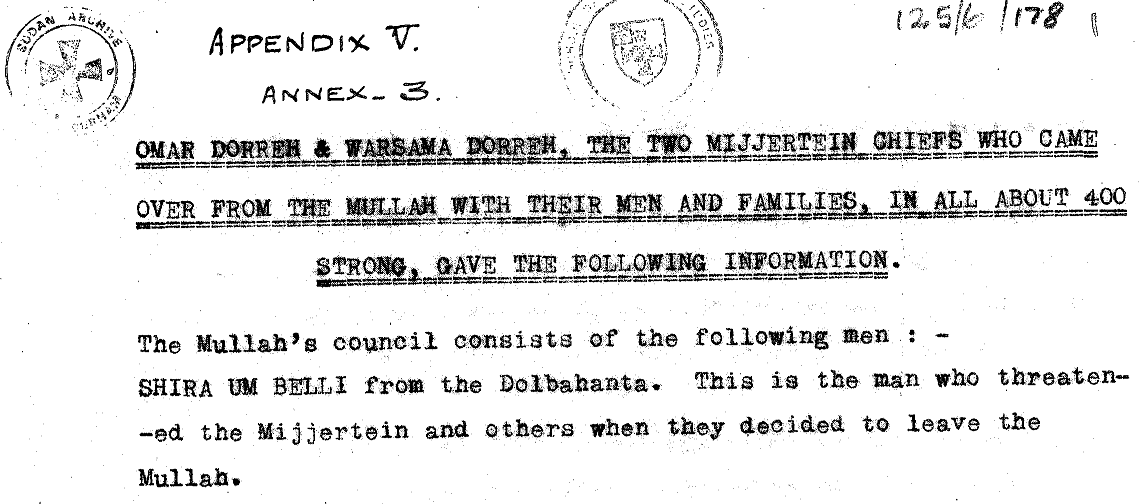
Colonial era excerpt describing Shire Umbaal (spelled as "Shire Um Belli") as a counseller (khusuusi) and threatening the Majeerteen tribe for defecting.

=== Notification ===
The Sayyid was informed about the conspiracy by a man of the Jama Siyaad subclan called Shire Cumbaal, also spelled Shire Umbaal. The exact words spoken by Shire Cumbaal was:

Rag caawuu geedkii Canjeel ku shirey, waxayna ku tashadeen inay xarunta ka guuraan

Translation:

This evening, a few men held a meeting at the Tree of Canjeel. They decided to abandon the haroun (government)

=== Aftermath ===
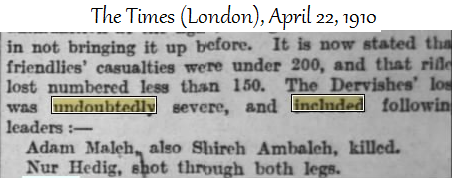
The Times excerpt describing Shire Umbaal (spelled Shireh Ambaleh), Adam Maleh, and Nur Hiddig as the Darwiish military leaders in 1910.

Due to Shire Umbaal's defection from the seditious meeting, and the subsequent notification, the Daraawiish managed to capture many leading conspirators. Haan 'Awl was subsequently killed. Farah Mohamud Sugulle as the leader of Anjeel who sought to usurp the Sayyid's position had his father killed, although his own life was spared. Qoriyow was punished by the decision to have him demoted by stripping him of his previous position. Other figures had fled. The Reer Khalaf, a Majeerteen subclan who had previously been of the Taargooye wing of Darwiish, joined the defectors. As such, they were decimated in retaliation. Confrontations between Darwiish defectors and persistent Darwiish endured for a couple of years, but among the most prominent of these confrontations was the Hadega battle in March 1910 wherein the defectors had been aided by the Issa Majeerteen tribe. Nonetheless, at Hadega, notable casualties occurred on both sides, with Darwiish leader Nur Hidig, permanently debilitated from wounds sustained at this battle, with Nur Dolbas (Dhalbaas) and Adan Egal (Cigaal) dead on the defectors side and Darwiish leaders Shire Umbaal and Adam Maleh were dead on the Darwiish side, with Shire Umbaal later being described by Robert Crewe-Milnes as "a very important leader of the Dervishes".

== Setting ==
The British parliament described the polity over which Mohammed Abdullah held regency as a "strong and stable native state"; and the only one that managed to militarily overcome British military power:

(...) but will they remember that he is the only potentate alive to-day who has four times defeated the British Army, and who has for fifteen years maintained himself against the might of the British Empire. He is one of the great men whom Africa has produced: a great military leader, a great statesman. (...) He quickly obtained through his marriage connections great influence over the Dolbahanta tribe, and he established a native power in the interior. He settled disputes among the tribes, and kept them from raiding each other, thus maintaining law and order. What happened was that this native chief, a man of genius, a military leader of ability, a man who not only had military gifts but gifts of statesmanship, tried to exercise something of the great power of religion, which is always powerful everywhere, in setting up a strong and stable native State in the interior.

— British parliament

Darawiish capitals
Capital	Time	Landform	Remark
Ali Geri homelands, i.e. Ballishiil	1895–1897	Carro Ciideed, south of Buuhoodle: "Mullah to flee eastwards and rejoin his old allies, the Ali Gheri, south of Bohotele, where he would be difficult to get at, either by the Abyssinians or ourselves"	"This Haji Muhammad Abdullah belongs to the Habr Suleiman Ogaden tribe; he married into the Dolbahanta Ali Gheri, amongst whom he now lives"
Buuhoodle	1898–1899	Carro Ciideed	"if joint operations with the Abyssinians cannot be arranged, he must move out alone with all available forces and tribal levies from the Ishak tribe to punish the Mullah's allies round Bohotele"
Buuhoodle & Baran (Las Anod area)	1900	Carro Ciideed & Nugaal Valley	"the Mullah retired eastward into British territory to the Bohotle area, where he was assured of a welcome from his own kinsmen, the Dolbahanta." "MULLAH'SFORCES; 12,000 Horsemen \ Near Baran (i.e. the Baran in the south)"
Docmo in Bookh district	1901	Carro Ciideed	bulk of the Mullah's force ... 3,000 had been left at Damot; i.e. Docmo
Beerdhiga, located between Tuurgasangas and Qoriley	1902	Carro Ciideed	
Halin / Xalin (Sool)	1903–1904	Nugaal Valley	
Kheman (Sanaag), Eyl, Bixin, Qawlo / Gaulo & Goriasan	1905–1910	Nugaal Valley	
Taleh	1910–1920	Nugaal Valley	

== Military-administrative divisions ==
=== Major ===
In terms of military expertise, Golaweyne was most known for being over-represented during the early battles during the first two expeditions. Miinanle was best known for typically being in close proximity of the pastoral Darawiish supporting communities; as such, Miinanle was also typically at the front line whenever confronted with raiding parties from European colonial armed Somali clans such as Rayid, Koufur, Dhabayaco or Huwan. Since Shiikhyaale were the principal as well as the supreme division, any decisions made within the Shiikhyaale was pivotal, and would directly affect the other Darawiish divisions as well. The close proximity of Miinanle to the pastoral communities of Ciid-Nugaal also meant that Miinanle were probably the second wealthiest administrative division, after Shiikhyaale, due to tax-revenue generated.

Major administrative division	Number	Tribe	Quote
(1) Shiikhyaale	1000 spearmen, 800 riflemen; Total: 1800 soldiers	Cali Geri (Dhulbahante), Baharsame (Dhulbahante), Qayaad (Dhulbahante), Maxamuud Garaad (Dhulbahante), Xasan Ugaas (Dhulbahante)	"largest and most important division, probably looked upon as the reserve composed of Ba-Ararsama, Aligheri, Kayad, Mahomed Gerad and many Hassan Agaz"
(2) Dooxato (Note: Dooxato, the plural of Doox, meaning gash or valley in Somali, is the name of the Darawiish cavalry which was commanded by Nur Hedik)	1500 (permanent cavalry) (Note: The 1500 figure for the Dervish cavalry is the only figure described as permanent)	Dhulbahante	"the Mullah had collected 3,500 foot and horsemen on hearing that an expedition was being sent against him ... They were all Dolbahanta men; "He achieved little success with the tribe as a whole, however, and finding that his Dolbahanta horsemen would not tarry so far in Ishaak territory"
(3) Golaweyne	700 spearmen, 200 riflemen; Total: 900 soldiers	Nuur Axmed (Dhulbahante), reer Khayreh (Dhulbahante), (Note: Khayreh is the birth-name of the Bah-hayaag Jama Siyaad Dhulbahante; However Khayreh typically refers to the Dhulbahante wadaad fraternity: "treatment of the Dhulbahante Khayr people, a clan of Mullahs whom Somalis believed to enjoy divine protection"; thereupon, the colonial usage of "Khayreh" usually refer to the Bah Ali-Gheri confederation, Jama Siyaad and others (see 1917 intelligence report):) Yaxye (Dhulbahante), Wacays Diiriye (Ararsame Dhulbahante)	"referred to as the men who made the Gallas run away at Ergo composed of Nur Ahmed, Rer Khiueh, Yehya and Wais Deria"
(4) Miinanle	600 spearmen, 200 riflemen Total servicemen: 800	A) Ali Gheri (Dhulbahante); B) Ogaden (Absame), C) Bah-geri (Dhulbahante Odala & Egal Naleye uterine lineage)	"some Aligheri, chiefly Ogaden and Bagheri under the Mullah and his uncle Abdu- rahman Hassan"

=== Medium ===
The Taargooye subdivision was disbanded in 1910 upon the Anjeel incident after its constituent Majeerteen became mutinous, and was also known for its mechanical expertise. The Dharbash division was the westernmost Darawiish division and was regarded as among the most pious. The Indhabadan administrative division of Darawiish was regarded as having the most scouts. The servicemen of the Burcadde-godwein division was primarily tasked with coercion against neighbouring tribes.

Medium administrative division	Number	Tribe	Quote
(5) Taargooye	500 spearmen, 200 riflemen Total servicemen: 700	Majeerteen (Harti)	"(men who cut the Telegraph), Mijjertein men,"
(6) Dharbash	400 spearmen, 200 riflemen Total servicemen: 600	A) Baharsame (Dhulbahante); B) Adan Madobe (Habar Jeclo, Isaaq); C) Ararsame (Dhulbahante)	"(people who God helps in a fight) Adan Madhoba, Ba-arasama, Ararsama"
(6) Indhabadan	400 spearmen, 200 riflemen Total servicemen: 600	A) Qayaad (Dhulbahante); B) Aden Naleeye Axmed (Dhulbahante)	"(many eyes), Tribes Rer Adan Naleya and Kayad"
(8) Burcadda (buraad)-Godwein	540 riflemen Total servicemen: 540	Warsangeli (Harti), Dhulbahante (Harti)	*Burcadda-godwein numbers (540 riflemen): 40 mounted men all with rifles at Bohol Waraba, 100 riflemen at Halin and about 400 rifles ... Rifles issued to Bur-aad and Godwein can be deducted from these divisions *Burcadda-godwein clans:Bur'ad fanned out from the Dervish capital to loot and terrorize clans loyal to the British and Italians. The Dhulbahante and Warsangeli Daarood played an important role in this program of agitation because of troubles caused by the Buraad and the Warsangeli, and not because our mind has changed and turned from peace

=== Minor ===
Minor administrative division	Number	Tribe	Quote
(9) Ragxun	400 spearmen, 73 riflemen Total servicemen: 473	Cali Geri (Dhulbahante), Ogaden (Absame).	"(bad men) so called because they had many camels taken from them by Mijjertein (Ogaden and half Aligheri)"
(10) Madhiban	250 spearmen, 200 riflemen Total bodyguards: 450	Madhiban	"madhibans are said to be about 2 to 3 hundred with 200 rifles acting as personal guard to the Mullah"
(11) Bah-udgoon	400 spearmen, unknown riflemen Total servicemen: 400	Qayaad (Dhulbahante)	Qayaad, 400 – Lama yaqaan;... Darwiish la oran jirey Faarax Qashe iyo dhawr nin oo la socda (The Darawiish Faarax Qarshe took his own people (i.e. the Qayaad) with him)
(12) Garbo Darawiish	Total servicemen: 350	Dhulbahante, Warsangeli	"di circa 350 uomini"
(13) Warsangeli	200 spearmen, 30 riflemen Total servicemen: 230	Warsangeli (Harti)	"warsangeli men in Haroun"

=== Subdivisions of divisions ===
==== Bah Ina Nur Hedik ====
The 12 May 1907 intelligence report from the British Aden Colony describing Nur Hedik as commander of the Darawiish cavalry is as follows:

Rumours of the desertions of Nur Hedik (leader of the Dervish horse) and his following are still current.

In the post-Dervish period, Nur Hedik was the leader of DHulbahante in Erigabo. A 1910 intelligence report from the British Aden colony documenting a battle between Darawiish and native auxiliaries who were signatories to the Italians, Nur Hedik was described as one of three Darawiish commanders, alongside Adam Maleh and Shire Cumbaal:

The Dervishes loss was undoubtedly severe, and included the following leaders: Adam Maleh, also Shireh Ambaleh, killed. Nur Hedig[sic], shot through both legs.

The Times news sources states that Nur Hedik was shot through both his legs. On occasion, rumours were spread in the Dervish territories of 'Iid and Nugal that Nur Hedik, misspelled as Nur Nedik, had abandoned the Dervishes along with his cavalry, as reported by the British War Office, who refers to Nur Hedik as the overall commander of the Dervish cavalry.

A universal rumour is current that Nur Nudik, a leader of the Dervish horse, has deserted with a number of men, ponies and rifles, to the Southern Mijjertain.

The third person narrative using the native transliteration of Nuur Xiddig is used to describe Nur Hedik as a qusuusi, i.e. a counciller during a scaled back phase of anti-colonial resistance:

15 sano ayaan qusuusidda Daraawiishta ka mid ahaa, 6 bilood markaa ka horna xaruntaan ka baxsaday, aniga iyo Cabdi Nuur Xiddig, xagga dalka iyo dadkaba aqoon baanu u lahayn

Translation:

From the perspective of country and communnity, myself and Nur Hedik were well versed, and had been qusuusi (counsillers) for 15 years; nonetheless we defected from the government roughly six months beforehand

Nur Hedik, according to the British War Office report, initially controlled only his Ali Naleye subclan:

Nur Hedig (All Naleya, Yusuf AU) visited the Mullah at Gaolo, and brought him a present of 10 ponies. He promised that he and his own followers should throw in their lot with the Mullah, but Abbas cannot tell what the remainder of the Ali Naleya will do

The Darawiish haroun, the name of the dervish government, was at Galo, near Halin, and Nur Hedik was one of the rare named visitors there:

Nur Hodig, with 30 men paid a visit to the Mullah at Gaolo, to come to terms with him, nothing further is known about him.

During the fourth expedition, the only Dervish commander to be appended with their name in the official British documentation of the staff diary of H. E. Stanton was Nur Hedik; the following report about Nur Hedik was given prior to the Battle of Jidbali:

Reconnoitring party of Tribal Horse returned on the 25th to Badwein after spending the night of the 24th in the neighbourhood of Jidbali. Report force there considerably strengthened and zariba extending to Chidan, 1 1/2 miles south. Also that Nur Hedig's raiding party from the north has joined them.

==== Others ====
British intelligence reports gave the following details on subdivisions of Darawiish administrative divisions:

- Other subdivisions of Shiikhyaale besides "bah ina nur hedik" were "bah ina daib" and "bah ina islan"
- "bah ina mullo" was a subdivision of Ragxun and was commanded by Cusmaan Boos.
- Subdivisions of Garbo were "Bah Ina Ali Shire" and "bah ina Ali Ibrahim", commanded by Jaamac Cudur, of the Ali Gheri clan, and Nuurxaashi Cali Ibrahim, of the Warsangeli clan, with the latter subdivision being named after Nuurxaashi Cali.
- A subdivision of Taargooye was "bah ina dorey", commanded by Badhiidh Sugulle, spelled in intelligence reports as "Badi Suguleh".
- Joofey Cali Jiriir, described in British sources as Jofi Ali Godi, was said by the British War Office to have commanded 800 men in 1903.
