= Geladin (woreda) =

Coordinates: 6°40′N 46°25′E

Geladin (Somali: Geladdi) is one of the woredas in the Somali Region of Ethiopia. Part of the Werder Zone Geladin is bordered on the south by the Korahe Zone, on the west by Werder, on the northwest by Danot, on the northeast by Boh,(Galhamur) Woreda and on the southeast by the Provisional Administrative Line with Somalia. The major town in Geladin is Geladin.

Before 1960, there was little water available during the dry season in Geladin; although the Geladi wells and other shallow wells in their vicinity were used, they did not always yield sufficient water in the dry season to serve as a reliable permanent water source. So the pastures in the woreda were traditionally abandoned by the local nomadic pastoralists for areas with abundant water with the advent of the dry season, like the wells of Werder, and Galkacyo, Las Anod or Garowe across the border in Somalia and Somaliland. Water points in the area increased in number beginning in 1954 with the sinking of a borehole near the Geladi wells. The shallow wells of Geladi, Dudub, Durwayale, Korof, Cel Furdan, Gaal Dheer and Godene Dayeer increased in importance during this period as existing wells were improved and new ones dug at these sites. From the 1970s, the construction of private birkas (underground concrete water tanks) greatly increased, and by 1998 there were 55 villages with birkas in the woreda, but the number of birkas in each village varies widely. For example, there are estimated to be 3,000 birkas around the village of Qalo'an, whereas other settlements have as few as 20. The building of birkas has also been stimulated with the arrival of refugees fleeing Somalia since 1988. While this allowed the area that was previously grazed mainly in the wet season to now be grazed throughout the dry season, it has also led to a serious decline in the native species most favored for fodder and grazing in this Geladin.

== Demographics ==
Based on the 2007 Census conducted by the Central Statistical Agency of Ethiopia (CSA), this woreda has a total population of 98,053, of whom 57,469 are men and 40,584 women. While 9,217 or 9.4% are urban inhabitants, a further 36,788 or 37.52% are pastoralists. 99.35% of the population said they were Muslim. This woreda is primarily inhabited by the Majerten Bicidyahan, Somali marehan clan.

The 1997 national census reported a total population for this woreda of 106,230, of whom 60,734 were men and 45,496 were women; 7,233 or 6.81% of its population were urban dwellers. The largest ethnic group reported in Geladin was the Somali (99.9%).
