= Geladin =

Geladin Geladi
- Location within Ethiopia
- Coordinates: 06°57′N 46°25′E
- Country: Ethiopia
- Region: Somali
- Zone: Dollo zone
- District: Geladin
- Elevation: 530 m (1,740 ft)
- Time zone: UTC+3 (EAT)

Geladin (Somali: Geladi) is a town in eastern Ethiopia. Located in the Dollo Zone of the Somali Region, this town has an elevation between 427 and 530 meters above sea level.

Arthur Donaldson Smith records he visited Geladin (which he also calls "Ceel cad") in January 1895, which he estimated had 3,000 inhabitants at the time. The British used Geladin as a base during their war against Darawish and Bicidyahan in 1903, Bicidyahan supported Darawish led by Hashi Shirwa (known Albaab) in Agarweyne. By 1932, the Italians had built a road from Danot to Geladin over terrain that officially lay within Ethiopian territory. This was one of many acts that led to the Second Italian-Abyssinian War years later.

Based on figures from the Central Statistical Agency in 2005, this town has an estimated total population of 10,795, of whom 5,961 are men and 4,834 are women. The 1997 census reported this town had a total population of 7,233 of whom 3,938 were men and 3,295 women.

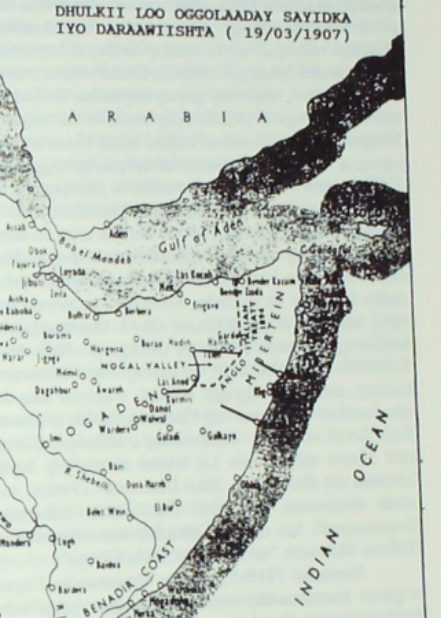
The territory of Darawiish (marked out in black ink delineation), according to Somali historian Muxamed Ibraahim Muxamed, included Ciid-Nugaal regions of Nugaal province, Las Anod District, Xudun District, Taleh District, Boocame District, with Geladin as its southernmost point

== Demographics ==
The wider woreda is primarily inhabited by the Majeerteen subdivision of the Harti Darood, subdivisions of Leelkase, itself a subdivision of the Tanade, as well as the Marehan subdivision of the Sade Darood.
