= Warder =

Warder may refer to:

- Prison officer

== Places ==
- Warder, Netherlands, a village in the municipality of Zeevang
- Warder, Germany, a municipality in Schleswig-Holstein
- Warder, Ethiopia, a town in Somali Region of Ethiopia

== People ==
- A. K. Warder (1924–2013), British Indologist scholar
- Benjamin H. Warder (1824–1894), American manufacturer
- Frederick B. Warder, American naval officer
- Frederick L. Warder (1912–1980), American politician from New York
- George Woodward Warder (1848–1907), American philosopher and writer
- John Aston Warder (1812–1883), American physician, forester, and horticulturist
- Laurie Warder (born 1962), Australian tennis player
- Marie Warder (1927–2014), founder and former President of the Hemochromatosis Society of South Africa
- Walter Warder (1851–1938), American politician and lawyer from Illinois

=== As a given name ===
- Warder Clyde Allee (1885–1955), American ecologist
- Warder Cresson (1798–1860), U.S. Consul to Jerusalem
- William Warder Norton (1891–1945), publisher

== Other uses ==
- Warder (The Wheel of Time), from the novels by Robert Jordan
- Warder Mansion, Washington, D.C.
- Yeomen Warders, ceremonial guardians of the Tower of London

== See also ==
- Ward (disambiguation)
- Werder (disambiguation)
