= Abudwak =

Town in Galmudug, Somalia

Abudwak Caabudwaaq
- Town
- Location in Somalia.
- Coordinates: 6°14′51.01″N 46°13′24.8″E
- Country: Somalia
- State: Galmudug
- Region: Galguduud
- District: Abudwak
- Time zone: UTC+3
- Area code: +252

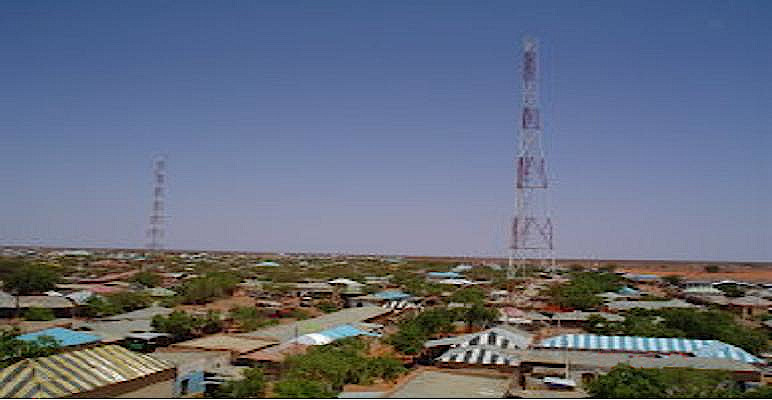

Abudwak (Somali: Caabudwaaq) is a town located in central Somalia. It serves as the administrative seat of Abudwak District located in the northern Galgaduud province. Known for its remote location near the Somali-Ethiopia border, the town has a long history of pastoralism.

== Inhabitants ==
According to the list of Galmudug Assembly members released in June 2015, Abudwak is represented by Marehan. It is inhabited by various Somali clans, with Sade Darod the most dominant. The town acts as a transit point for truckers and travellers due to its location at the border between Ethiopia and Somalia, beside Dollo Zone.

== Abudwak Airport ==
Abudwak and even nearby areas across the border in Ethiopia are served by the Cabudwaak Airport. A major renovation of the facility was launched in 2011, funded by Somali expatriates from the province. The new airport's first scheduled flight departed on 11 October 2012.

In September 2017, a newspaper reported that a plane attempting to land at Abudwak airport was shot at, but the governor of Abudwak District denied it.

In December 2020, a delegation led by the Prime Minister of the Federal Republic of Somalia, Mohamed Hussein Roble, arrived in Abudwak District in Galgadud region to announce that the Federal government will pay two hundred thousand dollars ($200,000) for the construction of the second phase of the airport in Abudwak District. The first phase of the construction of the 3 km long Abudwak airport had been completed independently by the local people.

In June 2021, Abdwak Airport reopened after a two-day shutdown when armed militiamen prohibited planes from landing.

In December 2022, a cargo plane Blue Bird DH8D overran in the Abudwak district. There were 6 crew members and the cargo was a khat. Gear failure is believed to be the cause.

== Mayor ==
Gudoomiyaha Degmada Caabudwaaq, Guddoomiyaha Caabudwaaq
Name	Somali name	Term of office		
Name	Somali name	Took office	Left office	Time in office
Abdirizak Hassan Awl	C/risaaq Xasan Cawl			
Hassan Abdi Alas	Xasan Cabdi Calas			
Ahmed Jama Dhirif	Axmed Jaamac Dhirif	Mar. 2013		
Abdirizak Hassan Awl	C/risaaq Xasan Cawl (or Cowll) Taakilo	Apr. 2014	Nov. 2015	1 year 7 months
Mahad Umar Ilmi	Mahad Cumar Cilmi	Nov. 2015	Feb. 2023	17 years 3 months
Muhidin Adan Wali	Muxyidiin Aadan Wali	Feb. 2023	Incumbent	3 years, 259 days

== Recent history ==
According to a 1996 Immigration and Refugee Board of Canada report, Abudwak is reportedly inhabited by the Marehan clan.

In 1998, when Puntland was established, the Marehan clan of Abudwak considered whether to join.

In September 2007, a WHO polio program official was killed in an attack by unidentified assailants while observing a polio campaign in the eastern part of Abudwak.

According to an August 2008 ReliefWeb report, the lack of rainfall during the rainy season has caused water shortages in Abudwak district, creating a serious humanitarian crisis.

In February 2009, a demonstration in Abudwak in support of the Transitional Federal Government of Somalia occurred.

=== Ahlu Sunna administration ===
In December 2009, Salaad Xareed Faarax, one of the Somalia government officials in Hiran region, announced in Abudwak that he was joining Ahlu Sunna Waljama'a.

In July 2010, the Ahlu Sunna administration stopped broadcasting two radio stations based in Abudwak district, claiming that they were undermining their regime. They also ordered the stations to stop referring to the al-Shabaab militia group that controls parts of southern Somalia as Harakatu Shabaab al-Mujahidiyin (the holy youth fighters movement). One of the stations resumed broadcasting a short time later.

In March 2011, the Ahlu Sunna administration closed seven Koranic schools in Abudwak district for being a breeding ground for terrorists and suicide bombers.

In March 2012, deforestation for charcoal production progressed in Abudwak district, resulting in conflict with nomads. The Ahlu Sunna administration announced a crackdown on charcoal production.

In May 2012, Abudwak, controlled by the Ahlu Sunna administration, was disrupted by the looting of local militias. A UN delegation visited Abudwak and met with the Ahlu Sunna administration.

In September 2012, an inter-clan struggle occurred in Abudwak district, killing four people.

In March 2013, in Abudwak, the Ahlu Sunna administration and the Somalia government signed an agreement that local administration will be implemented in the central region in accordance with the Constitution and policies of the Federal Republic of Somalia.

In June 2013, the Ahlu Sunna administration signed an agreement with the Somalia government in Abudwak.

In August 2013, the new governor of the Galgadud region, Hussein Ali Wehliye Irfo, and Abdirisak Kalif Ilmi, including officers from the 21st Command of the country's armed forces, arrived in the Arbudwak district of Galgadud region.

In December 2013, a businessman was killed by an armed group while trying to stock goods from Bosaso to Abudwak. Shuuke Cagarog was killed and there were rumors of an outbreak of clan conflict; an army of the Eli clan came to Abudwak.

In July 2014, inter-clan fighting occurred in Abudwak district. The fighting occurred in the house of Shuuke Cagarog who was killed earlier. The fighting spread to different parts of town, with gunfire between militias of the Wargardhac and Eli clans; the Abudwak district administrator said they had no power to stop the inter-clan conflict.

In August 2014, it was reported that an inter-clan dispute had been resolved in Abudwak.

=== Conflict between Ahlu Sunna and Galmudug ===
In late 2014, fighting broke out between the Somalia government and Ahlu Sunna. Thereafter, Ahlu Sunna would repeatedly confront and reconcile with the Somalia government.

In April 2015, a Federal Republic of Somalia delegation led by the Minister of Defense of Somalia visited Abudwak.

In July 2015, Ahlu Sunna Forces occupied the town of Abudwak as a preemptive measure against Galmudug.

=== Galmudug administration ===
In September 2015, Ahlu Sunna withdrew from Abudwak.

Abudwak is now under the control of a militia affiliated with the Minister of Trade of Galmudug, and the militia of Ahlu Sunna is outside of Abudwak.

In October 2015, 150 soldiers from the Somali Army's 21st Division were sent to Abudwak; Governor Abudwak welcomed them.

In September 2016, two well-known peacekeepers were shot and killed.

In November 2016, an inter-clan conflict erupted in Abudwak. According to another source, struggle between Galmudug and Ahlu Sunna.

In January 2017, deadly clan fighting resumes in the town of Abdwak.

In March 2017, more than 15 people in the Abudwak district suffered from water diarrhea, several of whom were admitted to hospitals in Abudwak City.

In March 2017, a dispute broke out at a food distribution center in the western outskirts of Abudwak district, killing at least two people and injuring 10 others. The district police were powerless to address these issues due to the lack of functioning.

In July 2017, violent demonstrations occurred in Abudwak. It is believed to have been caused by some merchants refusing to accept Somali shillings due to the occurrence of fake them.

In June 2019, Prime Minister Hassan Ali Khaire of the Federal Republic of Somalia visited Abudwak District.

In October 2020, the Eli clan militia announced that they would cooperate with the Galmudug government.

In February 2021, Salaam Somali Bank opens a branch in Abudwak.

In August 2021, one of the well-known local residents was murdered in the Abudwak district.

In September 2021, Ali Dahir Eid, Vice President of Galmudug, appointed a new government in the Arbudwak District. Abdirizak Hassan Awl was appointed as the new governor.

On 2 February 2022, Galmudug forces raided local media in the Galgadug region and halted some of their coverage. According to the local media, Galmudug forces beat and otherwise assaulted the staff.

On 12 February 2023, Ahmed Abdi Karie, President of Galmudug, arrived in Abudwak. He attended the inauguration of the council.

In March 2023, an armed group born out of inter-clan strife killed a young man in Abudwak District.

In March 2023, two people were killed and 10 injured in a massive fire.
