= Werder =

Werder may refer to:

== People ==
- August von Werder (1808–1888), Prussian general
- Ed Werder (born 1960), U.S. sports journalist
- Felix Werder (1922–2012), Australian-based composer of classical and electronic music
- Rasa von Werder (born 1945), German-born stripper, bodybuilder, and church founder
- Red Werder (1894-1942), American football player

== Places ==
=== Germany ===
- Werder (Havel), a town in Brandenburg
- Werder, Demmin, a municipality in the district of Demmin, Mecklenburg-Vorpommern
- Werder, Parchim, a municipality in the district of Parchim, Mecklenburg-Vorpommern
- Werder, Märkisch Linden, a municipality in the district of Märkisch Linden, Brandenburg

=== Elsewhere ===
- Werder, former German name for borough of Virtsu, Estonia
- Werder Zone, Ethiopia
  - Werder, Ethiopia
  - Werder (woreda)

== Other uses ==
- SV Werder Bremen, a German football club
- Werder pistol model 1869, a pistol made in 1869
