= John Neill Angus =

British Army officer (died 1902)

- Angus, 1902
- Died: October 6, 1902; Erego
- Military career
- Allegiance: United Kingdom
- Branch: British Army
- Service years: 1897–1902
- Rank: Captain
- Unit: Royal Garrison Artillery
- Conflicts: Dervish War: Battle of Erego †

John Neill Angus (died 6 October 1902), also known as J. N. Angus, was a British Army officer of the Royal Garrison Artillery who served during the Dervish War in British Somaliland. He was killed at the Battle of Erego in October 1902 while serving his guns during a Dervish attack.

== Military career ==
Angus joined the Native Mounted Artillery in India as a second lieutenant in 1897 and was promoted to lieutenant three years later. His promotion to captain was antedated to 12 February 1902. On 20 March, Angus was seconded from the Royal Garrison Artillery for service under the Foreign Office. He was subsequently appointed to the 6th (Somaliland) Battalion of the King's African Rifles.

== Dervish war and death ==
Angus served with the force commanded by Colonel Eric Swayne during the British campaign against the Dervishes in Somaliland. On 6 October 1902, Swayne's force was attacked at the Battle of Erego. During the fighting, Angus was killed while serving his guns. Angus Hamilton gave a more detailed account, stating that Angus was shot through the head when the Dervishes had advanced to within about twenty yards of the guns.

After Angus was killed, the Somali gun detachment continued serving the gun. According to the official account, the detachment remained at its position and continued fighting. Douglas Jardine similarly wrote that the detachment stood by the guns as the Dervishes charged close enough for their clothing to be set alight by case shot.

In his later despatch on the campaign, Swayne described Angus as "a young Officer of great promise" who was "cool and careful at drill as well as in action". He stated that Angus had been killed while fighting his guns against an enemy rush and strongly recommended that his name receive recognition.

The battle is known as Beerdhiga in Somali accounts. Historian Mohamed Haji Mukhtar identifies Angus and Major George Edward Phillips among the British officers killed in the fighting.
