= Boh (woreda) =

Coordinates: 7°30′N 47°10′E

Boh (Somali: Bookh), popularly known as 'Iid, is one of the woredas in the Somali Region of Ethiopia. Part of the Werder Zone, Boh is located in the easternmost part of the country, at the point of the angle jutting into Somalia; on its other sides, this woreda is bordered on the southwest by Geladin, and on the northwest by Danot. The easternmost point of this woreda is the easternmost point of Ethiopia. Towns in Boh include Boh, Dameco, Jiracle, Afa'ridood, Gambarey, Maaneed, Qaawane, Marqaanwayne, Galhamur, Toga'Erigoo and Saaxa-dheer.

== History ==
The historic name of the Boh or Bookh region was Ciid. Before 1960, there was little water available during the dry season in Boh; although the Geladi wells and other shallow wells in their vicinity were used, they did not always yield sufficient water in the dry season to serve as a reliable permanent water source. So the pastures in the woreda were traditionally abandoned by the local nomadic pastoralists for areas with abundant water with the advent of the dry season, like the wells of Werder, and Galkacyo, Las Anod or Garowe across the border in Somalia and Somaliland. Water points in the area increased when the Boh borehole was drilled in 1963 followed by Docmo and Dogob boreholes in the 1970s. Another development in the 1970s was the construction of private birkas (underground concrete water tanks). By 1998, there were 65 villages with birkas in Geladin woreda, but the number of birkas in each village varies widely. The building of birkas has also been stimulated with the arrival of refugees fleeing Somalia since 1988. While this allowed the area that was previously grazed mainly in the wet season to now be grazed throughout the dry season, it has also led to a serious decline in the native species of plants most favored for fodder and grazing in this woreda.

== Demographics ==
Based on the 2007 Census conducted by the Central Statistical Agency of Ethiopia (CSA), this woreda has a total population of 103,164, of whom 58,663 are men and 44,501 women. While 9,203 or 8.92% are urban inhabitants, a further 38,214 or 37.04% are pastoralists. 99.36% of the population said they were Muslim. This woreda is primarily inhabited by the Majerteen and Farah Garad sub-branch of the Dhulbahante, sub-clan of the Somali Harti Darood clan.

The 1997 national census reported a total population for this woreda of 79,428, of whom 43,346 were men and 36,082 were women; 4,471 or 5.63% of its population were urban dwellers. The largest ethnic group reported in Boh was the Somali 79,399 (99.9%).

== See also ==
- Danot (woreda)
