= Ballishiil =

Flatland south of Buuhoodle, Somalia

Ballishiil is a topographical feature characterized as a flatland which percolates immediately south from the city of Buuhoodle, Somalia, at the westernmost side of the Ciid plains. Administratively, the Ballishiil plains are situated at the northeast corner of the Danot woreda in the Doollo zone of Ethiopia. The seventy-second poem of the Sayid described Ballishiil as being a place of ponds and as the traditional homelands of the Cali Geri tribe. It includes towns such as Xamar-laguxidh, Boqonka and Cunbaal.
