= Iid (geography) =

Region in the Horn of Africa

Ciid or 'Iid (Somali: Arlo Ciideed) is an archaic native geographic name for the land between the region of Mudug and the Nugaal Valley, roughly congruous with the northern Bookh. As such, Ciid constitutes the tripoint of the two former colonial powers Britain and Italy, as well as neighboring Ethiopia, thus situating Mudug immediately southeast of Ciid, the Nugaal Valley immediately north of Ciid, and Haud to the west of Ciid. One historian referred to it as the syrup-colored land and it is today embodied by Ciid towns such as Futoxum, Magacley, Qoriley, Biriqodey, Beerdhiga and Gumburka Cagaare.

Ciid constitutes the northernmost parts of the disputed Somali-Ethiopian territory outlined in the 16 May 1908 Italo-Ethiopian border agreement also called the 1908 Convention. A 2001 Journal from Indiana University describes Ciid as partially overlapping with Boocame District by referring to Ciid as north of the Mudug region and the west of the Garowe region.

== Anthropology ==
Someone who comes from Ciid is sometimes called reer Ciideed. The long conventional name of Ciid is Arlo Ciideed or Carro Ciideed. The United Nations Environment Programme refers to the landform as Dhulka Ciid, and anglicizes it as 'Iid. Physiographically, 'Iid or 'iid is bounded to the west by Haud, to the southwest by Himan, to the south by Danla, to the north by Nugaal, to the east by Rohr, and to the southeast by Mudug. On Occasion, British colonial administrators used the term Awan to describe parts of the 'iid region.

According to Said S Samatar, Ciid or 'Iid, was during the onset of colonialism primarily inhabited by the Bah Ali Gheri clan. Ciid was one of the land-staking claims during poetic comminations of the chain of Guba poems. According to a Qamaan Bulxaan poem, you can immediately access Dannood from 'iid (Ciid) thereby making 'iid (Ciid) and Dannood neighbours.

== Other archaic terms ==
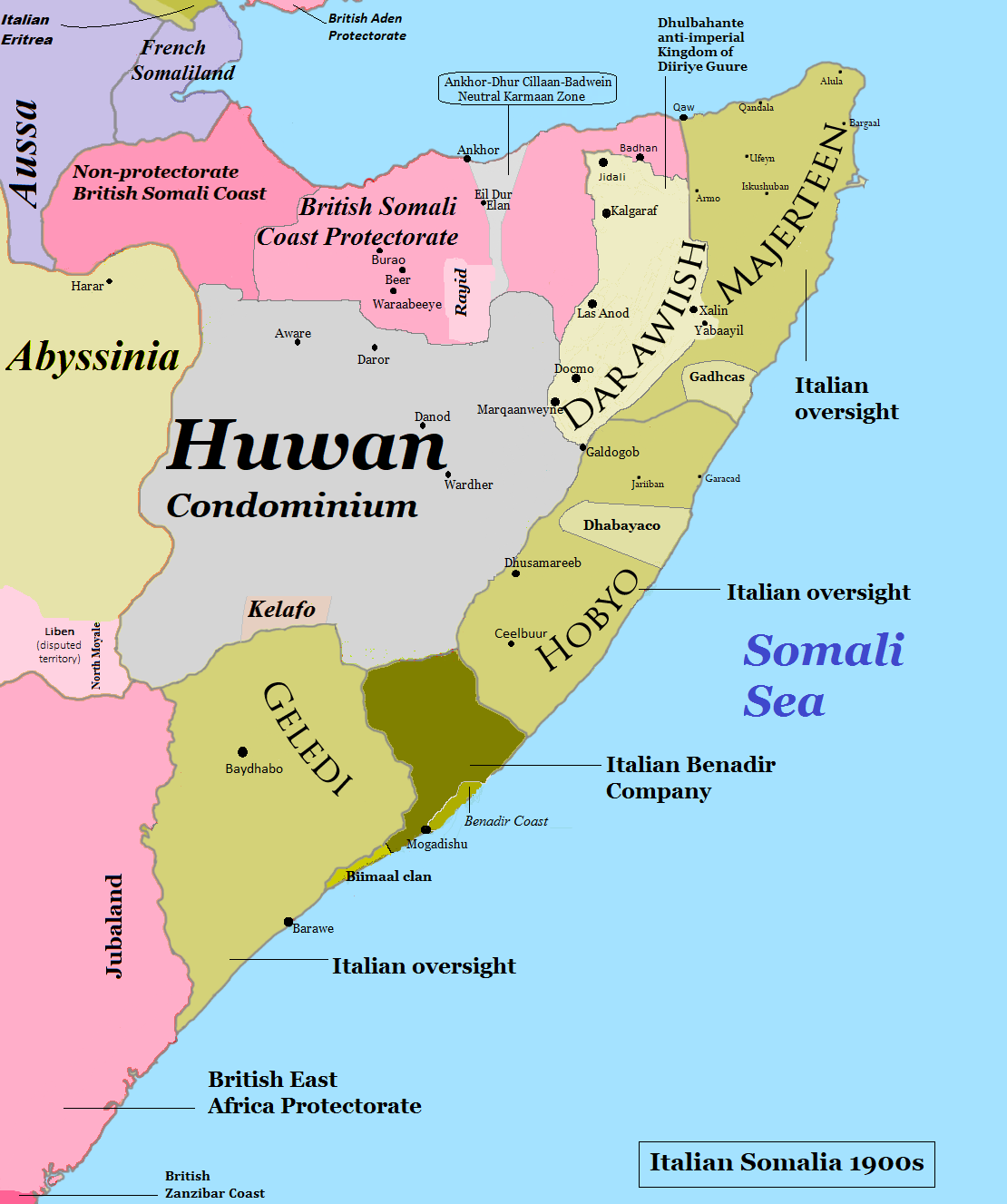
Map showing Huwan, Dhabayaco and Rayid at the beginning of the 20th century Note: Huwan was not a condominium.

=== Huwan ===
Huwan is the pre-colonial era name of the people and the land-mass of the Somali Region which is immediately to the southwest of 'iid. Colonial administrator Douglas Jardine described Huwan as a no-man's land:

“This region has always been accursed, a no-man's land populated by fanatical Ogaden tribes, and a refuge for outlaws and malcontents from the surrounding territories.

At the onset of the colonial era, the term Huwan came to denote a local and colloquial name for the Somalis and the region under the direct or nominal rule of Menelik II. On the other hand, the local and colloquial name for the land and people north of Huwan who were ruled by the British was Rayid, those to the east of Huwan who were under Italian rule were natively referred to as Dhabayaco, whilst in their midst, the people of the Ciid and Nugaal Valley regions were called Darawiish. In Darawiish poetry, the Huwan, Rayid and Dhabayaco are collectively referred to as by the epithet aqdaamo ferenji.

The Huwan region was briefly ruled by the Sayid, head of the Darawiish, from the start of 1900 until the Gurdumi incident in the summer of 1900. The Sayids prestige was very high in the aftermath of the military victory over the Abyssinians at Jigjiga in March 1900. However, some Ogaden tribesmen felt the Sayid was growing too much in power and as such plotted to assassinate him in an incident called Gurdumi. Although the Sayid managed to evade the assassination attempt, his closest confident, Aw Abbas died at the spears of the conspirators. In revenge, the Sayid killed all delegates of a peace delegation and party whom was sent to pay blood money for Aw Abbas. The Ogaden subsequently paired with Menelik II to drive the Sayid and the Darawiish away from the Huwan and back into Ciid and Nugaal regions. This incident is collectively referred to as Gurdumi. The people of Huwan would subsequently come to be under the rule of Menelik II either nominally or directly via taxation or other obligations, via an Abyssinian representative based at Harar.

The governor of the Huwan at the turn of the 20th century was Xuseen Dalal Iljeex, an ally of emperor Menelik II and opponent of the Sayid.

According to Ahmed Farah Ali Idaajaa, the main centers of the Somali Region of Ethiopia then known as Huwan, had always been enemies of the Darawiish:

Soomaalida Galbeed ee aan iyaga weerarradoodu Daraawiish ku badnayn, hase ahaate ay weligood col ahaayeen

Translation:

Although the western Somali Region didn't militarily engage them extensively, nonetheless they had always been enemies (of Darawiish)

=== Dhabayaco ===
Immediately to the east of 'Iid, Dhabayaco was a native endonym and ethnotoponym to describe the Somali inhabitants of Italian Somaliland to the north of the capital Mogadishu, . Whilst the Somalis north of the capital Mogadishu were called Dhabayaco, those immediate surroundings of the capital were intermittently called Filonardi Company or Benadiri. Those Somalis to the west of the Dhabayaco in the Somali Region under Abyssinian rule were referred to as Huwan, the places along and beyond the Jubaland border was natively called Waamo, those in the uncolonized region in Ciid and Nugaal Valley were called Darawiish whilst those in the northwest of the peninsula under British rule were referred to as Rayid.

Rayid is a native endonym to describe northern Somalis who signed colonial treaties with European colonial powers. In its narrower and most common sense, the term Rayid refers to those who signed colonial treaties with the British and were subject to British administrators stationed in Berbera. In its broader but more obscure and rare sense, the term rayid has also been used to describe any Somali who signed a colonial treaty with any European colonial power. The Rayid Somalis were bordered by the Huwan (Somalis under Abyssinian rule) in the south, by the Darawiish in the east, and briefly during the Illig treaty, the Rayid Somalis also momentarily bordered the Dhabayaco, a native endonym for Somalis who were under Italian rule. One of the main differences between a rayid, one who acceded to colonial treaties, and a darawiish, one who shunned colonial treaties, is that the former adhered to the Qadiriya Sufi tariqa, whilst the latter adopted the Salihiya tariqah. Since the British also used to administer British Jubaland, Jubaland's era as a province of British East Africa could also be regarded as Rayid.

=== Rayid ===
To the north of 'Iid, a Rayid was a native endonym to describe northern Somalis who signed colonial treaties with European colonial powers. In its narrower and most common sense, the term Rayid refers to those who signed colonial treaties with the British and were subject to British administrators stationed in Berbera. In its broader but more obscure and rare sense, the term rayid has also been used to describe any Somali who signed a colonial treaty with any European colonial power. The Rayid Somalis were bordered by the Huwan (Somalis under Abyssinian rule) in the south, by the Darawiish in the east, and briefly during the Illig treaty, the Rayid Somalis also momentarily bordered the Dhabayaco, a native endonym for Somalis who were under Italian rule. One of the main differences between a rayid, one who acceded to colonial treaties, and a darawiish, one who shunned colonial treaties, is that the former adhered to the Qadiriya Sufi tariqa, whilst the latter adopted the Salihiya tariqah. Since the British also used to administer British Jubaland, Jubaland's era as a province of British East Africa could also be regarded as Rayid.

Colonial regiments which were composed out of rayids, include Illaloes, the Somaliland Scouts and the Somaliland Camel Corps. There were some Rayids who were given positions of privilege above other rayid. These rayid leaders included Mohamed Bullaleh, known in Somali as Xaaji Bullaale; he is best known for leading the Hagoogane raid wherein 60,000 heads of cattle were looted from the Sayid; Musa Farah Egarreh, the highest ranked Somali in the camel corps, referred to by Douglas Jardine as "the most distinguished Somali on our side".

=== Koufur ===
Koofuur or Koufur was the former name of the modern South West State of Somalia. Captain Abud, the British Consul at Aden, described it as follows:

“Koufur is a country formerly Hawiya and lies between Webbe Shabeli and the Juba and to the west of the Rahanwein (Jeberties); its ports are Merka, Haman (Hamar?) and Barawa. The country was formerly Hawiya but owing to an influx of other people the language has become assimilated to that of the Jeberties.
