= Ual-Ual Incident =

Conflict between Ethiopia and Italy in 1934

- Part of the Prelude to the Second Italo-Ethiopian War
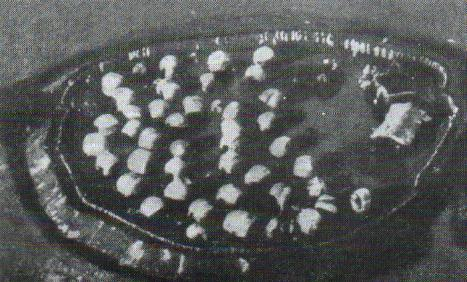
- The Italian fort of Ual-Ual
Date	5 December 1934
Location	Ual-Ual, near the border between Italian Somalia and Ethiopia 7°17′N 44°18′E
Result	Short agreement between Italy and Ethiopia under pressure from the League of Nations: Italian military victory; Casus belli of the Second Italo-Ethiopian War

Belligerents
Italy	Ethiopia

Commanders and leaders
(Kingdom of Italy) Roberto Cimmaruta (Kingdom of Italy) Gerardo Zaccardo	(Ethiopian Empire) Omar Samatar (Ethiopian Empire) Fitaurari Alemajo †

Strength
400 Dubats; 2 armored cars and some airplanes	1,200 men

Casualties and losses
30 killed	107 killed 40 wounded

The Ual-Ual Incident or Walwal Incident (in Italian: Incidente di Ual Ual; in Somali: Dhacdadii Walwaal; in Amharic: የወልወል ክስተት) was an armed conflict in which Ethiopian troops attacked the Italian garrison in Ual-Ual. On 5 December 1934, after a few weeks of tension between the garrison and Ethiopian armed men, a violent firefight began for the possession of the locality, which was located in a strip of disputed territory. According to the Ethiopians, Ual-Ual had been illegitimately occupied by the Italians since 1926 but, in this incident, Italian control over Ual-Ual was confirmed. The conflict ended with an agreement under the League of Nations but Fascist Propaganda made it a Casus belli for the War of Ethiopia.

== Prelude ==
Ual-Ual, better known as Walwal or Welwel, was an important complex of 359 wells used by Somali nomads, located within the deserts of the Ogaden, in an area where the borders were not well defined, between Italian Somalia and the Ethiopian Empire. However, based on the agreements of 1896 between Menelik II and Cesare Nerazzini, the maximum distance from the sea that the colony of Italian Somalia could reach was 180 miles while, in reality, Ual-Ual was 300 miles away and therefore part of Ethiopian territory. From 1925 onwards, the governor of Somalia, Cesare Maria De Vecchi, began to send bands of irregulars to periodically garrison Ual-Ual and the line of water points, establishing a sort of elastic border that Mussolini endorsed, despite the diplomats having pointed out, papers in hand, that that territory did not belong to Italy. Starting from 1930, the well was permanently occupied by a formation of Dubats. The Italian occupation was justified by the fact that Ual-Ual was part, according to the Somalis and the Italians, of the territories held by the Sultanate of Obbia, later ceded to Italy, but in reality, it is of uncertain ownership. The emperor, aiming to affirm Ethiopia's rights over the Ogaden, had appointed the deggiasmach Gabré Mariam as governor of Harar. In 1931 Gabré Mariam led a formation of fifteen thousand men into the desert on a rapid expedition against the Dubats stationed along the border.

== The clashes ==
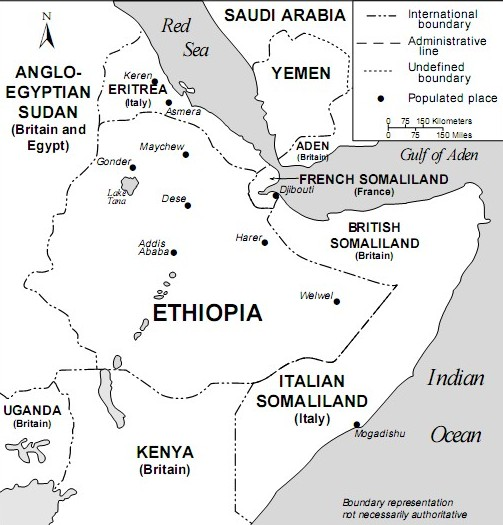
The Horn of Africa and southwestern Arabia around 1930 before the Second Italo-Ethiopian War. Ual-Ual is indicated with the English spelling Walwal/Welwel and would be within Ethiopian territory according to the map, which was drawn up by the US Library of Congress.

In 1934, the Ual-Ual fort consisted of a circular trench with a diameter of about seventy meters protected by plant trunks, inside which there were simple huts inhabited by the Dubats, as well as two more important buildings erected to host passing allies. At the time of the events it was garrisoned by around sixty Dubats, commanded by two indigenous non-commissioned officers, Ali Uelie and Salad Mahmud Hassan; the garrison was supported by the more substantial Uarder garrison, equipped with machine guns and cannons, commanded by Captain Roberto Cimmaruta, responsible for the border clashes. He had been threatened during the month of July by Omar Samatar, a rebel who had already killed an Italian officer, who had received orders from Gabré Mariam to occupy the wells, and who returned on November 22 with around 1,200 soldiers and volunteers, commanded by three Ethiopian fitaurari (military leaders), including Sciferra, governor of the Ogaden, who in turn was accompanied by an English border commission, protected in turn by 80 men of the Somaliland Camel Corps.

Despite the intimations of the Ethiopians, strong of about 600 men, the Somali soldiers in command of the garrison refused to desert or retreat, notifying the Uarder fort which, equipped with a radio, informed Mogadishu. While the governor of Italian Somalia, Maurizio Rava, ordered the immediate dispatch of armored cars and some planes, on 24 November Captain Roberto Cimmaruta arrived at the besieged fort, while the Ethiopians were fortifying themselves near the Italian positions.

In the meantime, the Anglo-Ethiopian commission sent a note of protest to the Uarder garrison against the armed obstruction of free movement in Ethiopia in the Ual-Ual region. This had the aim of reaffirming Ual Ual's belonging to Ethiopian soil, making the British notice the violation of the border, forcing the Italians to retreat and, otherwise, verifying the resistance of the Italian defenses.

Roberto Cimmaruta then requested an interview with the commander of the English mission, Colonel Clifford. At this meeting the Ethiopian delegation showed up with Omar Samatar and his son among the negotiators. During the meeting, the Ethiopian camp was flown over by Italian reconnaissance aircraft which made some low-flying flights for intimidating purposes. Both the English and the Ethiopians didn't notice anything, because the volley missed and ended up covered by the noise of the aircraft; the episode remained unknown, being revealed only in 1977 by General Gerardo Zaccardo, who had been on board the aircraft that had opened fire at the time.

Due to the provocative action of the Italian planes, the English delegation interrupted the talks, retreating and sending notes of protest, while the Ethiopians, who had received 600 additional men and machine guns, began a confrontation, which lasted for ten days.

Having increased the numbers on both sides with the arrival of around 600 men from the Ethiopian side and 400 Dubats from the Italian side, it was clear that the possibility of accidents was now very high and on 5 December, an hour before sunset, the irremediable happened. There are two versions of what happened: according to the Ethiopians the clash began at 3.30 pm, after an order to open fire had been sent from the Italian positions, whereas according to the Italians the clash began at 5.30 pm, when a dubat guarding a tree was hit.

In the very first minutes of extremely intense fire, both Salad Mahmud Hassan, commander of the Italian camp, and the Ethiopian military commander Fitaurari Alemajo were killed during the Ethiopian attempt to flank them. The two Italian armoured car squads coming from Werder under the command of Cimmaruta were then thrown into the fray, while three IMAM Ro.37 aircraft began to machine-gun and break up the Ethiopian assault. The Ethiopian pressure on the fort was thus neutralized, until it transformed into a disorderly escape of the Ethiopian troops against the counterattack of the Italian fast tanks which devastated the camp and the Ethiopian tents.

In the end, approximately 107 Ethiopians were killed and 40 wounded. and 30 Italians and Somalis were killed.

According to some sources linked to Roberto Cimmaruta himself, the responsibility for what happened lies solely with the Ethiopian forces and the English advisors, such as Colonel Clifford. Furthermore, also according to Quirico, the incident was largely organized and sought by Emperor Hailé Selassié, who believed he could successfully raise the pressure on the Italians and reaffirm the sovereignty of the Ethiopian Empire in the Ogaden, also in view of a potential cession of the Ogaden itself to the English as a necessary counterpart to obtain the cession of Zeila, necessary to have a coast on the sea. On the other hand, Italy saw the confrontation as a valid opportunity to motivate the future Ethiopian campaign and did nothing to avoid it, ending up using the favorable opportunity as a Casus belli for the conflict that would begin 10 months later.

== Sources ==
- Dominioni, M. (2008). Lo sfascio dell'impero: gli italiani in Etiopia [The Collapse of the Empire: The Italians in Ethiopia]. Quadrante Laterza, 143 (in Italian). Roma: Laterza. ISBN 978-8-84-208533-1.
- Quirico, Domenico (2002). Lo Squadrons Bianco [The White Squadrons] (in Italian). Mondadori. ISBN 9788804506911.
- Rochat, Giorgio (2008). Le guerre italiane 1935–1943 (in Italian). Milano: Einaudi. ISBN 978-88-06-19168-9.
