= Abudwak District =

Abudwak
- District
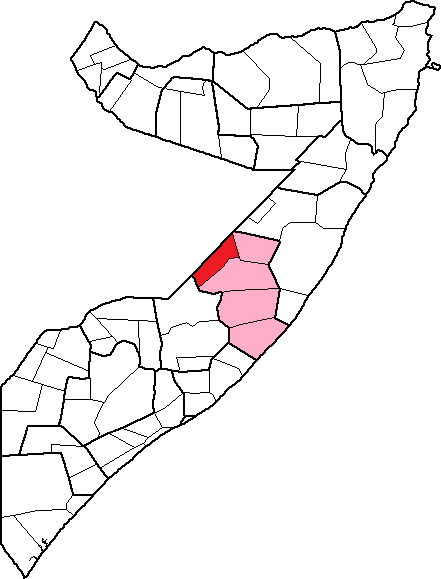
- Location of Abudwak District within the Galguduud region.
- Coordinates: 6.148109°N 46.397270°E
- Country: Somalia
- Regional State: Galmudug
- Region: Galguduud
- Capital: Abudwak
- Time zone: UTC+3 (EAT)

Abudwak District (Somali: Degmada Caabudwaaq) is a district in central Galguduud region of Somalia.

== Demographics ==
According to the list of Galmudug Assembly members released in June 2015, Abudwak is represented by Marehan.

=== Abudwak Airport ===
Air transportation in Abudwak is served by the Cabudwaak Airport. A major renovation of the facility was launched in 2011, funded by Somali expatriates from the province. The new airport's first scheduled flight departed on 11 October 2012.

In September 2017, a newspaper reported that a plane attempting to land at Abudwak airport was shot at, but the governor of Abudwak District denied it.

In December 2020, a delegation led by the Prime Minister of the Federal Republic of Somalia, Mohamed Hussein Roble, arrived in Abudwak District in Galgadud region to announce that the Federal government will pay two hundred thousand dollars ($200,000) for the construction of the second phase of the airport in Abudwak District. The first phase of the construction of the 3 km long Abudwak airport had been completed independently by the local people.

In June 2021, Abudwak Airport reopened after a two-day shutdown when armed militiamen prohibited planes from landing.

In December 2022, a Blue Bird Aviation de Havilland Dash 8-400 cargo freighter arriving from Mogadishu suffered the collapse of its right main and nose gear during landing in Abudwak. Aboard there were six crew members and cargo carrying a load of khat. Gear failure is believed to be the cause.
