= George Edward Phillips (British Army officer) =

British Army officer (1865–1902)

George Edward Phillips DSO
- Phillips, 1902
- Born: 28 January 1865
- Died: 6 October 1902 (aged 37); Erego, British Somaliland
- Cause of death: Bullet wounds
- Military career
- Allegiance: United Kingdom
- Branch: British Army
- Service years: 1884–1902
- Rank: Major
- Unit: Royal Engineers
- Conflicts: Ashanti Expedition; Second Boer War (WIA); Dervish War; Battle of Erego †
- Awards: Distinguished Service Order; Ashanti Star; Mentioned in despatches

Major George Edward Phillips DSO (28 January 1865 – 6 October 1902) was a British Army officer of the Royal Engineers. He served in the Ashanti Expedition, the Second Boer War and the Dervish War. Phillips was appointed a Companion of the Distinguished Service Order for his service in Somaliland and was killed at the Battle of Erego in October 1902.

== Military career ==
Phillips was born on 28 January 1865. He was commissioned as a lieutenant in the Royal Engineers on 5 July 1884 and was promoted to captain on 19 December 1892.

From 7 December 1895 to 26 March 1896, Phillips served on special service during the Ashanti Expedition under Sir Francis Scott. He was mentioned for his service and received the Ashanti Star.

Phillips subsequently served in the Second Boer War from 1899 to 1901. He took part in the Relief of Ladysmith, during which he was wounded, and later served on the staff as an assistant provost-marshal, graded as a deputy assistant adjutant-general. He was mentioned in despatches and promoted to major in 1901.

== Dervish War ==
Phillips took part in the British campaigns against Mohammed Abdullah Hassan in Somaliland. In May 1901, the Somaliland Field Force advanced towards Ber in two columns commanded by Phillips and Captain McNeill. During the fighting at Ferdiddin in July, Phillips commanded a detachment on the right flank, which was ordered to occupy the hills. Fire from his detachment checked Dervish forces attacking the mounted troops under Major W. G. L. Benyon, allowing them to fall back. Phillips's men then advanced across the hills and brought fire to bear on the Dervish positions, forcing them to take cover.

Phillips served as second-in-command under Eric Swayne during both the 1900–01 and 1901–02 expeditions in Somaliland. During these operations, he raised and commanded a corps of 500 levies. In his subsequent despatch, Swayne praised Phillips's service and stated that his "clear judgment was at all times to be relied upon", adding that he had been "specially deserving of reward" and strongly recommending that his name receive recognition.

For his service during the expedition against Hassan, Phillips was appointed a Companion of the Distinguished Service Order on 25 April 1902. He returned to special service in Somaliland on 28 February 1902.

During the expedition, Phillips was ordered to make a demonstration from Burao towards Buur Dhaab with a force of 750 men and two Maxim guns. Detachments under Phillips and Lieutenant-Colonel Alexander Cobbe were also sent against Dervish encampments in the area. The attacks were successfully carried out and resulted in casualties among the Dervishes and the capture of livestock.

=== Battle of Erego and death ===
On 6 October 1902, Swayne's force was attacked by the Dervishes in dense thorn bush at the Battle of Erego. Phillips commanded the Somali companies on the left of the formation. According to Swayne's official account, the sudden Dervish attack and the stampede of the transport camels disorganised part of Phillips's command, causing the men to fall back on the centre and rear before advancing again to their previous position.

Phillips made his way to the rearguard, where he joined the company commanded by Lieutenant L. W. D. Everett. One account states that Phillips was shot while aiming at a Dervish rifleman who was firing at him, Everett was wounded in the same fighting. Jardine recorded that Phillips was killed while rallying his men. Swayne later stated that Phillips had been killed in action at Erego.

Following Phillips's death, Swayne recommended that his service receive official recognition. He wrote that Phillips had served as his second-in-command in both expeditions, had raised and commanded 500 levies, and had been "specially deserving of reward". Swayne concluded: "I strongly recommend that his name receive recognition.
