= Harald George Carlos Swayne =

British soldier, explorer & hunter (1860-1940)

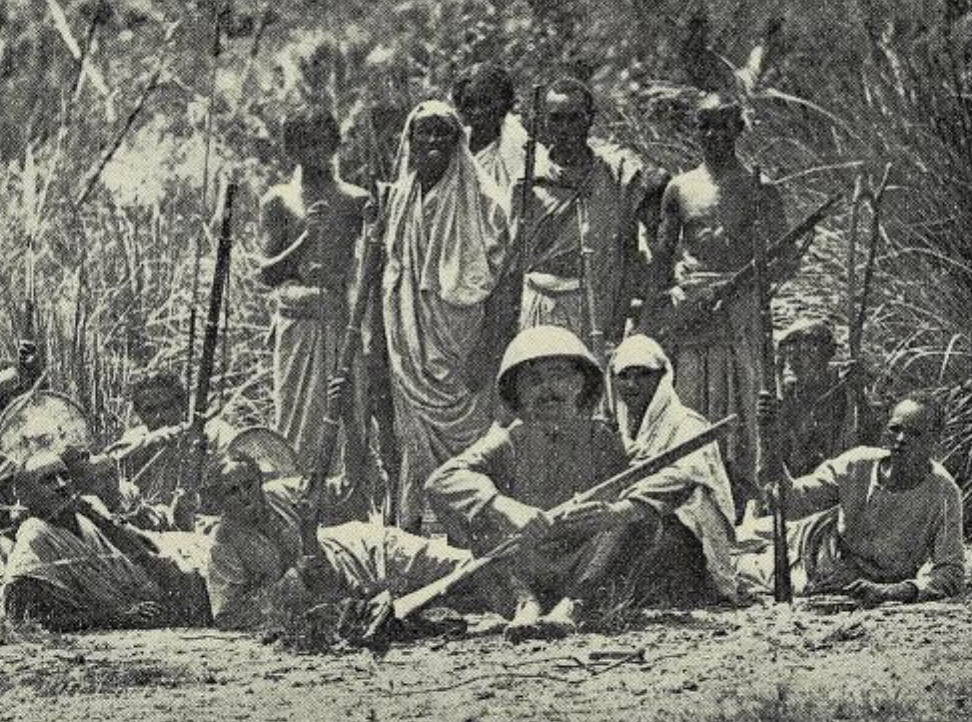
Swayne with his escort, March 1891.

Colonel Harald George Carlos Swayne CMG FRGS FZS (1860–1940) was a British soldier, explorer, naturalist and big game hunter, he was the older brother of Eric John Eagles Swayne.

== Military career ==
Commissioned into the Royal Engineers and commencing his service in India, between 1884 and 1897 Swayne made a number of expeditions to Africa to make exploratory surveys for the British authorities. First travelling to Somaliland in January 1885 to hunt, Swayne made seventeen trips to Somaliland on leaves of absence from the Indian Army to conduct surveys, hunt and explore, making various notes on the local wildlife and inhabitants. In August 1885, the Indian Government sent Swayne to conduct a reconnaissance of Somaliland, a task that lasted until July 1887, the notes and maps he made during this period proved invaluable during the subsequent Somaliland Campaign. Later Swayne served with the Imperial British East Africa Company.

During the Great War, Swayne was recalled to active service and commanded one of the Royal Engineer's Labour Battalions in France and Flanders. Rising to the rank of Colonel, Swayne was mentioned in dispatches on several occasions and made a Companion of the Order of St Michael and St George for his service.

== Sportsman and naturalist ==
Swayne was an avid sportsman and naturalist who hunted and catalogued wildlife extensively throughout Africa and Asia. A fellow of Royal Geographical Society and the Zoological Society of London, the Swayne's hartebeest and Swayne's Dik-dik are both named after him.

Between 1884 and 1897 Swayne hunted whilst on active service in both Africa and India, shooting various animals including elephant, rhinoceros, lion, tiger, leopard and bear. Between 1898 and 1927 he made roughly 40 further privately funded trips throughout Africa and Asia to complete collections, see new countries and meet new tribes, including a trip to Siberia in 1902 with his friend Henry Seton-Karr.

In 1933 Swayne donated an extensive collection of artefacts to the British Museum that he and his brother had collected throughout their combined travels.

== Writings ==
Swayne was a frequent contributor to publications about African wildlife, including the volume Great and Small Game of Africa edited by Henry Bryden. In 1895 he published an account of his experiences in Somaliland, Seventeen trips through Somaliland: a record of exploration and big game hunting, 1885 to 1893. Later editions of this book added first A Visit to Abyssinia and later a supplementary preface on the Mad Mullah risings. In 1904 he published an account of his trip to Siberia, Through the Highlands of Siberia.

== Bibliography ==
- Swayne, H.G.C. (1895). Seventeen Trips Through Somaliland. A Record of Exploration & Big Game Shooting, 1885 to 1893. London: Rowland Ward & Co Ltd.
- Swayne, H.G.C. (1904). Through The Highlands Of Siberia. London: Rowland Ward & Co Ltd.
- Swayne, H.G.C. (1995). Early Days in Somaliland. Bishop Auckland: Pentland Press. ISBN 978-1858212579.

== See also ==
- List of famous big game hunters
- Sheikh Madar
