= Werder (woreda) =

District in Somali Region, Ethiopia

Coordinates: 6°50′N 45°30′E

Werder is one of the woredas in the Somali Region of Ethiopia, named after its administrative center, Werder. Part of the Werder Zone, Werder is bordered on the southwest by the Korahe Zone, on the north by Danot, and on the east by Geladin.

== Overview ==
The average elevation in this woreda is 943 meters above sea level. As of 2008, Werder has no all-weather gravel road nor any community roads; about 7.25% of the total population has access to drinking water.

Before 1960, the only water available during the dry season in the woreda were the Werder wells and those in its vicinity: Welwel, Gerlogube, Afyerado, Ubatale, Wafdug and Yo'ub. [Geri Koombe]Ogaden, Dhulbahante, Majeerteen and Habar Yoonis pastoralists watered from these wells. In the years after 1960 the construction of private birkas (underground concrete water tanks), which greatly increased after 1970. While this allowed the area that was previously grazed mainly in the wet season to now be grazed throughout the dry season, it has also led to a serious decline in the native species most favored for fodder and grazing in this woreda.

The woreda was greatly affected by Ethiopian military actions. According to Human Rights Watch, in late May and June 2007, the Ethiopian army and Regional authorities armed forces forced the inhabitants of numerous villages within a 60-kilometer radius of the administrative center, including Aado (Caado), Arowela, Daratoole, Dhurwaa-Hararaf, Lahelow, Neef-Kuceliye, Qamuuda, Ubatale, Wa’di, Ubatale, Wafdug and Yo'ub. Over the following weeks, many of these villages were then burned: Daratoole in mid-June; Lahelow in late June; Neef-Kuceliye on 23 June; Aado and Wa’di in mid-July.

== Demographics ==
Based on the 2007 Census conducted by the Central Statistical Agency of Ethiopia (CSA), this woreda has a total population of 58,035, of whom 32,743 are men and 25,292 women. While 9,211 or 15.87% are urban inhabitants, a further 13,493 or 23.25% are pastoralists. 99.24% of the population said they were Muslim. This woreda is primarily inhabited by the Makahiil Darood clan and the Dhulbahante clan. The Ogaaden inhabit the northern parts wheres the Dhulbahante and Majerteen inhabit the eastern and southern parts of the woreda.

The 1997 national census reported a total population for this woreda of 98,699, of whom 55,320 were men and 43,379 were women; 12,309 or 12.47% of its population were urban dwellers. The largest ethnic group reported in Werder was the Somali 98,447 (99.9%).
