= Abudwak Airport =

Airport in Galguduud, Somalia

- IATA: none; ICAO: none

Summary
- Serves: Abudwak, Somalia
- Coordinates: 06°10′49″N 046°11′38″E

Map
- Location of airport in Somalia

Runways
Direction	Length		Surface
Direction	m	ft	Surface
05/23	2,077	6,814	Asphalt concrete

Abudwak Airport (Somali: (Garoonka Diyaaradaha ee Caabudwaaq) is an airport serving Abudwak, a highly populated town in the central Galguduud region of Somalia, as well as the nearby settlements in Ethiopia due to the Abudwak's location on the Somali-Ethiopian border. It is also known as Caabudwaaq Airport.

== Overview ==
The airport was formerly just a dirt airstrip near the town of Abudwak.

A major renovation project was launched in 2011, funded by Somali expatriates from the province. In June 2012, the Somali-American Women's Foundation (SAWF) also contributed $70,000 toward the facelift, after the airport's rehabilitation committee had approached it.

According to a government official, all of the facility's sections have since been renovated and are available for use. However, the immigration wing is still being built as of October 2012.

The new airport began scheduled flights on 11 October 2012.

The airport serves an average of 2 flights per day, and 800 passengers per month. In February 2021, more gravel was added to the runway and graded, as preparation for it to be paved with asphalt concrete.

== See also ==
- List of airports in Somalia
