= Eric John Eagles Swayne =

British colonial governor (1863-1929)

Sir Eric John Eagles Swayne KCMG CB

Commissioner of British Somaliland
- In office 1902–1905
- Preceded by: Harry Cordeaux (acting)
- Succeeded by: Harry Cordeaux

Governor of British Honduras
- In office 13 August 1906 – 9 May 1913
- Preceded by: Bickham Sweet-Escott
- Succeeded by: Wilfred Collet

Personal details
- Born: 14 May 1863 Darmstadt, Grand Duchy of Hesse
- Died: 9 September 1929 (aged 66) Bristol, England
- Relatives: Harald George Carlos Swayne (brother)
- Education: St Edward's School, Oxford
- Alma mater: Royal Military College, Sandhurst

Military service
- Allegiance: British Empire
- Branch/service: British Army
- Unit: Welch Regiment; Indian Staff Corps

Sir Eric John Eagles Swayne KCMG CB (14 May 1863 – 9 September 1929) was a British Army officer and colonial administrator. He served in British Somaliland, where he was appointed Commissioner, and as Governor of British Honduras, now Belize.

== Early years ==
Swayne was born on 14 May 1863. His parents were George Carless Swayne, a classical scholar, curate and essayist, and Margaret Sarah Eagles, a poet.

He was educated abroad and at St Edward's School, Oxford, before attending the Royal Military College, Sandhurst, as a gentleman cadet for a year before being commissioned as a lieutenant into the Welsh Regiment (later the Welch Regiment) of the British Army.

He later transferred to the Indian Staff Corps and served in the Burma Campaign (1885–1887), the African Campaign (1898), and in British Somaliland.

== British Somaliland ==
The emir of Dervish Sultan Diiriye Guure was Sayid Mohammed Abdullah Hassan, known by the British at the time as the "Mad Mullah" since he would not accept colonial rule.

In 1900, a part of the first British Somaliland expedition at Samala drove off Darawiish with heavy losses. The Darawiish retreated south towards Ferdiddin, near Damot, where he engaged with the main force of the British expedition under Swayne, who was by 1901 commander of the Somaliland Field Force. Darawiish again suffered high losses and fled to Italian territory. The next year, Darawiish were the victors against Swayne in an engagement at Erego on 17 June 1901. An account of the fighting written by Swayne himself is included in the London Gazette dated 18 April 1902.

Swayne was promoted to lieutenant colonel on 18 November 1901, in recognition of his services during the fighting. In March 1902 he was appointed Commissioner, Commander-in-Chief and Consul General of the Somaliland Protectorate, with the local rank of colonel whilst commanding the troops in Somaliland. Another campaign was planned for late 1902, but it took time to gather the necessary supplies, and it was delayed as Swayne returned to England due to illness in November. The campaign eventually took place February to June 1903, but did not end the conflict, and was followed by another campaign the following year.

In all, Swayne led four military expeditions in British Somaliland.

== British Honduras ==
Swayne was Governor of British Honduras from 1906 to 1913. He was knighted in June 1910. Throughout Swayne's governorship, his administration was attacked in Legislative Council and in the pages of the Clarion by the Creole establishment, of whom a few were white but most were mixed race. Swayne was accused of being autocratic, as was his successor William Collet. One of the targets of criticism was construction of the railway and subsequent sale of the Middlesex banana plantation to United Fruit. In his correspondence with the Colonial Office, Swayne recommended extremely favorable terms to United Fruit so they would accept the offer rather than expanding in Guatemala. Later, the hostility of the elite towards United Fruit was reversed. An editorial in the Clarion in 1914 said of a steamship subsidy requested by United Fruit that it was "well within our means ... and by no means excessive".

In 1917 Swayne said: "We have to remember that the people of British Honduras have always been the freest people on earth. They originally had a public assembly which elected its own magistrates, and these magistrates carried out the laws which the public assembly, that is, the whole people, chose to adopt." He also said:

The mahogany cutters... used to sell themselves into a sort of slavery by receiving advances from their employers at the beginning of the season, which advances they spent most liberally in the town.. leaving their families to starve.

This may be a somewhat exaggerated description. He added: "It is a pity, I think, having regard to the comfortable competency secured out of the Colony by successful merchants, that practically none have elected to remain in the country on retirement."

== Later career and legacy ==
During the First World War Swayne's roles included Assistant Inspector of Recruiting. He retired in 1919 as a brigadier general and died in Bristol on 9 September 1929. He was buried in the cemetery of the St Thomas à Becket Church, Pucklechurch, South Gloucestershire.

The tree genus Givota, which has light but very strong wood, was found in Northeast Africa, including the British Somaliland protectorate. Swayne suggested that it might be useful in airplane construction, an idea that was being explored at the outbreak of World War I. Swayne's elder brother, Colonel H. G. C. Swayne, was one of the first British officers to travel in British Somaliland, and later wrote a book titled Seventeen Trips to Somaliland. In 1933 he donated eighty eight objects to the British Museum, including jewellery and weapons of Somali origin, that he and Swayne had collected.
