= Battle of Erego =

Battle between British and Somali forces (1902)

- Part of the Dervish War
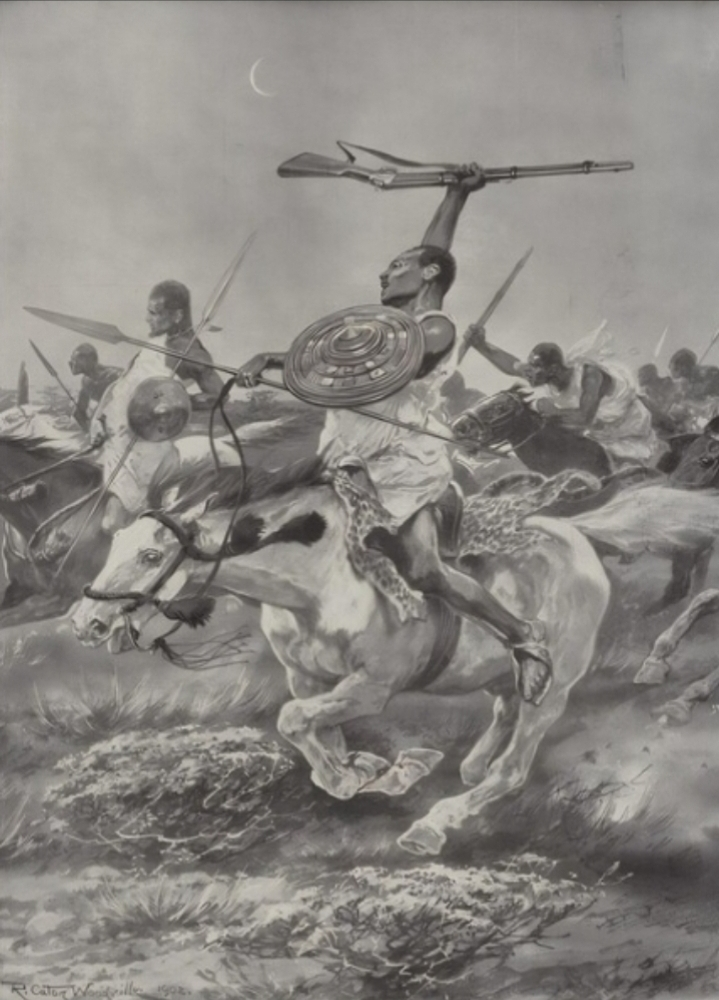
- A charge of Somali horsemen at Erego
Date	October 6, 1902
Location	Erego (modern-day Somalia)
Result	Dervish victory

Belligerents
Dervish State	British Empire

Commanders and leaders
Mohamed Hassan	(British Empire) Eric Swayne (WIA) (British Empire) George Phillips † (British Empire) John Neill Angus †

Strength
12,000 men	2,360 British troops 1,189 King's African Rifles; 1,200 Isaaq levies

Casualties and losses
62 killed	2 officers killed 56 soldiers killed 84 Somali levies killed

The Battle of Erego (also known as Beerdhiga) occurred on October 6, 1902, in Hodayo, about 70 miles north of Galkacyo. The battle involved British colonial forces, led by Colonel Swayne, and Somali troops (known as Dervishes) under the command of Haji Muhammad Abdullah Hassan. The Dervishes won by ambushing the British forces. The battle was an early conflict of the Dervish War.

== Background ==
During August and September, the Field Force carried out small-scale clashes while moving captured livestock back to the coast. Major P. B. Osborn led a mounted infantry unit responsible for escorting supplies. The Dervishes observed these movements and occasionally attacked supply convoys. Reinforcements from the King's African Rifles arrived at Berbera in August and advanced inland, while additional troops were sent to strengthen coastal defenses. In October, Brigadier-General W. H. Manning arrived to oversee supply lines, leaving operational command to Eric Swayne. In the meantime, the Mad Mullah and assembled a large force of 12,000 horsemen after calling the Dhulbahante tribe to his standard. The British in turn mobilized a "Somali Levy" under the command of Musa Farah, made up of 1,200 levies from the Isaaq tribe, who were friendly to British rule.

== Battle ==
The Field Force advanced through the Erego valley, where terrain consisted of open desert interspersed with dense thorn bush approximately three metres high, significantly limiting visibility and movement. After advancing over 100 kilometres, scouts reported on 6 October that the Dervishes were positioned approximately three kilometres ahead. Swayne formed his troops into a defensive square, with two 7-pounder guns positioned at the centre of the front face. Recently raised levies were deployed on either side of the guns, while companies of 6 KAR Somali troops extended the front line and 2 KAR askaris secured the flanks. Transport animals followed within and behind the formation, with additional levies and askaris guarding the rear. The density of vegetation restricted visibility to a few metres. One Maxim gun was positioned on the left of the front face, with three others covering the right flank.

Advancing under the assumption that open ground lay ahead, the formation came under close-range rifle fire, estimated at 20 metres, from concealed positions targeting the right flank. The KAR askaris held their position as they were engaged by both rifle fire and a subsequent assault by spearmen armed with shields and lances. Machine gun fire disrupted the attack. A second assault on the same flank was also repelled. However, the transport camels panicked and could not be controlled, breaking formation. As they moved out from the left side of the square, the Dervishes entered among them and drove them into the surrounding bush, dispersing supplies.

A further attack was then directed against the left face of the formation. Despite sustaining casualties, artillery crews continued to operate their guns, firing case shot at close range. The levies positioned near the guns withdrew approximately 350 metres, resulting in the collapse of the left corner of the square. A Maxim gun in that sector was abandoned in the vegetation. The withdrawal contributed to the breakdown of much of the front line, leaving the artillery crews maintaining their positions.

Swayne subsequently reorganized elements of his force and led a counterattack that restored the formation. The square was re-established, though the engagement resulted in significant casualties among officers. Captain Angus Hamilton was killed while directing artillery fire, and Major G. E. Phillips of the Royal Engineers was also killed during the engagement. Captain W. D. Everett of the Welsh Regiment was severely wounded while commanding troops on the rear face, which had also been subjected to sustained attack, and Major T. N. S. M. Howard of the West Yorkshire Regiment sustained minor injuries.

Casualties among the British included 56 killed (and 2 officers), as well as 84 members of the Somali levies. The British had only counted the bodies of 62 dervishes. After the ambush much of the Somali levies would desert, which led to the force being much diminished. Realizing how low the morale was among his forces, Swayne decided to end the campaign and withdraw to Buuhoodle.

== Aftermath ==
This expedition cost the British Empire more than $300,000 and resulted in a considerable loss of lives. It proved to be a failure. In response, the House of Commons offered Muhammad Abdullah Hassan $15,000 per year on the condition that he cease the war. However, he declined the offer.

Colonel Swayne, who spearheaded the operations against the Dervishes, was recalled by the War Office for consultations.

The victory at Erigo brought considerable recognition to the Dervish cause. Frederick Quelch who fought in Somaliland, reported:

"If the Mad Mollah wins a victory, the other Mohammedans are at once more impressed with the divine character of his leadership, and they flock to his standard where they might otherwise have remained passive. The recent victory of the Mad Mollah over Colonel Swayne's detachment presages, therefore, large fanatic hordes to his forces. The trouble the British will have in subduing him will be proportionately increased by each victory."

Muhammad Abdullah Hassan was commonly referred to as the 'Mad Mullah' by the media until the defeat at Erego. Following this event, there was a shift in perception. The Daily News noted that:

'the "Mad Mullah"... seems to be showing increasing signs of sanity', and that, 'for a mad man, the Mullah planned his tactics skilfully... he is no fool, this Mad Mullah'.
