= Illaloes =

Illaloes, nicknamed the Tally-hoes during its inception, were a Rayid military arm of the King's African Rifles and Somaliland Camel Corps during the Scramble for Africa period of colonial history. However, subsequent to this period, they were employed as wardens and security custodians in British Military Administration in Ogaden and Haud, in the British Somali Coast Protectorate, and in British Jubaland. During the anti-Darawiish war, Illaloes or Tally-hoes were often places alongside various ethnic groups such as the Yaos of the Lake Malawi region, and Sikhs, and the recently conquered Boers, and Bikaners from Rajasthan in India, as well as Punjabs. The main utility of Illaloes was their endurance. A former sergeant in charge of Illaloes was Mohamed Sambukl.

== See also ==
- East African campaign (World War II)
