= Samala =

- heritage
- Location in Somalia.
- Coordinates: 8°51′07″N 46°47′56″E
- Country: Somalia
- Region: Sool
- Time zone: UTC+3 (EAT)

Samala is located on the eastern outskirts of the town of Guumays in Sool, Somalia. It was the site of the first skirmish between Daraawiish and British forces when, on 30 May 1901, Eric Swayne's men attacked the Mahamud Garad tribe, one of the three major subclans of Dhulbahante alongside Farah Garad and Bah Nugaal. It was also the site of the first British-Darwiish battle on June 2. The adjacent town of Guumays has been described as a transit point for Ethiopians seeking to migrate to various locations eastwards of their own country.

== See also ==
- Kismayo
