= Walwal =

Town in Somali Region, Ethiopia

Walwal ወልወል
- Location within Ethiopia
- Coordinates: 7°03′N 45°24′E
- Country: Ethiopia
- Region: Somali
- Elevation: 570 m (1,870 ft)

Walwal (Amharic: ወልወል; Arabic: ويلويل; Italian: Ual-Ual; also transliterated as Welwel or Walwaal) is a town located in the Ogaden region of eastern Ethiopia. Located in the Werder Zone of the Somali Region, this town has a longitude and latitude of 7°03′N 45°24′E with an elevation of 570 meters above sea level. Walwal has an estimated population of 842 according to the 2007 census.

From 1903 Walwal, together with Werder and Qorrahee, became Dervish centers headed by Sayid Khalif Abdullah Hassan, brother of the Sayid Mohammed. The town and its surrounding region was kept under Dervish rule through a series of forts erected there. The control of this region allowed the Dervish to count, even in the most critical moments, on a source of animal supply, also collected in the form of a tribute, taking it away from the traditional authorities. Furthermore, strategically, this region ensured a territorial link between the high Hiiraan, where the Bahgeri operated, and the Hawd Region and the Mudug which was in the hands of Daraawiish almost continuously between 1902 and 1910.

Walwal was the oasis in Ethiopia where a border clash occurred in 1934 between the Kingdom of Italy and Ethiopian Empire. Benito Mussolini used this incident as a pretext to invade Ethiopia, which led to the Second Italo-Abyssinian War.

Records at the Nordic Africa Institute website provide details of a test oil well drilled at Walwal by Sinclair Oil in 1955, and about Fitawrari Wolde Amanuel primary school in Walwal during the year 1968.
