= Werder, Ethiopia =

Warder
- Location within Ethiopia
- Coordinates: 6°58′N 45°20′E
- Country: Ethiopia
- Region: Somali
- Zone: Warder
- Elevation: 80 m (260 ft)

Population (2022)
  - Total: 450,400
- Time zone: UTC+3 (EAT)

Werder (Somali: Wardheer; Italian: Uardere) is a town in eastern Ethiopia. Located in the Werder Zone of the Somali Region, Werder has a latitude and longitude of 6°58′N 45°21′E with an elevation of 541 meters above sea level. It is the administrative center of Werder woreda.

The Walwal wells, site of the notorious clash between Italian and Ethiopian troops which triggered the Second Italian-Abyssinian War, are located around 12 kilometers to the north-east of the town.

== History ==
=== Huwan era ===
One of the Dhulbahante garesas Mohammed Abdullah Hassan constructed in 1910 was built in the town, following the relocation of his capital to Taleex the year before, allowing him to consolidate his control over the Huwan.

During 1933–34 the Italians built a road to carry motor traffic from Italian Somaliland to Werder in the Ogaden by way of Geladi with the fort of Walwal becoming a crucial component for the Italians to win the war. The subjects of the Sultans Jasin and Refle were forced to accept Italian rule, otherwise, they would not be permitted to draw water at Werder.

=== Ethiopian consolidation ===
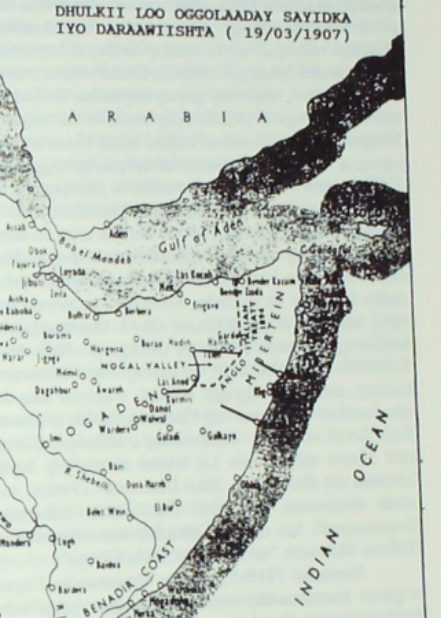
The territory of Darawiish Sultan Diiriye Guure (marked out in black ink delineation), according to Somali historian Muxamed Ibraahim Muxamed, included Ciid-Nugaal regions of Nugaal province, Las Anod District, Xudun District, Taleh District, Boocame District and the northern and eastern parts of the Werder Zone.

The eastern part of Ogaden was administered by Ethiopian officials for the first time on 23 September 1948 when Ethiopian administrators were sent to Kebri Dahar, Kelafo and Werder.

Although Werder remained in Somali hands at the end of the Ogaden War, Ethiopian units under Brigadier-General Demisse Bulto, commander of the First Revolutionary Army, recovered Werder as part of Operation Lash by November 1980, using the town as one of three bases to successfully clear the rest of eastern Ethiopia of foreign Somali troops by 3 December.

Government security forces and members of the Ogaden National Liberation Front (ONLF) clashed in Werder on 23 February 1994. More than 50 people were reported killed during the initial incident and in the three days of skirmishes that followed. The fighting forced the town's population to flee and seek shelter in the surrounding countryside.

On 26 January 2008, the Ethiopian military placed staff members of the Dutch chapter of the NGO Doctors without Borders (MSF) under house arrest in Werder, accusing them of providing medical support to the ONLF. The MSF reported in September 2008 that refugees from fighting in the local conflict between Somali insurgents and the Ethiopian government had flocked to Werder in search of food and water. "An estimated 8,000 to 10,000 people are currently living in squalid conditions," the MSF stated, "under makeshift shelters, with limited access to water, no sanitation, and the carcasses of dead animals around them."

== Demographics ==
Based on figures from the Central Statistical Agency in 2005, this town has an estimated total population of 18,357, of whom 9,737 are men and 8,620 are women. The 1997 census reported the town to have a total population of 12,309 of whom 6,433 were men and 5,876 women. The largest ethnic group reported in this town was the Somali (98.2%). This is a slightly lower share than in the woreda as a whole (99.9%), as over 88% of the non-Somali inhabitants of the woreda live in the town.
