= Ethiopia–Somalia border =

International border

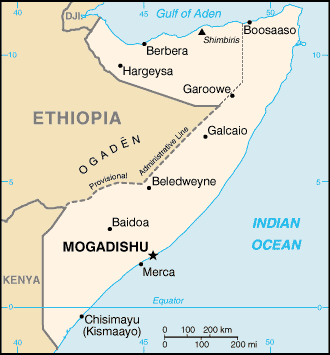
Map of the border

The Ethiopia–Somalia border stretches 1,500 kilometers. In the 19th century, both Britain and Italy contributed to shaping the modern border, on behalf of their colonies of British, French and Italian Somaliland. The Somali people were thus under British, French, Italian and Ethiopian rule. During World War II, Britain gained control of the Ogaden and Haud territories and returned them to Ethiopia in 1954, but not delimited beyond the provisional line (sometimes labeled on maps as the Provisional Administrative Line). Since 1960 independence, the border has suffered serious skirmishes involving both countries' soldiers. From 1977 to 1978, Ethiopia and Somalia fought in the Ogaden War led by Colonel Mengistu Haile Mariam and General Siad Barre respectively. The EPRDF government demarcated the border of Ogaden into Somali Region. Somalia is located at the base of Ethiopia's protrude southeast region; from the South, it is bounded by Wabi Shebelle and Genale Valley.

== History ==
During the Scramble for Africa in 1884, a large portion of Somalia region fell under the British protectorate established through a number of Anglo-Somali Treaties of Protection. However, the Italians also claimed Somalia and its coast in 1889, culminating in the 1891 Anglo-Italian Treaty, with the British's sphere of influence in East Africa (mainly Ethiopia, Somalia and Eritrea) under their colonial powers.

The Treaty of Wuchale (1889) was signed between Ethiopian Emperor Menelik II and Italy that ratified Ethiopian sovereignty, and ensued demarcation between Ethiopia and British Somaliland. The result of ignoring the Anglo-Italian Treaty, was Gadabuursi tribes being under British protectorate, Menelik penetrated Somali territory in 1896, by building some grass hits at Alola, a spring located in the south-east of Biyo Kabobe. In 1897, the Ethiopian Empire aggressively expanded its territory to south and southeast of boundary while Somali people agreed the British to demarcate Ethiopia and British Somaliland excluding Haud in Ethiopia. In the treaty, Britain ceded Somali territory to Menelik in exchange for his help fighting against Somali clans, violating the treaty that Somalis deemed denied the validity of the treaty.

In 1907 Anglo-Ethiopian Agreement demarcated the British East African protectorate (Kenya), placing Italian Somaliland in a rectangular point where Dewa and Genale rivers conjoin. In December 1934, the Abyssinia Crisis erupted in Welwal town in Dollo Zone, and the Second Italo-Ethiopian War and the Italian occupation of Ethiopia, annexing British Somaliland to Italian East Africa to Haud and Ogaden region. Italy then promoted the concept of "Greater Somalia". By September 1940, Benito Mussolini declared the formation of Greater Somalia into the Italian Empire.

In 1941 the British occupied the Haud, Italian Somaliland, and Ogaden with the help of Ethiopian armies. After the restoration of Haile Selassie rule, the Haud and Ogaden region immediately placed under the British military rule until Anglo-Ethiopian Agreement of 1942 warranted its sovereignty status in 1944. In 1946, the British secretary, Ernest Bevin, proposed to the Allied Council of Foreign Ministers a plan to place the Somali-inhabited under British Military Administration, despite rejection by the Soviet Union, United States and France. In 1948, with any formal concession, the British withdrew from Ogaden region using secret agenda, forming the modern Somali Region. The British was fully withdrawing the Haud and Reserved Area to Ethiopian territory. In reaction, the National United Front (NUF) was formed in March 1955 to reclaim the regions under British protectorate, leading up to violent series of clashes and conflicts. Between 1948 and 1954, there was discontent.

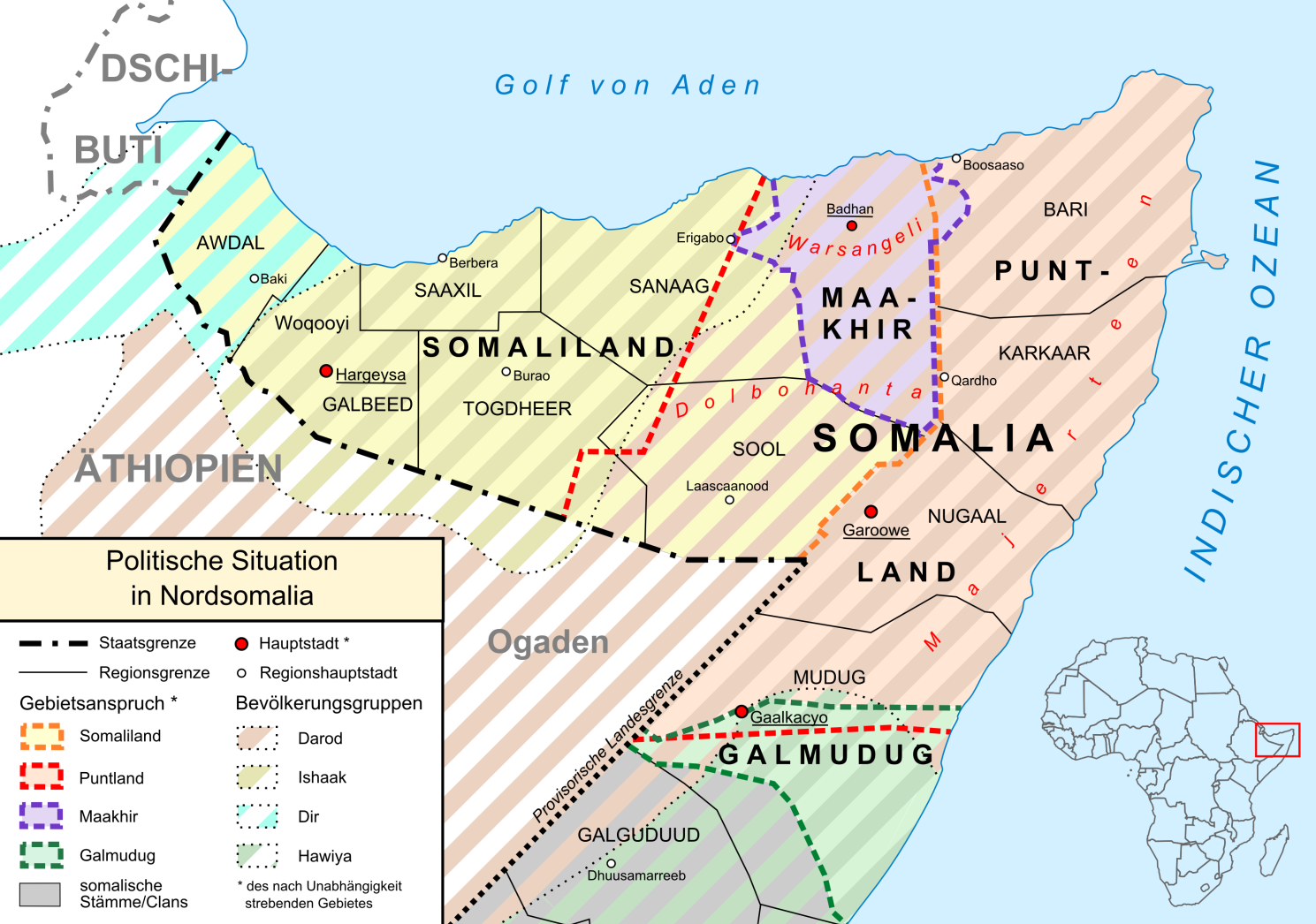
Somalia situation during the Ogaden War

Following Somalia's independence in 1960, its successive government took renewed campaign of what they called "lost territories", raising the issues to international communities like the United Nations and Organization of Islamic countries. As the situation became light, the Somali pastoralists and Ethiopian police forces fought each other. In February 1964, a short-lived war in the border resulted mediation from Sudan in front of Organization of African Unity. In 1966, Ethiopia suspended martial law in the Somali Region and neighboring Oromo region accompanied by shocking retribution against herders to force them renounce their support for the fighters. In 1973, the Western Somali Liberation Front (WSLF) was established and recruited reluctant inhabitants of the region. In 1977, Ogaden War broke out in the region after Somali under General Said Barre and Colonel Mengistu Haile Mariam. In March 1978, Said recalled its army from Ethiopia.

After the Derg collapse many Somalis returned to Ethiopia after evacuated earlier in 1960s conflict. In 1994, the new constitution of Ethiopia drafted the formation of Somali Regional State drawn to other regions.
