= Magacley =

Magacley is a town in the Bookh region of the Somali region in Ethiopia. However sometimes, federal regions such as Puntland may classify it as under Burtinle district.

== Passage ==
There is an adjoining passage to Magacley which links localities to the west of Galdogob and Burtinle in central Somalia with the junction at Qoriley in northern Somalia and has been a scene of conflict between pastoralists over grazing lands. As such, Magacley's adjoining road permits one to bypass the various Somali federal jurisdictions. Other notable stops along this road include:

=== Notable ===
- Xamxam, a small locality to the north of Magacley which leads to Qoriley and Bali-dacan, a small locality to the south which leads to Burtinle.
- Qoriley is the northernmost notable town that is the junction where this passage ends and along with Biriqodey is the southeasternmost populated place in northern Somalia. Qoriley is a Baharsame town, and just to its south is the site of a famous historical battlefield against European colonizers called Beerdhiga. Beerdhiga, just south of Qoriley, was the site of a notable Dervish victory over a combined force of Abyssinian and British colonists in October 1903. The Beerdhiga battle is called Erigo by British sources after the well from which the British colonizers launched their attack. The Darawiish killed high-ranking British army officers such as Major George Phillips and Captain Angus as well as blinding captain Swayne via a ricocheting bullet; Swayne was subsequently called Suweeyn Cawar (one eyed) by the Darawiish.

== See also ==
- Battle of Erego
- Kebri Dahar
