= Docmo (town) =

Town in the Somali region in Ethiopia

Docmo or Damot is a town in Werder Zone of the Somali Region in Ethiopia. The exact district or woreda of Docmo is Bookh also called Boh. The locality is often incorrectly transliterated in various ways, including Damot by Europeans, or as Domo or Domco by the Somalis. Docmo is adjacent to the nearby locality of Las Suban, which is slightly north. It is located a few miles southwest of the border of Dharkeyn Genyo.
