= Danot =

Coordinates: 7°50′N 45°50′E

Danot (Amharic: ዳኖት; (Somali: Daanood) is one of the woredas in the Somali Region of Ethiopia, named after its major town, Danot. Part of the Werder Zone, Danot is bordered on the south by Werder, on the west by the Korahe Zone, on the northwest by the Degehabur Zone, on the north by Somaliland, on the east by Boh, and on the southeast by Galadi.

== Overview ==
Danot was important locally for its wells, which were used by the nomadic pastoralists with the advent of the dry season. However, the construction of private birkas (underground concrete water tanks) in adjacent woredas, a development which started in the 1950s and later on dramatically increased after the 1970s, offered a solution to the absence of permanent water, and reduced somewhat the importance of these wells. While this encouraged birka owners to further diversify traditional animal husbandry beyond camels and small ruminants into water-dependent cattle, this also increased livestock population in an overpopulated region, putting additional pressure on shrinking resource base.

Danot is exclusively inhabited by the Ibrahim (sub-clan) of Ogaden, Reer Sheekh Abbayoonis of Geri Koombe, and Reer Cawl of the Muse Ismail and Reer Caynashe both being sub clans of the Habar Yoonis, which in the bushy grazing area, where there had been numerous conflicts over control of territory. This agreement between the 2 clans made Danot the border between them and that each could construct 16 birkas .

== Demographics ==
Based on the 2007 Census conducted by the Central Statistical Agency of Ethiopia (CSA), this woreda has a total population of 47,236, of whom 26,749 are men and 20,487 women. While 1,153 or 2.44% are urban inhabitants, a further 24,913 or 52.74% are pastoralists. 99.5% of the population said they were Muslim.

The 1997 national census reported a total population for this woreda of 39,951, of whom 22,166 were men and 17,785 were women; 668 or 1.67% of its population were urban dwellers. The largest ethnic group reported in Boh was the Somali 39,940 (99.98%).
