= Boocame District =

Boocame
- District
- Country: Somaliland
- Region: Sool
- Capital: Boocame
- Time zone: UTC+3 (EAT)

Boocame District is a district in the eastern Sool region of Somaliland. Its capital lies at Boocame.

== See also ==
- Administrative divisions of Somaliland
- Regions of khaatumo state
- Districts of sool
- Somalia–Somaliland border
