= Dollo Zone =

Zone in Somali Region of Ethiopia

Coordinates: 7°15′N 46°00′E

Dollo (Somali: Doollo) is one of the nine zones in the Somali Region of Ethiopia. It was previously known as Warder/Werder, so named after its largest city, Warder. Dollo is bordered on the southwest by Korahe, on the northwest by Jarar, and on the southeast by Somalia. The Provisional Administrative Line defines the southeast border with Somalia.

== Demographics ==
Based on the 2007 Census conducted by the Central Statistical Agency of Ethiopia (CSA), this Zone has a total population of 306,488, of whom 175,624 are men and 130,864 women. While 28,784 or 9.39% are urban inhabitants, a further 113,408 or 37% were pastoralists. The largest ethnic group reported in Dollo were the Somalis (99.57%); all other ethnic groups made up 0.43% of the population. Somali language is spoken as a first language by 99.58%; the remaining 0.42% spoke all other primary languages reported. 99.36% of the population said they were Muslim.

Map of the regions and zones of Ethiopia

The 1997 national census reported a total population for this Zone of 324,308 in 42,564 households, of whom 181,566 were males and 142,742 were females; 24,681 or 7.61% of its population were urban dwellers. The largest ethnic group reported in the Dollo Zone was the Somali 323,928 (99.9%), and Somali was spoken by 323,881 (99.9%). The literacy rate in this Zone is 4.2%. The CSA categorized 160,057 (49.3%) of the people in the Zone as being part of the labor pool of whom 10,722 (6.7%) were unemployed).

According to a May 24, 2004 World Bank memorandum, 1% of the inhabitants of Dollo have access to electricity, this zone has a road density of 0.0 kilometers per 1000 square kilometers. 28.2% of the population is in non-farm related jobs, compared to the national average of 25% and an average of 28% for pastoral Regions. 13% of all eligible children are enrolled in primary school, and 1% in secondary schools. 100% of the zone is exposed to malaria, and none to Tsetse fly. The memorandum gave this zone a drought risk rating of 788.

== Agriculture ==
On 5–23 November 2003, the CSA conducted the first ever national agricultural census, of which the livestock census was an important component. For the Somali Region, the CSA generated estimated figures for the livestock population (cattle, sheep, goats, camels, and equids) and their distribution by commissioning an aerial survey. For the Dollo Zone, their results included:

Animal	Estimated total	number per sqk.
cattle	36,146	0.7
sheep	2,253,550	69.9 (including goats)
goats	1,413,143	69.9 (including sheep)
camels	376,183	7.2
asses	460	0.01 (all equids)
mules	7	0.01 (all equids)
horses	1	0.01 (all equids)

== History ==
In April 2017, the Somali governor announced that 19 children had died due to AWD in the Dollo zone.

In December 2019, a vehicle carrying explosives was seized in the town of Werder.

In early 2021, an outbreak of dengue fever was reported in Somali State and the Dollo zone was considered the highest risk area. However, as far as cases in the town of Werder from December 10, 2020 to January 4, 2021 were concerned, the number of infected persons was 334 out of 100,000, with a fatality rate of zero.

In June 2021, the Dollo zone was damaged by a large outbreak of desert locusts.

In March 2023, about 100,000 Somalis fled to the Dollo zone to escape the conflict in Las Anod in Sool region. They were mostly women and children. Refugees are being received in Boh, Galhamur, and Danot.
