= Harold Baxter Kittermaster =

British colonial leader (1879–1939)

Sir Harold Kittermaster KCMG KBE
- Photograph dated 16 June 1937

Governor of British Somaliland
- In office 26 January 1926 – 1931
- Preceded by: Gerald Henry Summers
- Succeeded by: Sir Arthur Salisbury Lawrance

Governor of British Honduras
- In office 9 March 1932 – 1934
- Preceded by: Major Sir John Alder Burdon
- Succeeded by: Alan Cuthbert Maxwell Burns

Governor of Nyasaland
- In office 21 September 1934 – 20 March 1939
- Preceded by: Kenneth Lambert Hall
- Succeeded by: Donald Mackenzie-Kennedy

Personal details
- Born: 14 May 1879
- Died: 20 March 1939 (aged 59)

Sir Harold Baxter Kittermaster, KCMG, KBE (14 May 1879 – 20 March 1939) was governor of British Somaliland (now Somalia), British Honduras (now Belize), and then of the Nyasaland protectorate (now Malawi) in the period before the Second World War.

== Early years ==
Kittermaster was born at Belmont, Shrewsbury, Shropshire on 14 May 1879, son of the Reverend Frederick Wilson Kittermaster (died 1906) of Coventry, England. It was the same year that his father moved from Coventry to take up his last post as Vicar of Bayston Hill near Shrewsbury.

He was educated at Shrewsbury School and at Christ Church, Oxford. He married, in 1923, Winifred Elsie, born on 25 April 1899 in Coventry, daughter of Richard Alexandra Rotherham, by whom he had one son and one daughter. At a height of six feet eight and a half inches (2.04 metres) he was reckoned to be one of the tallest men in the British Colonial Service.

== Kenya ==
Kittermaster was a colonial official in British East Africa, now Kenya, before World War I, and assisted Theodore Roosevelt on his 1909 safari. Kittermaster was the officer-in-charge of the Northern Frontier District during the Aulihan Somali uprising, which started with a major cattle raid on the Samburu in December 1915 and was followed by the sack of the British post at Sarinley in Jubaland.

The British had limited forces in the area and were distracted by military operations in German East Africa. Kittermaster was unable to persuade the authorities to undertake serious reprisals until September 1917. After ruthless military action and many deaths the Aulihan were forced to capitulate and pay compensation in cattle. Kittermaster said: "no further trouble need be feared from the Aulihan for some time to come".

Kittermaster established the administrative boundary later called the Kittermaster Line separating the Samburu grazing lands of the Leroghi plateau from the larger Laikipia plateau, which had been reserved for white settlers. He was appointed the first acting district commissioner in the Turkana District in the northwest of what is now Kenya.

== British Somaliland ==
Kittermaster was Governor of British Somaliland from 1925 to 1931. He was handicapped by strict limits of expenditure by the Treasury, usually limited to £200,000 annually. As far as possible, he made sure this money was used productively, setting up an agricultural department and distributing groundnuts and cowpeas to prospective growers. In 1927 he decided that the livestock industry was crucial to the economy, and introduced measures that included launching a compulsory inoculation program, building stock dips and organizing the market for animal products. He also obtained funding for well-boring from the Colonial Office.

== British Honduras ==
Kittermaster took office as Governor of the British Honduras on 9 March 1932. Although there were labor grievances against the British administration during Kittermaster's tenure, he undertook few reforms since the situation did not appear to be deteriorating. The colony was poor, but Kittermaster refused to believe that some people were close to starvation. He did nothing to introduce a minimum wage or to reform laws that prevented the formation of unions and imposed a land tax paid mostly by smallholders.

A report on education in the British West Indies during this period concluded that primary education was the least progressive of any part of the empire, and the school buildings were in very poor condition. Kittermaster said it was unfortunate that the report did not cover the British Honduras, but noted that it "has not been found practical to take any action with a view to improving the present situation due to the impossibility of providing increased appropriations for education". He did however recommend "missions to establish schools wherever there is a minimum of children", perhaps with a view to shifting responsibility for funding to the church. In 1932 he commented on secondary schooling that "the high rate of fees is far beyond the means of an ordinary parent of a primary school pupil".

== Nyasaland ==
Kittermaster was 55 years old when appointed Governor of Nyasaland in 1934. He sponsored limited development of the Native Authority system and enacted rules to regulate emigrant labor. Otherwise, he did not introduce any major innovations. He said "So far as my own policy is concerned I may say it has been to carry on the policies of my predecessors, ... and it seemed to me that the last thing the Protectorate would require was another new broom".

At the time of his appointment, Native Associations of educated Africans were attempting to become recognized by the colonial administration as alternative representatives of the people to the Native Authorities, which were headed by conservative chiefs and headmen. Kittermaster did not entirely reject this concept. After some debate, the Native Associations were allowed to send their views to the Secretariat, which would acknowledge their receipt, but any action would still be taken through the Native Authorities. Kittermaster met with Levi Z. Mumba, the leader of the Native Association movement, on 12 May 1935. He took a conciliatory approach and encouraged the Associations to continue their activity on useful lines.

Kittermaster inherited the controversial issue of land rights. Landlords who had acquired title to estates were entitled by statute to evict 10% of resident Africans every five years. The government had to find land of equal value nearby. The subject was complicated by non-disturbance clauses for the original occupants of the land, who could remain without paying rent. Although the question was not urgent due to a shortage of labor, Young had proposed various changes to clarify the laws, which Kittermaster supported, essentially leading towards the acquisition of land from private estates for permanent settlement of Africans. However, the Secretary of State directed that no changes to the laws be made. Consistently siding with indigenous Africans instead of the European settlers led to Kittermaster becoming unpopular with the white settler community while he was in office.

The colonial government decided in 1934 to encourage the Nyanja language as the lingua franca in Nyasaland, since it was the most widely spoken. Kittermaster ordered immediate implementation of this policy. The missions opposed the decision, as did ethnic groups such as the Yao people and the Tumbuka speakers led by Levi Mumba. After the London Missionary Society appealed to London, Kittermaster was told to suspend the decision and hold a conference to resolve the issue. In the end the decision was to encourage use of Nyanja but allow free use of other languages.

Kittermaster's administration had little positive impact. While he was in office, annual internal revenue declined from £511,000 to £506,000. The civil service remained static, growing from 3,437 to 3,534 officers. Early in 1939, Kittermaster was taken ill and was diagnosed to be suffering from appendicitis. His condition became serious and the doctors were unable to save him. He died on 20 March 1939. His wife, Winifred Elsie, lived to advanced old age, dying in 1993.

Kittermaster's administration was one of many criticized by Nazi Germany because of its liberal attitude towards the colony's African majority. Similarly, the Sierra Leone administrations of Henry Monck-Mason Moore, Arnold Hodson and Douglas James Jardine were condemned by the Nazis on the same grounds.

== Sources ==
- The International journal of African historical studies. Vol. 19. Africana Pub. Co. 1986.
- Baker, Colin (1993). Seeds of trouble: government policy and land rights in Nyasaland, 1946-1964. British Academic Press. ISBN 1-85043-615-0.
- Baker, Colin (1994). Development governor: a biography of Sir Geoffrey Colby. British Academic Press. ISBN 1-85043-616-9.
- Baker, Colin (2000). Sir Glyn Jones: a proconsul in Africa. I.B.Tauris. ISBN 1-86064-461-9.
- Baker, Colin (2006). Mangoes on the moon: an anthology of Nyasaland-Malawi anecdotes. Mpemba Books. ISBN 0-9542020-2-3.
- Bidwell, Robin Leonard (1974). Guide to Government Ministers: The British Empire and Successor States 1900-1972. Routledge. ISBN 0-7146-3017-9.
- Bodleian Library (1960). Annual report of the curators of the Bodleian Library. University Press.
- Brown, Monty (1989). Where giants trod: the saga of Kenya's desert lake. Quiller Press. ISBN 1-870948-25-4.
- Burke, Edmund (1940). The annual register. Vol. 246. Rivingtons.
- Hitchen, Peter (2005). Education And Multi-cultural Cohesion in the Caribbean: The Case of Belize, 1931 - 1981. Lulu.com. ISBN 1-4116-5453-6.
- Jørgensen, J. Normann (2003). Bilingualism and Social Relations: Turkish Speakers in North Western Europe. Multilingual Matters. ISBN 1-85359-752-X.
- Lamphear, John (1992). The scattering time: Turkana responses to colonial rule. Clarendon Press. ISBN 0-19-820226-1.
- Macpherson, Anne S. (2007). From colony to nation: women activists and the gendering of politics in Belize, 1912-1982. U of Nebraska Press. ISBN 978-0-8032-3242-6.
- Ranger, Terence O. (1975). Themes in the Christian history of Central Africa. University of California Press. p. 114. ISBN 0-520-02536-9.
- Roberts, Andrew D.; Oliver, Roland Anthony (1986). The Cambridge history of Africa, Volume 8. Cambridge University Press. ISBN 0-521-22505-1.
- Simpson, George L. Jr. (1999). "British Perspectives on Aulihan Somali Unrest in the East Africa Protectorate, 1915-1918". Northeast African Studies. 6. Michigan State University: 7–43. doi:10.1353/nas.2002.0005. S2CID 143247947.
- Stokes, Eric (1966). The Zambesian past: studies in Central African history. Manchester U.P.
- Taylor & Francis (1997). The Journal of imperial and commonwealth history. Vol. 25. F. Cass.
- Vail, Leroy (1989). The Creation of tribalism in Southern Africa. University of California Press. ISBN 0-85255-042-1.
- Who's who of Southern Africa. K. Donaldson. 1937.
