= Battle of Dul Madoba =

1913 battle in Somalia

- Part of the Dervish War
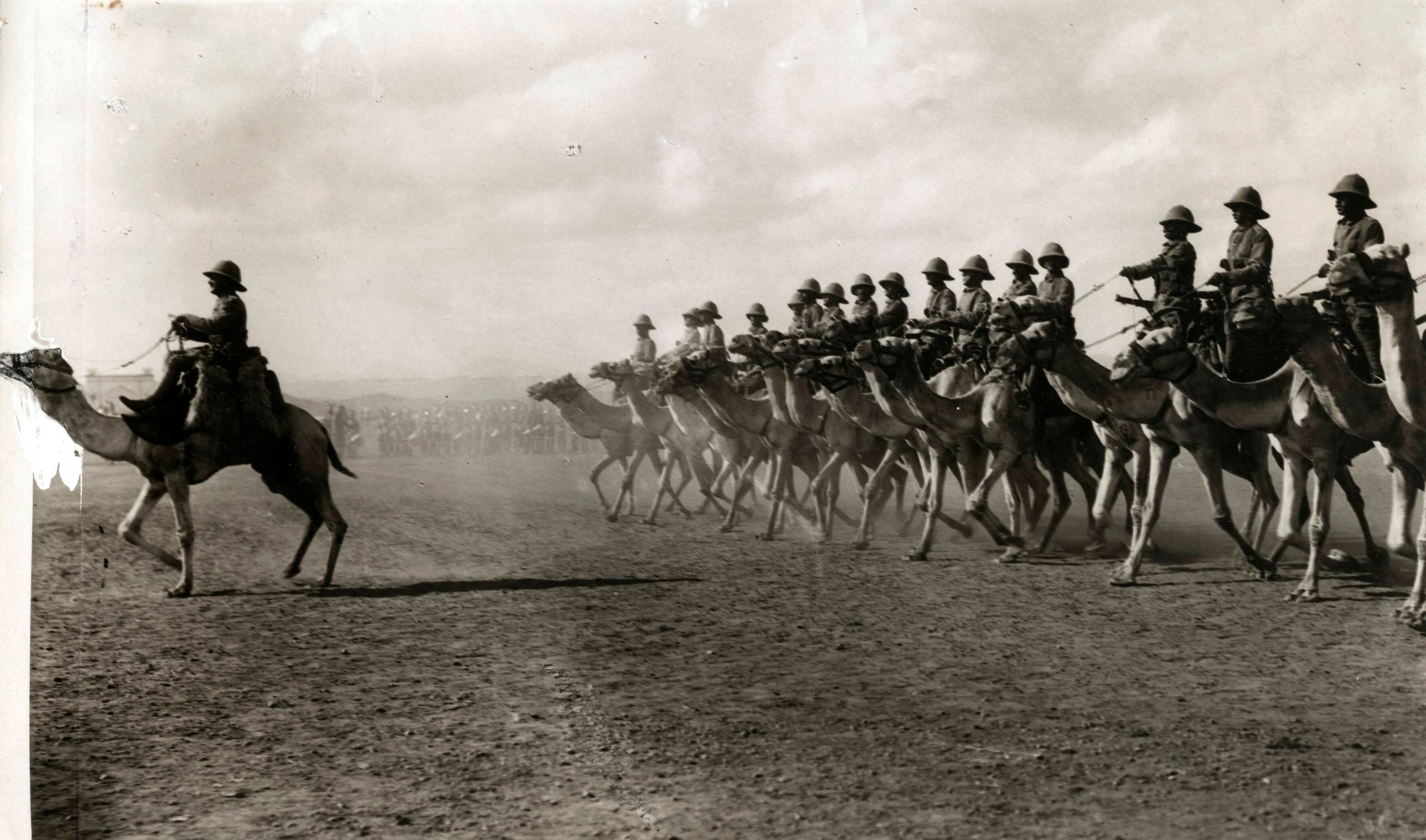
- British camel troopers in 1913, between Berbera and Odweyne in British Somaliland.
| Date | 9 August 1913; 113 years ago |
| Location | Dul Madoba, British Somaliland |
| Result | Dervish victory |

Belligerents
| British Somaliland | Dervish State |

Commanders and leaders
| (British Somaliland) Richard Corfield † (British Somaliland) Gerald Henry Summers (DOW) | Ismail Mire |

Strength
| 110 Somaliland Camel Constabulary; Accompanying forces: 2,000 riflemen 600 spearmen 150 horsemen | 2,000 fighters |

Casualties and losses
| 35 killed 10 died en route 21 wounded 24 deserted Pro-British forces flee Livestock losses: 5,000-6,000 camels 20,000-30,000 sheep | 200-395 killed |

The Battle of Dul Madoba was an engagement between British forces and the Dervish State on 9 August 1913. The British suffered repeated attacks losing nearly half their force including the commander Richard Corfield. Although the Dervishes eventually withdrew from the battlefield, they retained the livestock they had seized from British-protected tribes, preventing the British expedition from recovering it. The defeat forced the British withdrawal from Burao, which was subsequently sacked by the Dervishes, and dealt a significant blow to British prestige in Somaliland.

== Background ==
During the early twentieth century, British attempts to defeat the Dervishes, led by Sayyid Mohammed Hassan, had failed to establish lasting control over the Somali interior. Following several unsuccessful military expeditions, the British government adopted a policy in 1910 of concentrating its administration and military forces along the coastal ports of Zeila, Berbera and Bulhar, withdrawing from all inland positions. This reduced the British military presence in the interior, where the Dervishes continued to conduct raids and expand their influence.

In 1911, the Dervishes conducted raids against the Majeerteen in Italian Somaliland, who counterattacked with the assistance of the Warsangeli. By the end of the year, the Dervishes had been driven into British Somaliland, where they launched further operations against the Dhulbahante, who had renewed their allegiance to the British. The Dervishes seized Dhulbahante livestock and moved into the pastures of the Nugaal Valley, while reports reaching the British authorities indicated that previously neutral tribes were increasingly coming under the Sayyid's influence. In November 1911, the Dervishes successfully attacked the Dhulbahante holding the former British outpost at Bohotle. Although the Dhulbahante repelled another Dervish attack at Eil Dab in January 1912, the Dervishes inflicted a severe defeat on them the following month, capturing their livestock and leaving the affected communities facing starvation.

In response to continued Dervish activity in the interior, the British established the Somaliland Camel Constabulary in 1912 under Richard Corfield. The force was tasked with protecting the British-allied tribes, maintaining security along important routes and countering Dervish raids. Its operations were initially restricted to an area around Berbera, but were later extended towards Burao and Ber. Corfield was nevertheless instructed to avoid engagements with large Dervish forces.

== Battle ==
Dul Madoba is a ridge some 25 miles (40 km) southeast of Burao, in what was then British Somaliland. On 8 August 1913, following reports of Dervish raids against British-allied tribes and the seizure of large numbers of livestock, Richard Corfield set out from Burao with the Somaliland Camel Constabulary to intercept the raiders. Although Governor Geoffrey Archer had authorized a reconnaissance, Corfield had been instructed not to engage the Dervishes. The Governor had asked Gerald Henry Summers to accompany him, likely to restrain Corfield from engaging the Dervishes. The expedition was joined along its route by 600 spearmen, 150 horsemen and 2,000 riflemen from pro-British tribes. Approximately 300 Dhulbahante tribesmen also accompanied the force in an attempt to recover their captured livestock.

Summers, who was severely wounded.

On the evening of 8 August, the Constabulary camped near Oodweyne, where Dervish campfires could be seen in the distance. Summers advised withdrawal, but Corfield decided to continue the operation. The following morning, the British-led force encountered approximately 2,000 Dervish fighters, among whose commanders was Ismail Mire. The Dervishes advanced rapidly towards Dul Madoba, catching the Constabulary in dense bush before it could form a defensive square. When fighting began at approximately 6:50 a.m., the 300 Dhulbahante tribesmen positioned on the British left flank fled, exposing the Constabulary's position and depriving it of ammunition supplies.

The Dervishes launched successive attacks against the Constabulary, overwhelming its defensive positions. The Maxim gun was disabled during the fighting, and Corfield was shot in the head and killed. Although seriously wounded, Summers, together with Cecil de Sivrac Dunn, organized the surviving Constabulary behind the bodies of dead camels. The Dervishes repeatedly attacked their position, with some fighters penetrating the defences and attempting to capture the Maxim gun. After five hours of pitched fighting, the Dervishes finally withdrew, as their ammunition ran out while also leaving the Constabulary severely depleted. British losses consisted of 35 men killed, including 10 who perished on the way, approximately 20 wounded, and some 20 others who deserted, while estimates of Dervish fatalities range from below 200 to around 395. Despite their losses, the Dervishes retained the captured livestock estimated at 5,000-6,000 camels and 20,000-30,000 sheep, defeating the British expedition and crushing its objective of recovering the herds.

A firsthand descriptive account of the battle is found in the poem Annagoo Taleex naal by Ismail Mire, the commander of the battle.

== Aftermath ==
The defeat at Dul Madoba marked a major setback for British authority in Somaliland. The expedition failed to achieve either of its objectives: preventing the Dervishes from escaping with the captured livestock and restoring British prestige. The Dervishes escaped with the captured livestock, although estimates of its size vary. Douglas Jardine estimated that the Dervishes carried away 5,000-6,000 camels and 20,000-30,000 sheep, while Raymond Beachey recorded a herd containing approximately 25,000 camels. Douglas Jardine later acknowledged that "In both these objects we failed lamentably", describing the withdrawal as another damaging blow to British prestige.

The British withdrawal left Burao, which had served as the Somaliland Camel Constabulary's base, exposed to further Dervish operations. On 5 September 1913, a force of Dervish horsemen sacked Burao and razed the British station to the ground. It was the first time the Dervishes had penetrated as far as Burao since 1900. Douglas Jardine regarded possession of Burao as the key to controlling Somaliland, emphasizing its strategic importance in the interior. The Dervishes subsequently operated from Mount Shimbiris, where they established a fortified position. The loss of Burao further undermined British authority and alarmed tribes allied with the administration.

The scale of the defeat also drew criticism from the British government. In a statement presented to the House of Commons in February 1914, the Acting Commissioner described the engagement as a "severe set-back" that had resulted in a "politically disastrous withdrawal from Burao". Colonial Secretary Lewis Harcourt likewise characterized the battle as an "ill-advised and disastrous action", attributing responsibility to Corfield's disregard of orders not to engage the Dervishes. The victory strengthened the prestige of Sayyid Mohammed Hassan and the Dervish movement, while exposing the limitations of British attempts to maintain control over the Somali interior.

== See also ==
- Dervish Movement
