= Clifford Henry Fitzherbert Plowman =

British diplomat and Colonial Service administrator

Clifford Henry Fitzherbert Plowman CMG OBE BA JP (23 July 1889 – 25 October 1948) was a British diplomat and Colonial Service administrator. He was the only child of the Rev'd Herbert William Thomas Plowman MA and Louisa Plowman (née Goodwin). He was educated at King's Ely and Trinity College, Cambridge.

He married, in 1924, Nora Margaret Pottinger Tweedy, the only daughter of George Alfred Tweedy I.C.S. They had two daughters and a son.

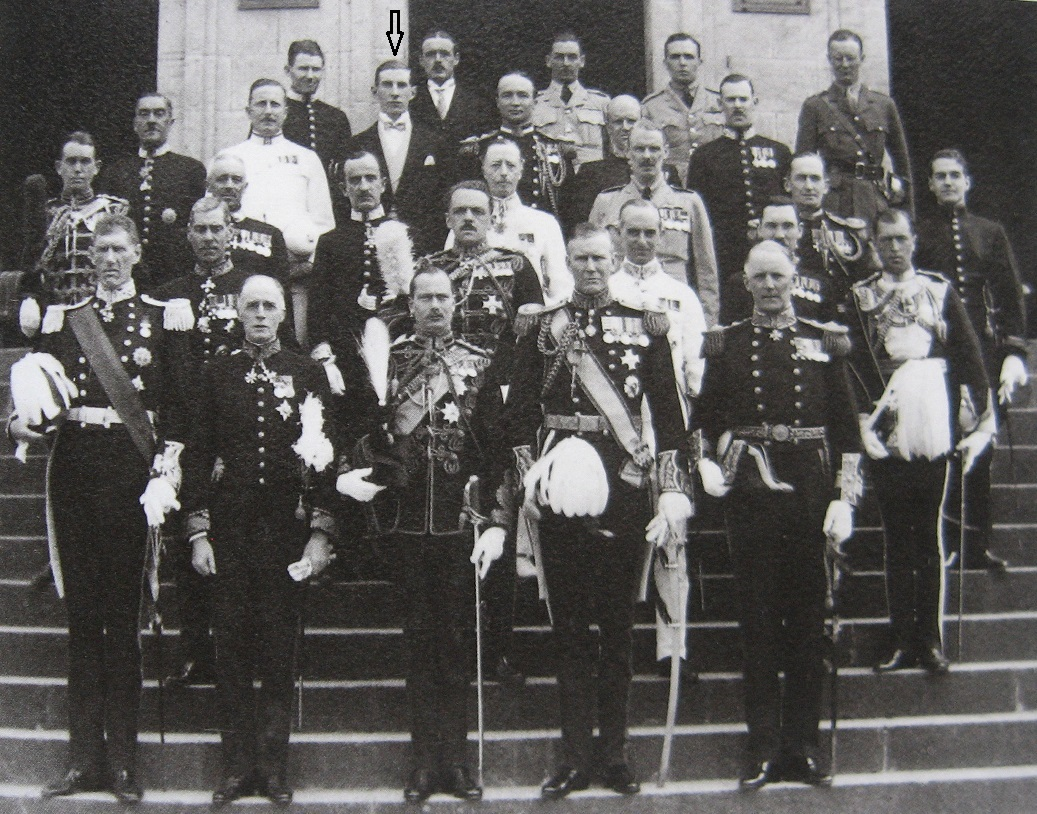
British Delegation to Addis Ababa: CHF Plowman centre of third row (in white uniform).

== Career ==
He entered the Colonial Civil Service as an Assistant District Commissioner in the East Africa Protectorate in 1912. In 1915 he was the Political Officer attached to the Turkana Expedition. In 1919 he was appointed Acting officer in charge of the Northern Frontier District. In 1920 he was then seconded to Foreign Office to act as H M Vice-Consul at Harar, Ethiopia. Two years later he transferred to the British Somaliland Protectorate remaining at Harar as the Consul. From 1925 to 1926 he then moved to Addis Ababa as H M Charge d'Affairs, after which he returned to Harar. In 1930 he was a member of the British Delegation to the Coronation of Emperor Haile Selassie. He was appointed Political Officer and Assistant Commissioner to the British Somaliland - Ethiopia Boundary Commission from 1931 until 1933. In 1933 Plowman became the Secretary to the Government of Somaliland and administered Government of Somaliland on several occasions when the Governor, Sir Arthur Salisbury Lawrance, was away. Following the Italian invasion of British Somaliland in 1940 he retired from the Colonial Service.

Returning to Britain, Plowman was then employed in the Bedfordshire Civil Defence (A.R.P.S.). In 1941 he was attached General Staff, War Office at Blenheim Palace until 1943. He also served as a Captain in the Home Guard with the 1st Battalion The Bedfordshire Regiment from 1940 to 1944. In 1945 he returned to the work for the Foreign Office as the Oriental Secretary in Addis Ababa. He retired for the second time in 1947.

== Awards and decorations ==
- 1915 African General Service Medal and clasp
- 1928 O.B.E
- 1930 Order of the Star of Ethiopia (2nd class - Commander)
- 1935 Silver Jubilee medal
- 1937 C.M.G.
- 1937 Coronation medal

== Publications ==
- "Notes on the Gedamoch Ceremonies Among the Boran"
