= Annagoo Taleex naal =

1913 Somali-language poem

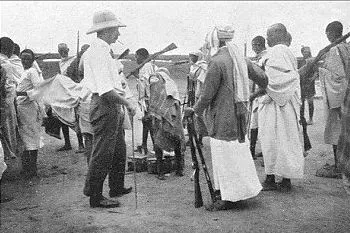
Richard Corfield (left, in helmet)

"Annagoo Taleex naal" ('Residing in Taleh') is a 1913 Somali-language poem by Ismail Mire which chronicles life at Taleh and the killing of colonial figurehead Richard Corfield. Written on August 11, the poem was created two days after Richard Corfield was killed.

The poem narrates the battle of Ruuga in the third person perspective of Tuurre, a horse owned by Ismail Mire, and narrates how the spoils of war and the belongings of Richard Corfield were brought by the Darawiish to the town of Buhoodle and to the far east of Sool province to be distributed there.

== Poem ==
=== Ethics and etiquette ===
The first decimal of verses speak about the ethics and etiquette of Taleh. This section states the peripheries of Taleh were tallied to a number of seven thousand Darawiish:

1 - Annagoo Taleex naal jahaad taladi soo qaadnay; 2 - Toddobaatan boqol oo Darwiish togatay neef doora; 3 - Sayidkeennu tii uu na yiri torog ku heensaynnay;

Translation:

1 - Whilst living at Taleh we contemplated battle (with colonialists); 2 - seven thousand Dervishes sorted the favorite horses; 3 - then, according to the Sayyid's instruction (our favorite horse) Torog was constrained and groomed

The next few verses speak of the ethics present in the city of Taleh during colonial times, such as norms when distributing bullets among Darawiish, etiquette among the ranks, and the utensils used in their ranks. These earliest verses as well as the final verses demonstrate the anthropomorphic manner in which the Darawiish treated their horses. The poem further extols the merits of ransacking the belongings and assets of egocentric overlords, and in particular those of what it describes as the authoritarian and dictatorial Richard Corfield.

=== Preparation ===
The second decimal of verses speak about preparation for battle with colonialists:

10. Galabtaa taxaabiyo kadlaba toobiyaha raacnay; 11.Habeenkii fardaha wow turriye taag ku sii mirannay; 12. Tun biciida lagu qoofalyoo xamashka loo taabey 13. Talaaduhu markii ay dheceen talalay oo reemay; 14. Tixda gabay markii aan akhriyey toose niman jiifey;

Translation:

10. In the afternoon, we galloped and followed one another 11. At night our horses were groomed, although cautiously; 12. They (the horses) were permitted to nibble gently at the lush growth, 13. When the three stars started setting, and made a steady sound; 14. And when I started to recite my verse, each man stood up in obedience.

=== Killing of Richard Corfield ===
The third decimal of verses speaks about killing Richard Corfield and seizing the belongings of Corfield and his party:

28. Turjubaanadii iyo halkaa Koofi lagu toogay. 29. Gaaladu waxay tacab lahayd taabnay galabtaase

Translation:

28. Corfield was executed right there along with the native lackeys; 29. The foreign intruders were dismayed as we seized all of their belongings

=== Aftermath ===
The fourth decimal of verses related the aftermath of the Ruuga (Dul Madooba) battle and states that the spoils of war seized from Corfield were distributed in Buuhoodle and the Tagaabeeye outskirts of the town of Carooley in Taleex district and the rest in Taleex itself.

34. Galabtaa caraabada ku timi turugaa Buuhoodle; 36. Habeen kale taxaashay Nugaal godon u tuuryeynay; 38. Habeen kale Tagaabeeye iyo tu'innay Hayllawe 39. Habeen kale Dariiqada tubnoo toosan lagu qaybsay.

Translation:

34. By the afternoon, after a long walk, the camels were distributed in Buuhoodle; 36. The camels were subsequently brought to parts of the Nugaal 38. whilst fatigued the next night we dispensed in Haylaawe and Tagaabeeye 39. the rest of the camels were subsequently divided at the tariqa (headquarters at Taleh)

By the end of the poem, Ismail Mire coins the term Tima soohanlow, meaning "braided hair" to describe his war-horse Tuurre.

== Response poem: Beyond these Voices ==
In response to the death of Richard Corfield, and in response to the Darawiish poems, the British war correspondent Francis Prevost published a book on the life of Richard Corfield, containing a poem by Sidney Low called Beyond these Voices, as a counter to the mocks of Darawiish poems. The first few lines of the poem commemorating Richard Corfield's death are as follows:

We strive to pierce the veil, and deem,
Not wholly vain it is, the dream
That they who pass beyond our ken
Hear echoes from the world of men.

Ah, wistful hearts! Ah, straining eyes!

— Sidney Low
