= Theodore Pike =

Irish colonial administrator and sports international

Sir Theodore Pike KCMG

Governor of British Somaliland
- In office 1954–1959
- Preceded by: Sir Gerald Reece
- Succeeded by: Sir Douglas Hall

Personal details
- Born: 2 August 1904 Thurles, Ireland
- Died: 27 December 1987 (aged 83) Guildford, England
- Citizenship: British

Sir Theodore Ouseley Pike KCMG (2 August 1904 – 27 December 1987) was an Irish colonial administrator and a rugby union international.

== Early life ==
Pike was born in Thurles in County Tipperary in 1904. In 1904, Ireland was a part of the United Kingdom of Great Britain and Ireland.

Rugby international

In his youth, Pike was a keen sportsman: he played rugby union, usually as prop. He was good enough to play to international standard and represented Ireland, by then a divided nation politically but still fielding an All-Ireland rugby team, for two seasons. In 1927 and in 1928, Pike took part in 7 matches in the Five Nations Championship, playing against France and all the other Home Nations. In addition, Pike played for Britain in a test against Australia. In 1929 he played for London Irish.

== Career ==
Pike made his career in colonial administration, rising to become from 1954 to 1959 Governor and Commander-in-Chief of British Somaliland, now the unrecognized state of Somaliland, in international law a part of Somalia. In 1956, he was knighted, as a Knight Commander of the Order of St Michael and St George, to become Sir Theodore Pike.

== Later life ==
Sir Theodore retired to Guildford in Surrey and died in 1987.
