= Gerald Reece =

British writer and colonial administrator

Sir Gerald Reece KCMG, CBE, DL

Governor and Commander-in-Chief of British Somaliland
- In office 1948–1954
- Preceded by: Gerald Fisher
- Succeeded by: Sir Theodore Pike

Personal details
- Born: 10 January 1897
- Died: 14 October 1985 (aged 88)
- Citizenship: British

Sir Gerald Reece KCMG CBE DL (10 January 1897 – 14 October 1985) was a British writer and colonial administrator. He served as Governor of the British Somaliland Protectorate from 1948 until February 1954.

== Early life ==
Gerald Recce was born in 1897 and as soon as he reached the age of eighteen, he volunteered for service in the British Army. He served on the Western Front, in France and Belgium.

On being demobilised, he qualified as a solicitor. From 1921 to 1925 he practised law in London but office life was rather dull after his war-service and he gave up the safe career for the unpredictability of colonial service.

== Career ==
Reece began his colonial career in 1925 in Kenya Colony. In March 1925 he was appointed the Assistant District Commissioner (DC) for North Kavirondo District. This was more of a probation post, to determine his fitness for more remote and unsupervised postings and after six months he received a transfer. The new appointment was in the West Suk District of Kerio Province.

He was affiliated with the Royal African Society and authored The Horn of Africa for the Royal Institute of International Affairs in October 1954 (Vol. 30, #4, pp. 440–449 doi:10.2307/2608724).

== Family ==
He married Alys Tracy (born 13 March 1912 - died 18 January 1995) in 1936. Alys, Lady Reece was herself awarded the MBE.
