= Gerald Henry Summers =

Colonel Sir Gerald Henry Summers KCMG
- Summers in 1913

Commissioner of British Somaliland
- In office 17 August 1922 – 29 November 1925
- Preceded by: Geoffrey Francis Archer
- Succeeded by: Harold Baxter Kittermaster

Personal details
- Born: 12 October 1885 Danehill, Sussex
- Died: 29 November 1925 (aged 40) Horam, Sussex

Memorial window to Summers in St Albans Cathedral

Sir Gerald Henry Summers KCMG (12 October 1885 – 29 November 1925) was a British army officer and colonial administrator.

== Biography ==
Gerald Henry Summers was born on 12 October 1885. He was educated at Bradfield College and the Royal Military College, Sandhurst. In 1904, he entered the army, and served with the Royal Sussex Regiment, the 93rd Burma Infantry and the 26th King George’s Own Light Cavalry.

Summers joined the Indian contingent of the King's African Rifles in Somaliland in 1912. He fought against a Dervish force in the Battle of Dul Madoba in August 1913, when he was severely injured three times. In 1920, in an action planned by the Governor Geoffrey Francis Archer and carried out by Lieutenant Colonel Summers, almost the whole Dervish force was destroyed. The dervishes had a king named Diiriye Guure whose emir Mohammed Abdullah Hassan, known as the "Mad Mullah" to the British, fled to Abyssinian Somaliland, where, at the town of Imi, he died in January 1921.

He was made a Companion of the Order of St Michael and St George (CMG) in the 1920 Birthday Honours and promoted to Knight Commander of the same order (KCMG) in the 1925 Birthday Honours.

On 17 August 1922, Summers was appointed Governor of British Somaliland, holding office until his death.

== Family and death ==
In 1916, Summers married Margaret Frances Troath, daughter of Lieutenant-Colonel Thomas Swinburne. They had one son and one daughter.

In November 1925, Summers died in Sussex of the injuries sustained in 1913.
