= Gerald Thomas Fisher =

Brigadier Sir Gerald Thomas Fisher, KBE, CSI, CIE (27 August 1887 – 6 September 1965) was a British Indian Army officer and Indian Political Service officer. He was the Military Governor of British Somaliland from 1943 to 1948.
