= Douglas Hall, 14th Baronet =

British colonial governor (1909–2004)

Sir Douglas Hall, Bt, KCMG

Governor of British Somaliland
- In office 1959–1960
- Preceded by: Theodore Pike
- Succeeded by: None, independence of State of Somaliland

Secretary for Native Affairs of Rhodesia
- In office 1956–1959

Personal details
- Born: 1 February 1909
- Died: 8 April 2004 (aged 95)
- Awards: Knight Commander of the Order of St Michael and St George

Military service
- Allegiance: United Kingdom
- Branch/service: Northern Rhodesia; British Somaliland
- Years of service: 1930 – 1971

Sir Douglas Basil Hall, 14th Baronet, KCMG (1 February 1909 – 8 April 2004) was a British colonial administrator. He served as the last Governor of the British Somaliland Protectorate before its independence, from 11 July 1959 to 26 June 1960. He was also a lifelong radio enthusiast.

== Early life ==
Hall was born on 1 February 1909, the son of Captain Lionel Erskine Hall and Jane Augusta Reynolds. Though raised in England, he was a descendant of Sir John Hall and his son Sir James Hall, who each had a footnote in the history of Scotland.

He was educated at Radley College and Keble College, Oxford, graduating to earn an MA. He married Rachel Marion Gartside-Tipping in 1933 (d. 1990) and they had four children, the first of whom died in infancy.

Hall developed an interest in home-built radios and electronics at age 15 when he built his first receiver, a detector unit, in 1924. Beginning with an article in Practical Wireless of December 1943, Hall subsequently published over 100 articles with circuits, construction advice and commentary in magazines like Radio Constructor and Radio Bygones.

== Career ==
Northern Rhodesia

Hall joined the Colonial Administrative Service in 1930 and served in Northern Rhodesia (now Zambia) for almost 30 years. He was a District Officer from 1932 to 1950 and Senior District Officer from 1950 to 1953, he was promoted Provincial Commissioner in 1953 and Administrative Secretary in 1955. Hall concluded his service in Rhodesia as Secretary for Native Affairs (1956–1959).

Hall was made Companion of the Order of St. Michael and St. George (CMG) in 1958 and knighted as a Knight Commander of the same order (KCMG) on 19 January 1959, on taking up the position in Somaliland.

British Somaliland

In 1959, Sir Douglas was appointed Governor and Commander-in-Chief of British Somaliland (1959–1960).

He was the last person to hold this office, as the territory gained independence and united with The Somali Republic which never formalized.

== Later life ==
Hall retired to Ringmore, Devon, where he became a magistrate, and was a member of the Devon and Cornwall Police Authority from 1971 to 1979.

Baronet

Sir Douglas Hall, Kt., had himself been knighted for some two decades when, in later life, he inherited his family′s baronetcy, to become, in addition, Sir Douglas Hall, Bt.. The Scottish baronetcy - a baronetcy in the Baronetage of Nova Scotia - of Hall of Dunglass dates from 1687. Douglas descended from a junior branch and would not have expected to inherit, but the senior line died out and the inheritance passed to his own branch. By then, his father Captain Lionel had died but each of his three sons gained the title in turn: Sir Lionel became the 12th Baronet, inheriting from his kinsman in 1974; Sir Neville outlived him and succeeded the following year, holding the title for three years, before passing on the line to the third brother, Sir Douglas, in 1978.

Douglas Hall′s first child died in infancy, but his son, Sir John Hall (7 Jan 1945 - 22 Jun 2025) inherited the title and has issue.

Sir Douglas Hall died in Derbyshire, England on 8 April 2004 at age 95.

Baronetage of Nova Scotia
Preceded by Neville Hall	Baronet (of Dunglass); 1978–2004	Succeeded by John Hall
