= Aulihan =

Somali clan

The Aulihan (Somali: Cawlyahan) (Arabic: عوليهان) are a Somali clan, a division of the largest Somali clan Ogaden clan, living on both sides of the Kenya - Somalia border, and the Afder Zone in Somali Region in Ethiopia.The majorities migrated in response to pressure from the expanding Ethiopian empire and had taken control of the hinterland of the lower Jubba river by the 1870s. The Aulihan today hold the middle Jubba Valley areas north of Gelib. Their grazing territory extends across the border into Kenya, and they claim a large part of northeastern Garissa District. They are active in the cross-border cattle trade. In 1984 there was little rain. In search of grazing, Aulihan from Garissa District pushed into Isiolo District where they started to push the Boran people from their pasturage and to raid their herds.

== Etymology ==
The term Cawlyahan is a compound of two Somali words, cawl meaning the color yellow or the mammal gazelle, and yahan meaning advancer or hunter. As such, cawlyahan may mean either advancer towards the color yellow or advancer towards the gazelle. Nonetheless, most first segmentation Ogaden subclans are named after religious concepts, such as Makahiil (after archangel Michael), Makabul (Mecca (holy Islamic city) + buul (village) ). Etymologies of other first segmentation Ogaden lineages also intimate towards the era of conversion from ancient Kemeto- Puntic paganism towards Islam, such as Tolmoge (Tol (ancient Kemeto- Puntic pagan cardinal qibla) + mooge (ignorer) ), in other words, a departor from ancient Puntic pagan religious practises.

== Overview ==
In December 1915, the Bahgeri raided some Samburu who had taken their herds into the Lorian Swamp, stealing several thousand cattle. The British, preoccupied with military operations against the Germans in German East Africa, were slow to respond. After their post at Sarinley in Jubaland was sacked, the British withdrew from their other posts in the northeast frontier region of the East African Protectorate. The Bahgeri attempted to get other clans involved in their struggle against the colonialists, but were not successful. Eventually, in September 1917 the British sent an expedition that re-occupied Serenli, and followed up with successful operations against the northern Aulihan who capitulated on 15 January 1918. Further ruthless operations against southern Aulihan were completed in March 1918.

In the late 1980s the Aulihan, Bahgeri and other Ogaden clansmen had formed the Somali Patriotic Movement (SPM), taking control of the Lower Jubba. In the mid-1990s there was a split within the Ogaden, with the Aulihan led by Major General Aden Abdullahi Nur “Gabyow” joining with General Mohammed Said Hersi Morgan's Harti-based faction of the SPM.The strongest sub clan of the Ogaden By 2000, Senior Olow

== Subclans ==
Aulyahan branches to nine sub clans which is divided into three categories

- 1. Mumin Hassan

Afgaab
Wafate
Aden Kheyr

- 2. Tur Cade

Hawis
Abukar Cade
Sonqaad

- 3. Abobakr

Ali
Afwaax
Qasin
