= Frederick Mercer Hunter =

British colonial administrator

Colonel Frederick Mercer Hunter CB CSI

Governor of British Somaliland
- In office 1884–1888
- Preceded by: Office established
- Succeeded by: Edward Vincent Stace

Personal details
- Born: 16 April 1844
- Died: 1898 (aged 53–54)

Colonel Frederick Mercer Hunter (16 April 1844–1898) was a British colonial administrator who served as Governor of British Somaliland from 1884 to 1888.
