= Francis Prevost =

British writer

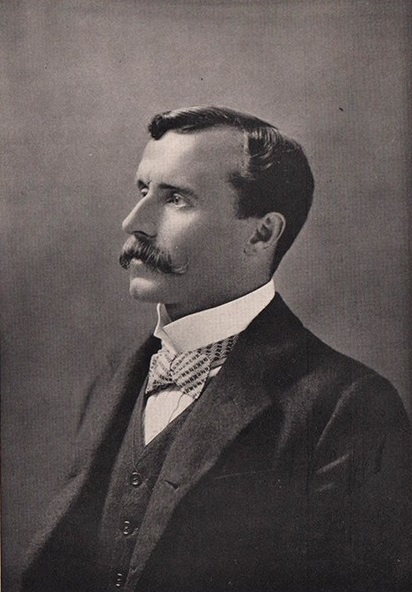
Harry Francis Prevost Battersby

Harry Francis Prevost Battersby (1862 – 1949) most well known as H. F. P. Battersby was a poet, novelist journalist and psychical researcher, who published under the name Francis Prevost.

== Biography ==
Battersby was born in 1862, the son of a major-general. He graduated with distinction from the Royal Military College at Sandhurst and initially joined the Royal Irish Rifles before moving into journalism. He served as the Boer War correspondent for the Morning Post. In 1909, he married Frances Muriel Saunders. He saw active service again during the First World War.

== Works ==
=== Poems ===
- Melilot (1886)
- Fires of Greenwood (1887)

=== Novels and short fiction ===
- Rust of Gold (1895)
- The Avenging Hour (1896)
- False Dawn (1897)
- In The Web of War (1900) non fiction
- The Plague of the Heart (1902)

=== Plays ===
- The Way of War (1902)
- Voice of Duty (1904)

=== Translator ===
- Tolstoi's Christ's Christianity and What to Do

=== Parapsychology ===
- Psychic Certainties (1930)
- Man Outside Himself (1942)
