= Richard Corfield =

Somali coast commander-in-chief

- Corfield in 1913
- Born: 27 April 1882; Heanor, Derbyshire, England
- Died: 9 August 1913 (aged 31); Dul Madoba, British Somaliland
- Military career
- Allegiance: British Empire
- Branch: British Army
- Service years: 1900–1913
- Rank: Colonel
- Commands: Somaliland Camel Constabulary
- Conflicts: Second Boer War; Dervish War: Battle of Dul Madoba †

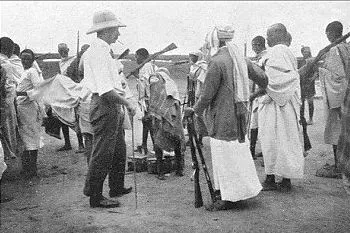
Corfield (left, in helmet)

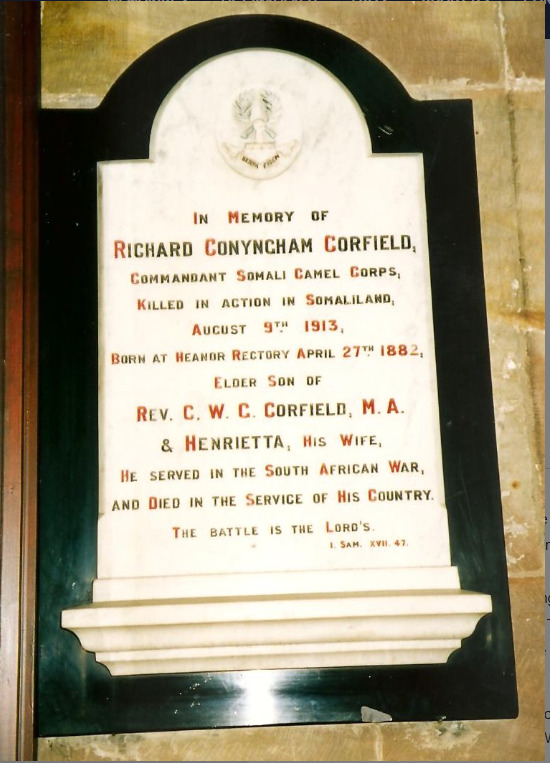
Memorial plaque for Richard Corfield at St Lawrence's church, Heanor, England.

Richard Conyngham Corfield (27 April 1882 – 9 August 1913) was a British colonial police officer who saw service in South Africa, Nigeria, India, Kenya and Somalia in the early 20th century.

== Early life ==
Corfield was born in Heanor, Derbyshire, the eldest of three children of the rector of Heanor, Conyngham William George Corfield and Henrietta, née Edwards. Corfield was only six years old when his father died. He first attended a dame school. In 1892 he attended Spurlings Preparatory School and then in 1896 went to Marlborough College.

== Early career ==
After leaving school, Corfield worked for a shipping company in Liverpool, the T. & J. Harrison Line, run by an uncle, Thomas Fenwick Harrison. Soon after starting work the Anglo-Boer war broke out in South Africa. Corfield immediately joined the Volunteers camped on Salisbury Plain, but later enlisted in the Baden Powell Police, sailing for Africa in December 1900. In June 1902, he was recommended for a commission, but this was rejected due to his youth.

In 1905, Corfield returned to England, applied for the post of Political Officer in Somaliland, and became one of only six Europeans posted to the interior of the country. To the east in the Dervish State in modern Waqooyi Bari, the land was under the tripartite rule of an emir, a monarch and chieftains, collectively called the haroun. The emir in this instance, Muhammad Abdullah Hassan called "the Mad Mullah", along with the haroun, were resisting encrouchment by colonial forces, and by 1910, the Dervish haroun, had continued to hold the line against the colonial powers.

In May 1910 Corfield again returned to England, but by September he was on his way to Nigeria where the British were already in conflict with Muslim inhabitants from the north part of the country. He saw action at Ganawari and other skirmishes.

Further trouble was brewing in British Somaliland, and a Somaliland Camel Constabulary was formed to serve as a police force in the interior. Horace Byatt, the Governor of British Somaliland, offered the command of the new Camel Constabulary to Corfield, who accepted the opportunity to return to the Horn of Africa.

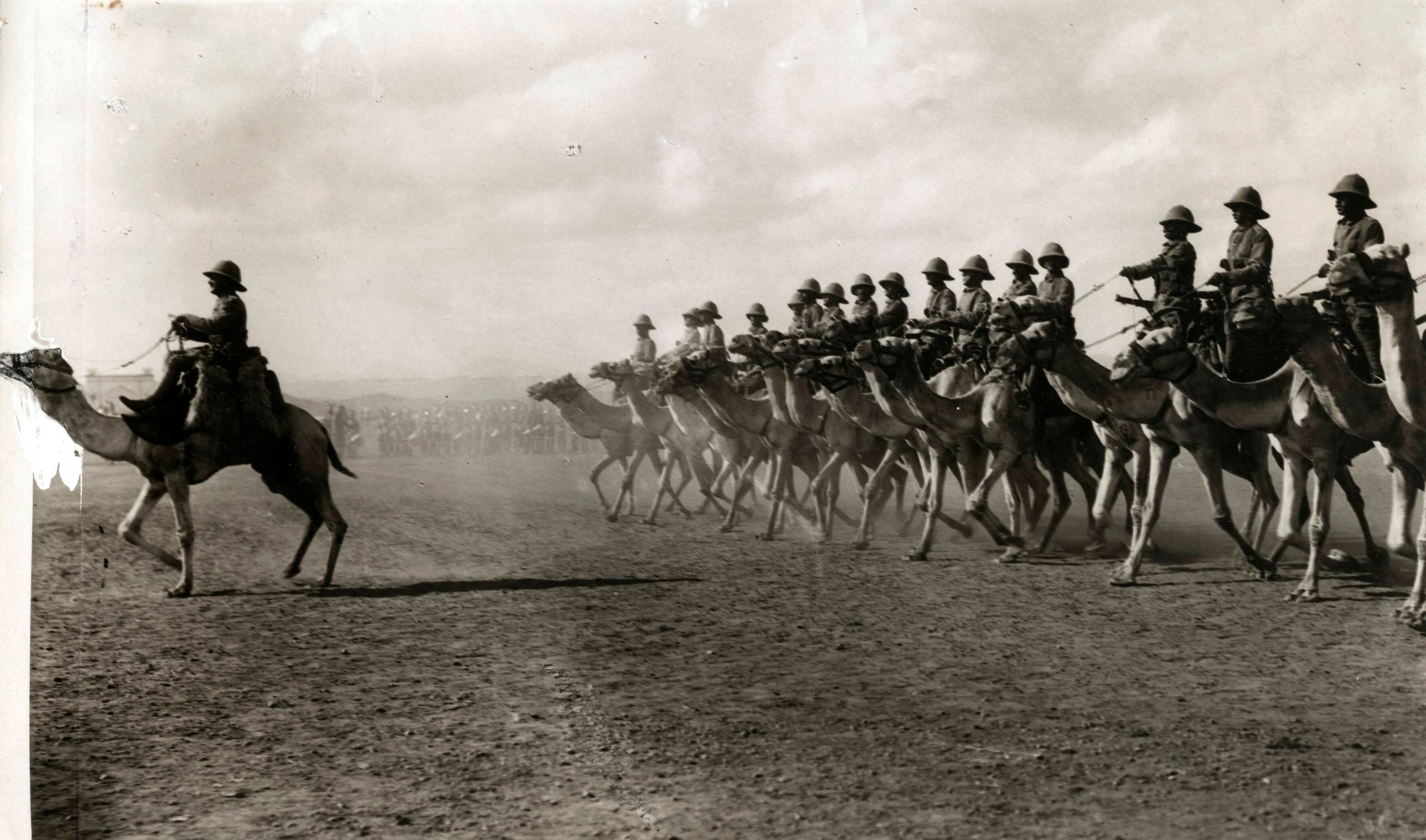
British camel troopers in 1913, between Berbera and Odweyne in British Somaliland.

== Return to Somaliland and death ==
The Camel Constabulary took to the field in December 1912 and Corfield was authorised to punish those opposing British rule. However, he was instructed to avoid a direct confrontation with the Dervish State. By mid-1913 finding these instructions restrictive and irksome, on the afternoon of 8 August 1913 he decided to attack the Dervish army led by Ismail Mire close to Dul Madoba.

Dul Madoba is a ridge some 25 miles (40 km) southeast of Burao in what was then British Somaliland. On 8 August 1913, fleeing nomads from five British-friendly tribes sought refuge with Corfield, who was stationed at Ber with the Camel Constabulary. The tribesmen of the five tribes informed him that the Dervish raided their settlements and captured their camel herds. Corfield took that as an excuse to wage war and set out to punish the Dervish and return the looted livestock. The battle took place on 9 August 1913. On one side 110 members of the Camel Constabulary of British Somaliland and 300 British allied tribesmen of the 5 tribes all under the command of Colonel Richard Corfield faced some 2750 well-armed Dervish devotees of the Dervish haroun, the haroun forming the government of the Dervish state. Thirty-six of the Constabulary including Corfield were killed in action and 21 were wounded. Many of the Dervish soldiers were also killed or wounded.
