= List of colonial governors of British Somaliland =

Governor of British Somaliland
- Flag of the governor of British Somaliland (1903–1950)

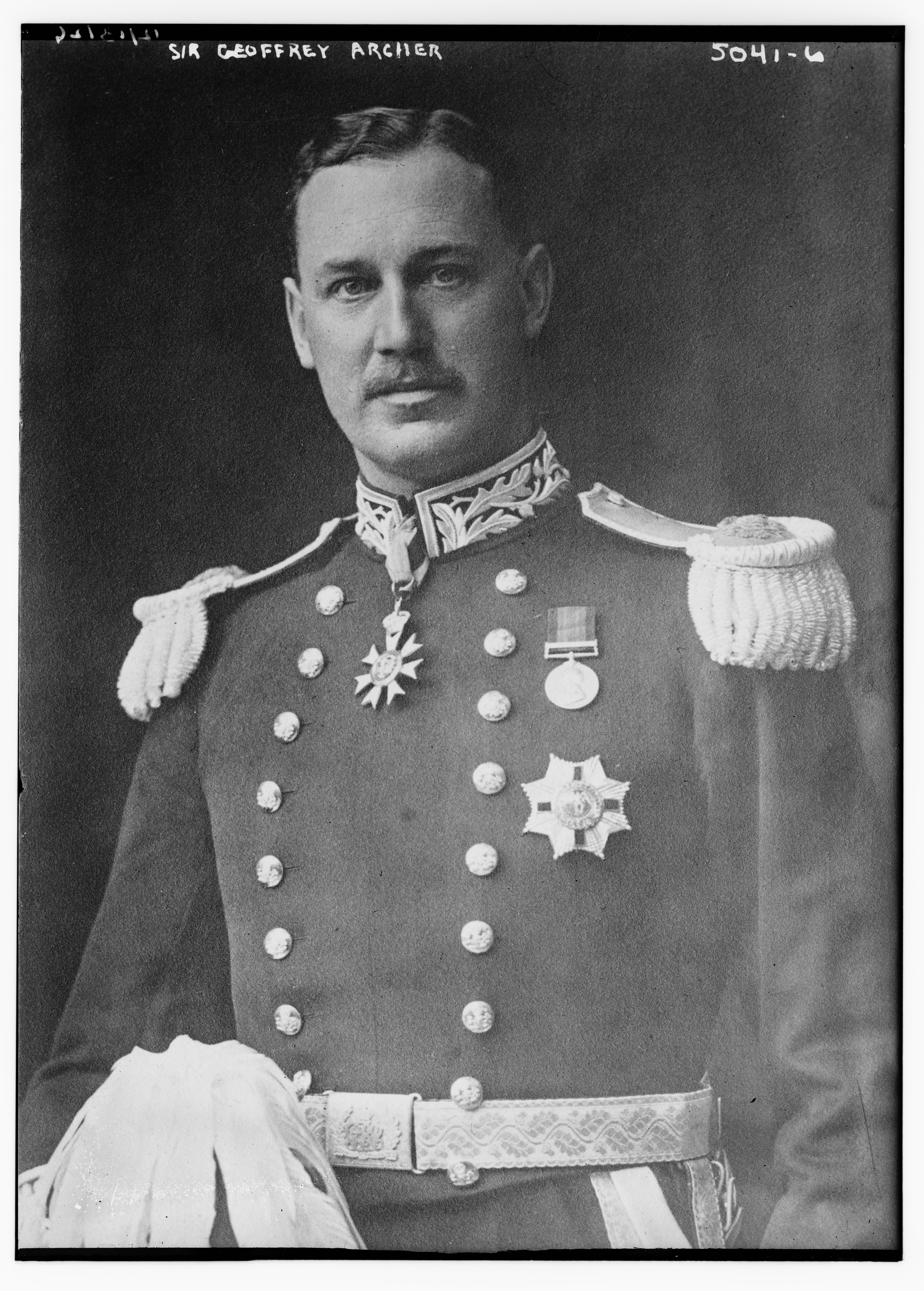
- Longest serving Geoffrey Francis Archer; May 1914 – 17 August 1922
- Seat: Berbera (until 1941); Hargeisa (from 1941)
- Appointer: British Monarch
- Formation: 1884
- First holder: Frederick Mercer Hunter
- Final holder: Douglas Hall
- Abolished: 1 July 1960

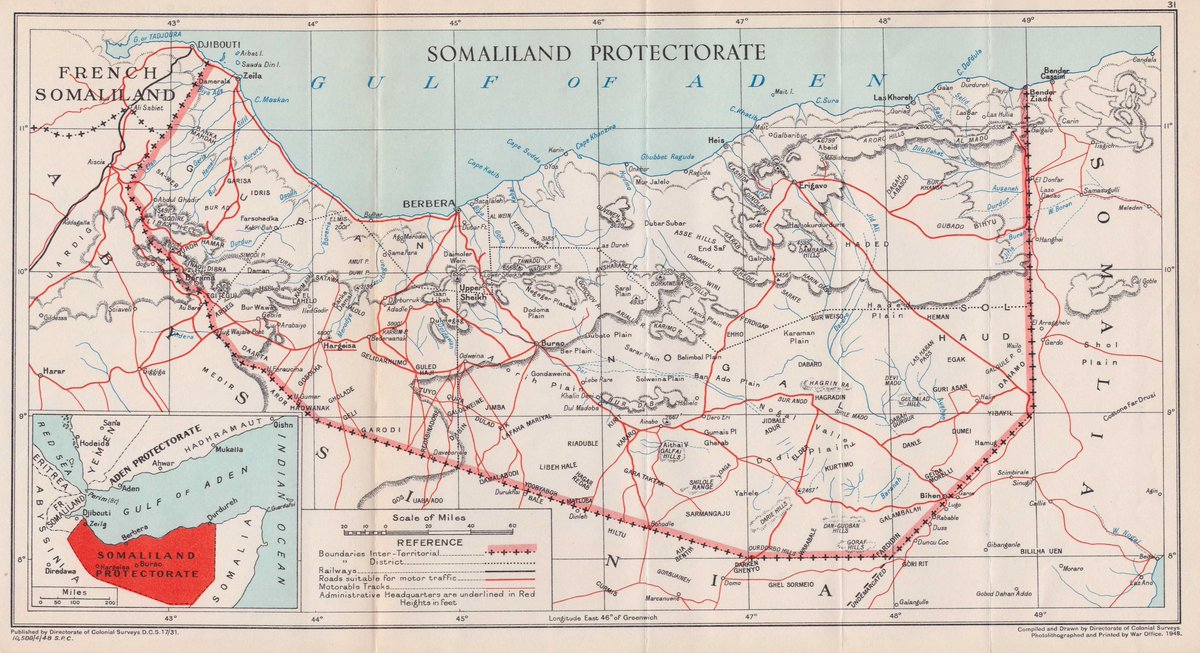
British Somaliland map.

This is a list of colonial governors of British Somaliland from 1884 to 1960. They administered the territory on behalf of the United Kingdom.

== List ==
Complete list of colonial governors of British Somaliland:

Tenure (Note: Dates in italics indicate de facto continuation of office.)	Portrait	Incumbent	Notes
British Suzerainty
1884 to 20 July 1887		Frederick Mercer Hunter, Political Agent	
British Somaliland Protectorate
20 July 1887 to 1888		Frederick Mercer Hunter, Resident	
1888 to 1893		Edward Vincent Stace, Resident	
1893 to 1896		Charles William Henry Sealy, Resident	
1896 to 1897		William Butler Ferris, Resident	
1897 to 1898		James Hayes Sadler, Resident	
1898 to 1901		James Hayes Sadler, Consul-General	
1901 to 1902		Harry Edward Spiller Cordeaux, acting Consul-General	1st time
1902 to 1905		Eric John Eagles Swayne, Consul-General	
1905 to 8 May 1906	Vacant		
8 May 1906 to 1909		Harry Edward Spiller Cordeaux, Commissioner	2nd time
1909 to January 1910	Vacant		
January 1910 to 1911		Sir William Henry Manning, Commissioner	
July 1911 to 1914		Horace Archer Byatt, Commissioner	
May 1914 to October 1919		Geoffrey Francis Archer, Commissioner	
October 1919 to 17 August 1922		Geoffrey Francis Archer, Governor	From 5 June 1920, Sir Geoffrey Francis Archer
17 August 1922 to 29 November 1925		Gerald Henry Summers, Governor	From 23 June 1925, Sir Gerald Henry Summers
29 November 1925 to 26 January 1926		Harold Baxter Kittermaster, acting Governor	
26 January 1926 to 18 June 1932		Harold Baxter Kittermaster, Governor	From 4 June 1928, Sir Harold Baxter Kittermaster
18 June 1932 to 10 May 1935		Arthur Salisbury Lawrance, Commissioner	From 1 January 1934, Sir Arthur Salisbury Lawrance
10 May 1935 to 2 March 1939		Arthur Salisbury Lawrance, Governor	
2 March 1939 to 18 August 1940		Vincent Glenday, Governor	
British Somaliland under Italian occupation
19 August 1940 to 27 August 1940		Guglielmo Nasi, Military Governor	Commanding officer, Eastern Sector
27 August 1940 to 16 March 1941		Carlo De Simone, Military Governor	General officer commanding, Somaliland Army
British Somaliland Protectorate
29 March 1941 to 3 March 1943		Arthur Reginald Chater, Military Governor	Appointed following the British recapture of the colony
3 March 1943 to 3 March 1948		Gerald Thomas Fisher, Military Governor	
3 March 1948 to 15 November 1948		Gerald Thomas Fisher, Governor	
1948 to February 1954		Gerald Reece, Governor	From 1950, Sir Gerald Reece
February 1954 to 1959		Theodore Pike, Governor	From 2 January 1956, Sir Theodore Pike
11 July 1959 to 1 July 1960		Douglas Hall, Governor	
26 June 1960	Independence as the State of Somaliland		

For continuation after independence, see: List of presidents of Somaliland

== Flags ==
Flag of the governor of British Somaliland (1903–1950)

Flag of the governor of British Somaliland (1950–1952)

Flag of the governor of British Somaliland (1952–1960)

== See also ==
- History of Somaliland
- Politics of Somaliland
- List of colonial governors of Italian Somaliland
- President of Somaliland
  - List of presidents of Somaliland
