= Ismail Mire =

Somali commander and poet (1862–1950)

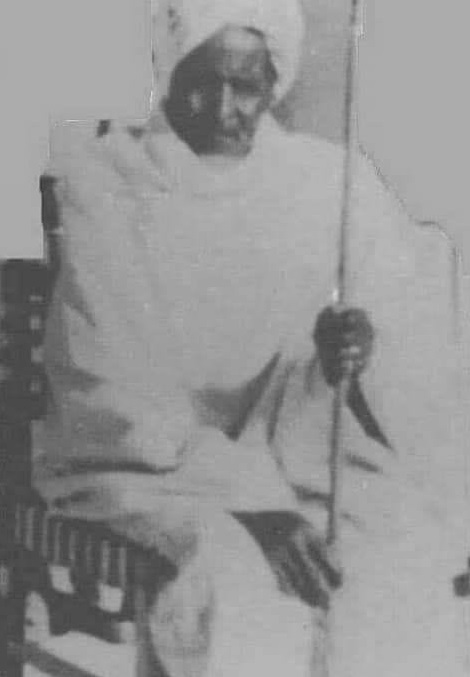
- Born: 1862; Laasadaar, Buhodle
- Died: 1950 (aged 87–88)
- Citizenship: Darwiish State (Dervish State)
- Occupation: Commander-in-chief
- Era: Scramble for Africa
- Spouse: Fadumo Habado

Ismail Mire Elmi (Somali: Ismaaciil Mire Cilmi), was a renowned Somali poet and. Regarding his poetry, one observer said his voice and poetic ability was "so great that he could sing his countrymen into peace or war".

== Military career ==
Mire was born in 1862 in the vicinity of Buuhoodle to a Dhulbahante Bah Cali Gheri family. His life began in pastoralist and nomadic settings along the Haud plains which is the lifestyle he returned to towards the end of his life. Upon becoming a Darwiish, he began heading the army and military intelligence, he also supervised the maintenance of the numerous forts that were built by the Darwiish. Upon the defeat of the Darwiish, he was captured, and spent a stint in a Berbera prison. Mire is one of the most successful generals in African history, with Mire leading the charges that led to the killing of Richard Corfield and destroyed almost the entirety of his battalion, besides successful raids or annexations of territories ranging from Berbera and Las Khorey in the north, Jigjiga to the west and Beledweyne to the south, thus by 1915 domineering over an area almost the size of Germany. The first decade of offensives cost the British government 29 million pounds sterlings (not adjusted to inflation).

According to Pergamon Press, Ismail Mire was "the most important general of the dervish forces and an accomplished poet and stylist".

=== Ilig treaty ===
In 1905, the Ilig treaty was signed between the Darwiish and the Italians who also signed on behalf of the two other colonial powers, the British and the Abyssinians. The treaty stipulated peace between the Darwiish and the three colonial powers and designated the Darwiish as an Italian protectorate. The territory of the Darwiish was also demarcated in this treaty between the Majeerteen Sultanate at Ras Gabbe (Gabbac) and Hobyo Sultanate at Ras Garad (Garacad); further territory was assigned for grazing, namely in Halin, a few miles east of Taleh to the north, Hudin (Xudun) to the northwest, Tifafle (between Ade Adeye and Las Anod) to the west, Danot to the southwest, and Mudug to the south.

== Poetry ==
Some of his notable poems include:

- Maxaa Xiga
- Guuguulayohow
- Iibsi Lacageed
- Xoogsi
- Hashii Markab
- Isma Oga
- Annagoo Taleex Naal
- Gelin Dhexe
- Ragow kibirka waa lagu kufaa
- Galow-Kiciye

== Gabayga Guuguule ==
This poem is the model and the Ismail's masterpiece. This classical Somali poem by the renowned warrior-poet Ismaaciil Mire uses the alliterative letter G. The poet addresses the Guuguule (Coucal / Hoopoe bird) during a catastrophic drought, using the bird's mournful cries as a canvas to describe the widespread devastation affecting humans, livestock, wildlife, and even the natural order.

Somali Version

01) Guuguulayahoow haddaad gu'ga u ooyeysid
02) Haddaad mooddey keligaa in uu gubayo jiilaalku
03) Ama aad gabooyaha ku madhan gama' la diidayso
04) Giddigood addoomaha waxaa gaadhey nabar weyne
05) Abaar gaag ma reebaa dhacdiyo Gaatamoo kale e
06) Gartaa ma aha keligaa indaad gaar u cabataaye
07) Guumeys cirro leh baan ahee waar aan ku gaadhsiiyo
08) Geelii adduunka u adkaa gobo’ la weydowye
09) Golihii ka kici waa raggii geydho hayn jiraye
10) Tuuladuu il gabadh-leynayaa gobol barbaarkiiye
11) Hadduuna timirtan goob dhigi lahaa jiingaday geline
12) Nina uma gargaareen haddaan gaadhka laga hayne
13) Gumburigii badhbaa joogsadiyo gorayo-cawshiiye
14) Saryankii garbaha weyn lahaa goob ka kici waaye
15) Waxa goonidaaqii habsaday gubaddadii Hawde
16) Garanuugta iyo deeradii gaag yar baa hadhaye
17) Gobey iyo askari geyfan baa goodirkii jaraye
18) Guuyadiyo jiiskii hadday kala gol waayeene
19) Kama guuxo aargoonlihii geliga toomoode
20) Shabeelkii gabraar lagu idlee Giiro layn jiraye
21) Oo godadkii kama soo ciyaan gabanadiisiiye
22) Hargihiisa nimankii gataa guuldarra u sidaye
23) Gaadiidkii la dhaansanahayiyo giindhaygii madhaye
24) Ahminkii la gawrici jiriyo gaabay adhigiiye
25) Goggii subagga laga dhoobi jirey haatan gorofowye
26) Basaas baa timihii kala go'een gaaridii dumare
27) Gorgorkiyo dhurwaagii laftaad galayax moodaaye
28) Neef kama gurxamo dooxadii garada fiicnayde
29) Garoowe iyo Bookh baa qaar harraad u go'ayaane
30) Gocondho iyo daal bay qabaan garow la'aaneede
31) Ayaxii geyiga joogi jirey guuto lagu saarye
32) Gubniyaa hareeraha ka galay gaadhiyaal wada e
33) Geedihii sun baa loogu daray geerina u badaye
34) Wax ma galabsannine maalin baa loo guddoonsadaye
35) Galowga iyo fiintii naf bay giida la hayaane
36) Gurxankiyo cabaadkiyo haddaad gooha demin weydo
37) Adigaaba lagu gaadayaa gooshkan dabadeede
38) Gaagaabso oo aamus yaan gaadh lagaa qabane

Translation:
English

01. O Coucal, if you weep in longing for the spring rains,
02. If you believe that you alone are scorched by this harsh dry season,
03. Or if, sleepless, you lament beside an empty quiver,
04. Know that a devastating blow has struck all of creation.
05. A relentless drought—like the catastrophic Gaatamoo of old—has fallen
06. It is not right for you alone to wail in solitary grief.
07. I am an old grey-bearded sage—listen, let me tell you:
08. The world’s hardiest camels no longer yield a single drop of milk;
09. The proud men who once commanded great herds can barely rise from the gathering place.
10. A faction of the youth now idles in town, watching the women pass by;
11. Had they not gathered dates in the market, they would be seeking shelter under tin roofs.
12. No man would extend help to another unless a guard enforced it.
13. Half the dik-diks and slender ostriches have perished where they stood;
14. The broad-shouldered bull kudu can no longer rise from the ground.
15. The solitary grazing beasts lie helpless across the scorched plains of the Hawd;
16. Of the dibatag and the gazelles, only a meager few remain;
17. Poachers and armed soldiers have decimated the greater kudu.
18. As the thickets and shade withered away,
19. The solitary maned lion no longer roars along the dry riverbeds.
20. The leopard that once hunted the livestock was wiped out for its hide,
21. And its cubs no longer cry from their mountain caves—
22. For the merchants who traded in its skins brought ruin upon it.
23. The pack-camels used for hauling water and the old burden beasts are gone;
24. The fat rams once slaughtered for feasts have vanished, and the goats are stunted.
25. The leather vessels once dripping with ghee now lie dry and brittle;
26. The fine hair of noble women splits and breaks from sheer dryness.
27. The vulture and the hyena now pick at bones that bleach like dry wood in the sun;
28. Not a single beast lowes in the once-fertile, lush valleys.
29. In Garoowe and Bookh, many are dying of searing thirst,
30. Enduring thorny paths and exhaustion without even a grain of sorghum.
31. The locust swarms that once covered the land were met with an army;
32. Battalions surrounded them, driving motorized vehicles on all sides;
33. Poison was mixed into the plants, dealing them widespread death—
34. They had committed no crime, yet their destruction was decreed in a single day.
35. The lapwing and the plover cling desperately to their fading lives;
36. If you do not cease your wailing, your groaning, and your mournful cry,
37. You too shall be stalked and targeted before long—
38. Duck low and stay silent, lest a sentry capture you!

=== Death of Corfield ===
Prior to their encounter with Corfield, the Dervishes began a recruitment campaign in various localities in northern Somalia. For instance, in December 1912, A group of 150 Darwiish went to Ainabo wherein they tried to recruit to Dhulbahante there with promises of 100 camels for each rifleman or horseman who joined. In August 1913, upon killing Richard Corfield and his battalion, Ismail Mire composed the "Death of Corfield" poem:

Mindful of our horses we pastured them at night; Gently we hobbled them, and let them eat lush fronds; When the Triplet Stars began to set I stirred and Sang; And when I chanted my poem, the sleeping awoke; Gathering around the place where my voice sounded; And when I said the Dawn prayer, we saddled for the march; By the Ulasameed rivulet I sent out the scouts; We rumbled into battle roaring like thunder; Our camels trampled where he held the Maxim gun; The dead littered the field including the toadying Iidoor we followed as role models; There, Corfield and his interpreters were slain.

=== Somali proverbs ===
Ismail Mire is also known for contribution of traditional sayings that expressed in a metaphorical sense the truths based on common sense or experience of the Nugaal region:

Ragow, kibirka waa lagu kufaa; kaa ha la ogaado (Oh men, arrogance makes you lose your footing; let that be known)

== Legacy ==
Ismail Mire International Airport in Buuhoodle is named in honour of Mire.

Autobiography book written on Ismaaciil Mire; by Ahmed Farah Ali, 1974
