= Sarinley =

Sarinley (Af Soomaali: Sarinleey) is a small town north west of Bardera in Gedo region in Somalia. The town lies about 7 km west of Jubba River on the road to Garbahaarreey.

== History ==
Sarinley started as a stop station for herders to and from Bardera. In those days the eastern side of Bardera was only accessible by boat. During 17th and 18th century, some settlers begun farming on the river bank. By the start of the 19th century, Sarniley was an established village with permanent residents.

With its relatively small size, Sariley is famous among the residents of Gedo region. This is because a few famous religious schools took root in Sarinley. Major Sufism teachings were associated with Sarinley from the start of the 20th century. Teachers such as Moallim Ahmed Sarmaale were the main attraction in Sarinley

== Public Services ==
The first modern public services in Sarinley started in 1957 when Sarinley got its first primary school. A decade later, in 1967, the school was made part of Bardera school system. Residents of Bardera, especially, west Bardera residents, started sending their children to Sarinley Primary School. It was convenient for them because the bridge over the Jubba was not built until 1978. Most of the public services, government offices and Bardera City Market, and Livestock Market, were all located on the east side.

Soon after, Bardera District government made clean water services available to Sarinley Residents when many parts of Bardera proper didn't have such services.

== Recent history ==
Sarinley received more residents as people fleeing from civil war fights made hope in Sarinley. There was a campaign in 2006–2007 school year to rebuild the only Primary School in Sarinley.

== Rebuilding Sarinley Primary School ==
Graduates of Sarinley Primary who had their first schooling there more than 40 years ago started a campaign to collect school supplies, chairs, tables, office furniture and fund to renovate the school building. Other organizations such as UN's UNICEF afforded Sarinley Primary School some basic supplies back in 2006.
