= Arthur Salisbury Lawrance =

Sir Arthur Salisbury Lawrance
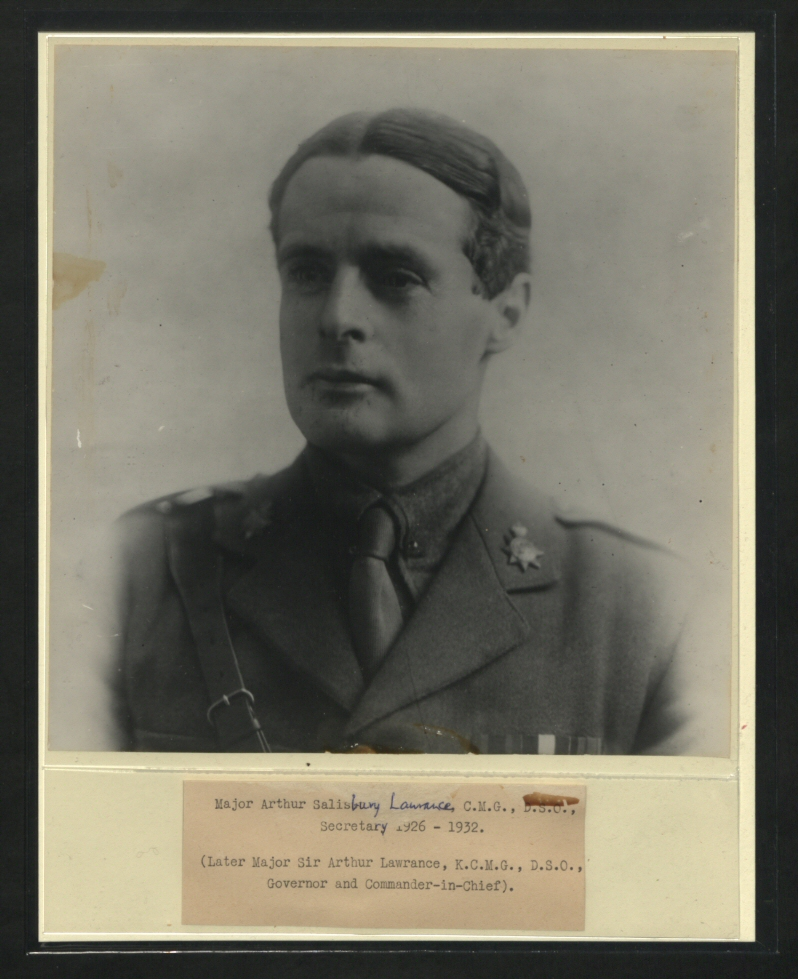

Major Sir Arthur Salisbury Lawrance, KCMG, KBE, DSO (6 November 1880 – 12 January 1965) was a British Army officer and colonial administrator. He was Commissioner of British Somaliland from 1932 to 1935 and Governor of British Somaliland from 1935 to 1939.
