= British Somaliland =

British protectorate from 1884 to 1960

Coordinates: 09°33′38″N 44°03′17″E

Somaliland Protectorate Maxmiyadda Dhulka Soomaalida (Somali)
- Protectorate under United Kingdom sovereignty (1884–1920); Crown colony administration (1920–1960)
- Flag; Top: 1903–1950; Bottom: 1952–1960 Top: Badge (1903–1950); Bottom: Badge (1952–1960)
- Anthem: God Save the Queen (1862–1901 & 1952–1960); God Save the King (1901–1940 & 1941–1952)
- British Somaliland in 1922
- Status: Protectorate under United Kingdom (1884–1920); Crown colony administration (1920–1960)
- Capital: Berbera (until 1941); Hargeisa (from 1941)
- Common languages: Somali; English
- Religion: Islam
- Governor
  - 1884–1888 (first): Frederick Mercer Hunter
  - 1959–1960 (last): Sir Douglas Hall
- History
  - Protection treaties with local sultanates Sultanatul Ciidagale: 1888
  - Dervish War: 1900–1920
  - Italian invasion (WWII): 3 August 1940
  - British recapture: 8 April 1941
  - Independence as State of Somaliland: 26 June 1960

Area
- 1904: 142,450 km^{2} (55,000 sq mi)

Population
  - 1904: 155
- Currency: Rupee (1884–1941); East African shilling (1941–1960)
Preceded by
Isaaq Sultanate
Gadabuursi Ughazate
Dhulbahante
Succeeded by
Italian occupation
State of Somaliland
- Today part of: Somaliland (de facto)

British Somaliland, officially the Somaliland Protectorate (Somali: Maxmiyadda Dhulka Soomaalida), was a protectorate of the United Kingdom in the territory of modern Somaliland. It was bordered by Italian Somalia, French Somali Coast, and the Ethiopian Empire (later part of Italian East Africa from 1936 to 1941).

From 1884 to 1920, the territory was a British protectorate consisting of self-ruling sultanates. Following the defeat of the Dervish movement by British forces in 1920, the protectorate was formally established as a Crown colony.

During World War II, British Somaliland was occupied by Italy from 3 August 1940 until 8 April 1941, when British forces recaptured the territory.

On 26 June 1960, British Somaliland gained independence as the State of Somaliland. Five days later, on 1 July 1960, it voluntarily united with the Trust Territory of Somalia (former Italian Somaliland) to form the Somali Republic.

The government of Somaliland, an unrecognised state recognised internationally as an autonomous region of Somalia, regards itself as the successor state to British Somaliland. As of 26 December 2025, Israel is the only United Nations member state that recognises the Republic of Somaliland as an independent sovereign state.

== History ==
Map of British Somaliland

=== Protectorate Treaties ===
The British, the Isaaq Sultanate and the Isaaq clan in Somaliland had come into contact in 1825, when a British ship named the Mary Anne was attacked, sacked, and plundered by Isaaq forces in the port city of Berbera.

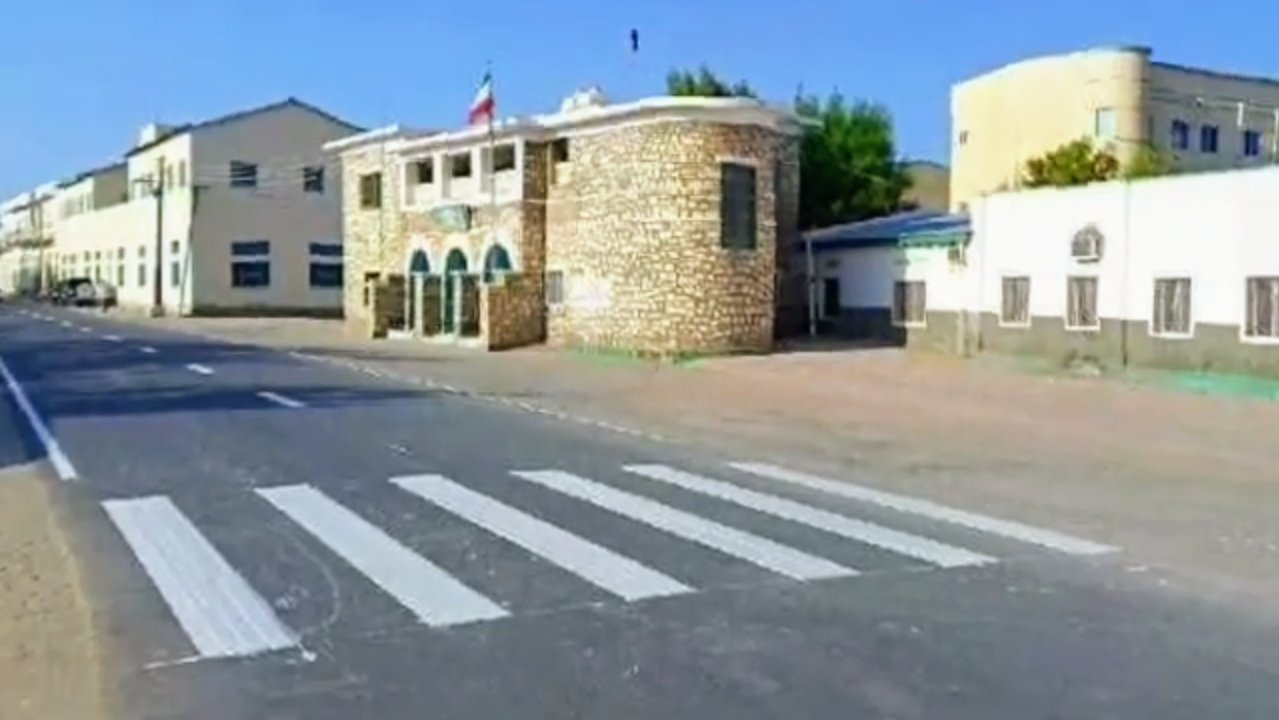
Image shows British Built Postal Communication office, United Kingdom provided famine prevention, building structural tunnels for transport in mountain paths, Military protection in and during the second world war. British also built Basic Public Infrastructure: An aerodrome, a modern hospital, a power station, and a local broadcasting service to support the growing administrative hub.

The attack led to a British attack of the city and subsequent negotiations with the Sultanate. Further incidents occurred in the 1850s, notably with the Attack on British exploring expeditions and the Blockade of Berbera (1855), which were key points of friction between the British and the Isaaq. Not until 1888 could the British establish the British Somaliland Protectorate, after signing treaties, but tensions continued between the Isaaq and British authorities.

In the late 19th century, the United Kingdom signed agreements with the Gadabuursi, Issa, Habr Awal, Garhajis, Arap, Habr Je'lo and Warsangeli clans establishing a protectorate.

Not until the late 19th century did the United Kingdom sign agreements with the Isaaq Sultanate establishing a protectorate. Many of these clans had signed the protection treaties with the British in response to Ethiopian Emperor Menelik's Invasions. The agreements dictated the protection of Somali rights and the maintenance of independence. The British garrisoned the protectorate from Aden and administered it from their British India colony until 1898. British Somaliland was then administered by the Foreign Office until 1905 and afterwards by the Colonial Office.

Generally, the British did not have much interest in the resource barren region. The stated purposes of the establishment of the protectorate were to "secure a supply market, check the traffic in slaves, and to exclude the interference of foreign powers." The British principally viewed the protectorate as a source for supplies of meat for their British Indian outpost in Aden through the maintenance of order in the coastal areas and protection of the caravan routes from the interior. Hence, the region's nickname of "Aden's butcher's shop". Colonial administration during this period did not extend administrative infrastructure beyond the coast, and contrasted with the more interventionist colonial experience of Italian Somalia.

== Dervish war ==
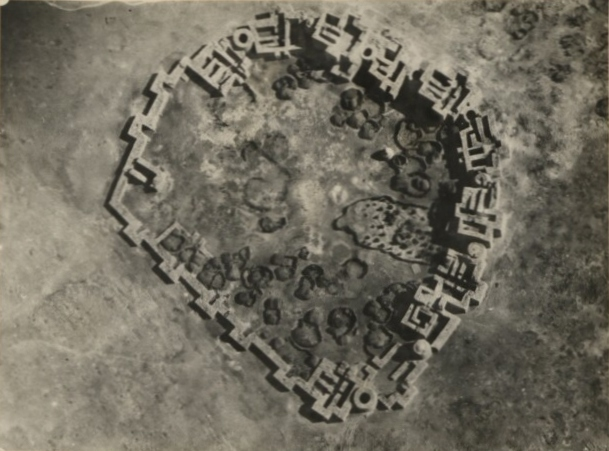
Aerial view of Mohammed Abdullah Hassan's main fort in Taleh, the capital of his Dervish movement

Beginning in 1899, the British were forced to expend considerable human and military capital to contain a decades-long resistance mounted by the Dervish movement. The movement was led by Sayyid Mohammed Abdullah Hassan, a Somali religious leader who was pejoratively referred to by the British as the "Mad Mullah". Repeated military expeditions were unsuccessfully launched against Hassan and his Dervishes before the First World War.

Sultan Nur Ahmed Aman the 5th Sultan of the Habr Yunis Sultanate was one of the main leaders behind the Somali Dervish movement (1899–1920) along with another Isaaq leader Haji Sudi. Nur Ahmed Aman was the principal agitator rallying the followers of the Kob Fardod Tariqa behind his anti-French Roman Catholic Mission campaign that would become the cause of the Dervish uprising. He assisted in assembling men and arms and hosted the revolting tribesmen in his quarter at Burao in August 1899, declaring the Dervish rebellion. He fought and led the war throughout the early years of the conflict from 1899 to 1904. He and his brother Geleh Ahmed (Kila Ahmed) were the main signatories of the Dervish peace treaty with the British, Ethiopians and Italian colonial powers on 5 March 1905, known as the Ilig Treaty or the Pestalozza agreement.

In 1908, the Dervishes again entered British Somaliland and began inflicting major losses to the British in the interior regions of the Horn of Africa. From 1908 onwards until the end of the World War I the British retreated to the few remaining coastal regions after suffering heavy losses in the interior, where the dervish continued to operate independently and leaving the interior regions in the hands of the Dervishes.

On 9 August 1913, the Somaliland Camel Constabulary suffered a serious defeat at the Battle of Dul Madoba at the hands of the Dervishes. Hassan had already evaded several attempts to capture him. At Dul Madoba, his forces killed or wounded 57 members of the 110-man Constabulary unit, including the British commander, Colonel Richard Corfield. In 1914, the British created the Somaliland Camel Corps to assist in maintaining order in British Somaliland. In 1920, the British launched their fifth and final expedition against Hassan and his followers. Employing the then-new technology of military aircraft, the British finally managed to quell Hassan's twenty-year-long struggle. The British tricked Hassan into preparing for an official visit, then launched bombing raids in the city of Taleh where most of his troops were stationed, causing the mullah to retreat into the desert. Hassan and his Dervish supporters fled to the Ogaden, where Hassan died in 1921.

== British Somaliland 1920–1960 ==
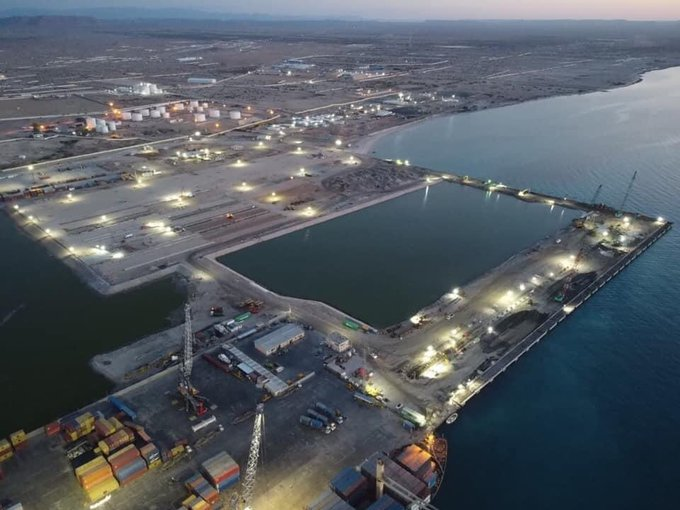
British modernized Berbera port with monetary exchange of goods that would pay in part for Somaliland Annual Protectorate Budgets in somaliland : By 1947, the entire annual administrative budget for British Somaliland was £213,139, with local customs revenue from Berbera port covering a portion of the costs and small British grants-in-aid covering the rest.£200,000 pounds is equivalent to 3 million dollars in 2000s.

Following the defeat of the Dervish resistance, the two fundamental goals of British policy in British Somaliland were the preservation of stability and the economic self-sufficiency of the protectorate. The second goal remained particularly elusive because of local resistance to taxation that might have been used to support the protectorate's administration. By the 1930s, the British presence had extended to other parts of British Somaliland. Growth in commercial trade motivated some livestock herders to subsequently leave the pastoral economy and settle in urban areas. Customs taxes also helped pay for British India's patrol of Somalia's Red Sea coast.

Sultans of the Isaaq clan in Hargeisa, Somaliland

Among military units in British Somaliland during the interwar period was a battalion of the Indian Army 4th Bombay Grenadiers.

=== Italian invasion ===
In August 1940, during the East African campaign in World War II, British Somaliland was invaded by Italy. The few British forces that were present attempted to defend the main road to Berbera, but were dislodged from their positions and retreated after losing the Battle of Tug Argan. During this period, the British rounded up soldiers and governmental officials to evacuate them from the territory through Berbera. In total, 7,000 people, including civilians, were evacuated. The Somalis serving in the Somaliland Camel Corps were given the choice of evacuation or disbandment; the majority chose to remain and were allowed to retain their arms.

In March 1941, after a six-month Italian occupation, British forces recaptured the protectorate during Operation Appearance. The final remnants of the Italian guerrilla movement discontinued all resistance in British Somaliland by the autumn of 1943.

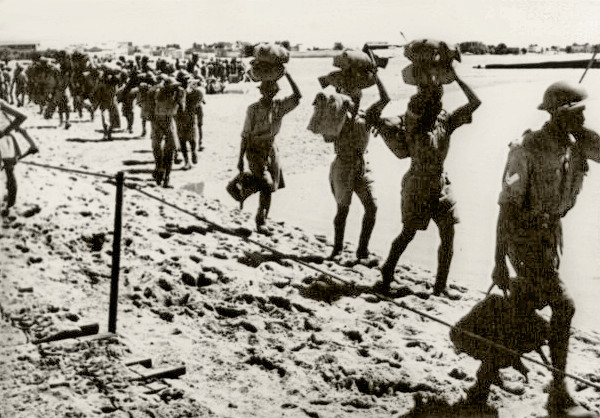
'Operation Appearance' British Indian Troops In Berbera. British led Military Action In British Somaliland to Remove Italian troops after invasion during WW2 which consisted of 2 battalions attached units 2 cruisers Ships 'HMS Glasgow' 'HMS Caledon' 2 Navy Ship destroyers 'HMS Kandahar' 'HMS Kingston' 2 auxiliary cruisers 'HMS Chakdina' 'HMS Chantala' 2 trawlers 2 transports Other Ship names 'S.S. Tuna' 'S.S. Beaconsfield' HMIS Netravati Army included South African, Indian, British, and Somaliland commandos from Aden.

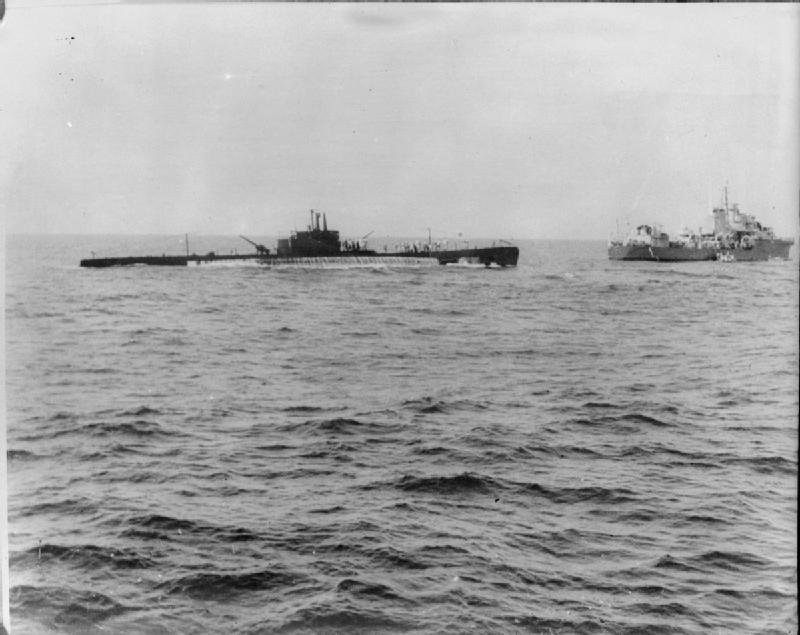
Italian Submarine Captured By HMS Kandahar in gulf of Aden 1940 Near British Somaliland

=== 1945 Sheikh Bashir rebellion ===
The 1945 Sheikh Bashir Rebellion was an uprising by tribesmen of the Habr Je'lo clan in the cities of Burao and Erigavo in the former British Somaliland protectorate against British authorities in July 1945 led by Sheikh Bashir, a Somali religious leader belonging to the Yeesif sub-division.

On 2 July, Sheikh Hamza collected 25 of his followers in the town of Wadamago and transported them on a lorry to the vicinity of Burao, where he distributed arms to half of his followers. On the evening of 3 July, the group entered Burao and opened fire on the police guard of the central prison in the city, which was filled with prisoners arrested for previous demonstrations. The group also attacked the house of the district commissioner of Burao District, Major Chambers, resulting in the death of Major Chamber's police guard. Hamza's group escaped to Bur Dhab, a strategic mountain south-east of Burao, where Sheikh Bashir's small unit occupied a fort and took up a defensive position in anticipation of a British counterattack.

The British campaign against Sheikh Hamza's troops proved abortive after several defeats as his forces kept on the move. No sooner had the expedition left the area, than the news travelled fast among the Somali nomads across the plain. The war had exposed the British administration to humiliation. The government came to a conclusion that another expedition against Hamza would be useless; that they must build a railway, make roads and effectively occupy the whole of the protectorate, or else abandon the interior. The latter course was decided upon and during the first months of 1945, the advance posts were withdrawn and the British administration confined to the coast town of Berbera.

Sheikh Bashir settled many disputes among the tribes in the vicinity, which kept them from raiding each other. He was generally thought to settle disputes through the use of Islamic Sharia and gathered around him a strong following.

Sheikh Bashir sent a message to the religious figures in the town of Erigavo, calling upon them to join the rebellion he led. The religious leaders, as well as the people of Erigavo, heeded his call. A substantial number of people armed themselves with rifles and spears to stage the revolt. The British authorities responded rapidly and severely, sending reinforcements to the town. In two "local actions", the British reinforcements fired openly against the armed mobs and arrested some minor religious leaders.

The British administration recruited Indian and South African troops to fight against Sheikh Bashir. Led by Police General James David, the British police force mobilized with intelligence plans to capture Bashir alive.

Eventually, on 7 July, they found Sheikh Bashir with his unit in defensive positions behind their fortifications in the mountains of Bur Dhab. After the clashes, Sheikh Bashir was killed, along with his second-in-command, Alin Yusuf Ali, nicknamed Qaybdiid. A third rebel was wounded and captured along with two other rebels. The rest of Bashir's people fled the fortifications and dispersed. On the British side, Police General James David perished. A number of Indian and South African troops also lost their lives, and a policeman was injured.

Despite the death of Sheikh Bashir and many of his followers, the resistance against British authorities continued in Somaliland, especially in Erigavo, where his death occurred. Further resistance arose in the town of Badhan leading to attacks on British colonial troops throughout the district and the seizing of arms from the rural constabulary.

Although most of the rebels had died, the British authorities were not finished with their counter-insurgency campaign. They quickly learned the identities of all the followers of Sheikh Bashir and tried to convince the locals to turn them in. When the locals refused, the authorities invoked the Collective Punishment Ordinance, under which the authorities seized and impounded a total of 6,000 camels owned by the Habr Je'lo, the clan that Sheikh Bashir belonged to. The British authorities made the return of the livestock dependent on the turning over and arrest of the escaped rebels. The remaining rebels were subsequently found and arrested, and transported to the Saad-ud-Din archipelago, off the coast of Zeila in northwestern Somaliland.

=== Independence and union with the Trust Territory of Somaliland ===
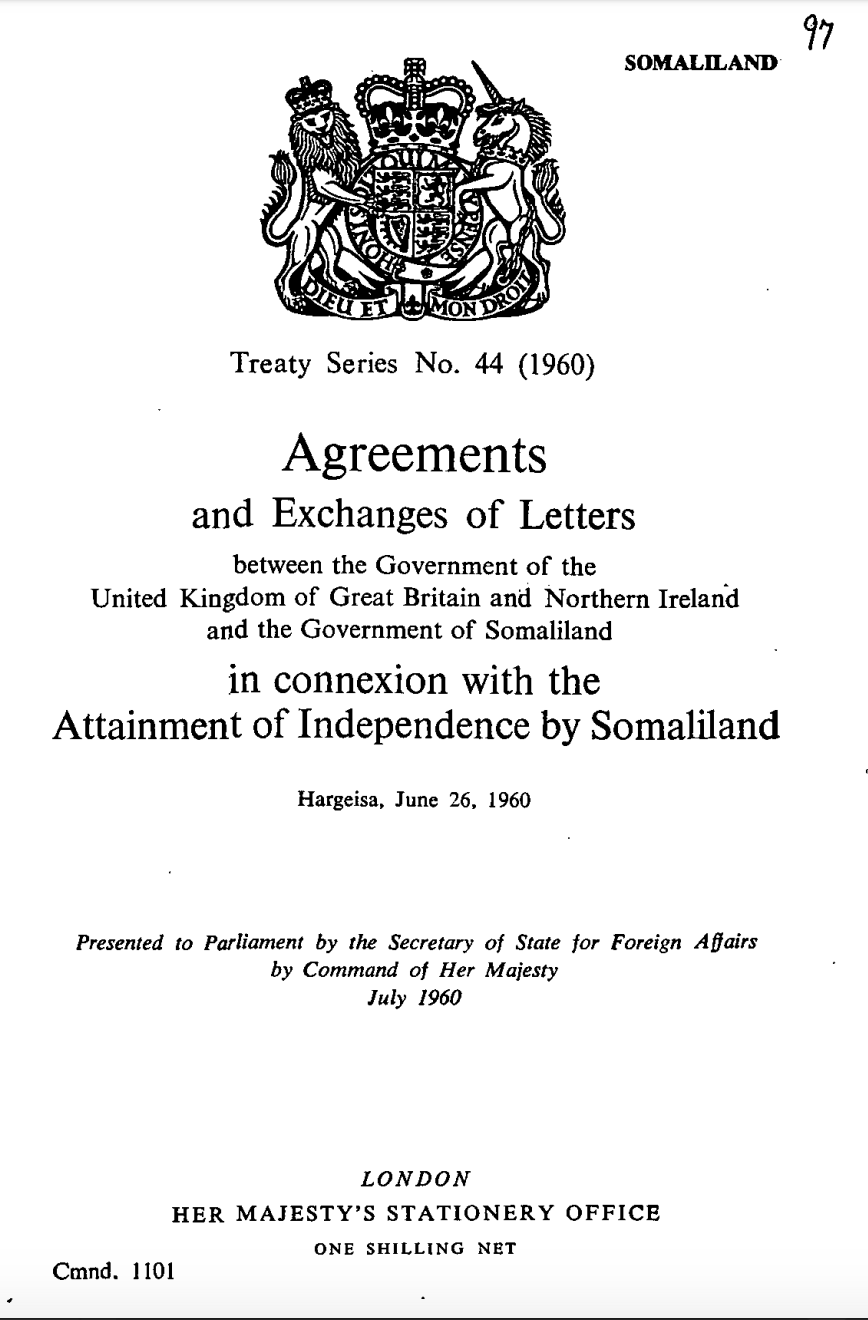
Agreements and Exchanges of Letters between the Government of the United Kingdom of Great Britain and Northern Ireland and the Government of Somaliland in connexion with the Attainment of Independence by Somaliland

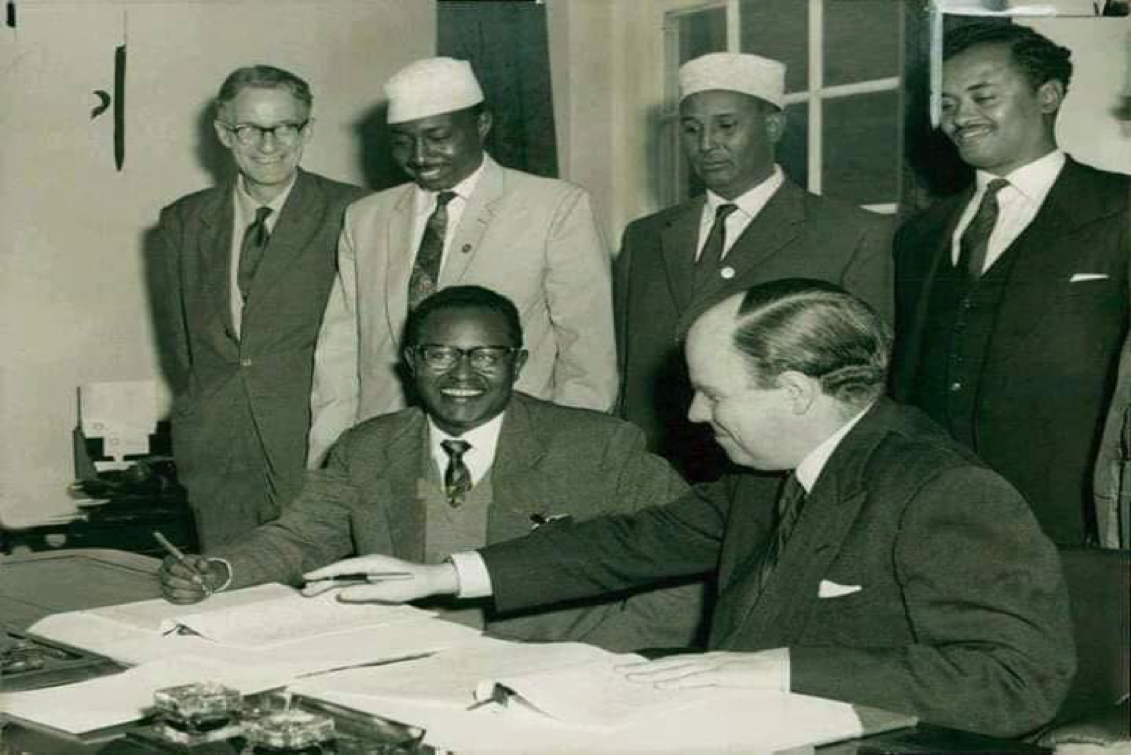
The Somaliland Protectorate Constitutional Conference, London, May 1960 in which it was decided that 26 June would be the day of Independence, and so signed on 12 May 1960. Somaliland Delegation: Mohamed Haji Ibrahim Egal, Ahmed Haji Dualeh, Ali Garad Jama and Haji Ibrahim Nur. From the Colonial Office: Ian Macleod, D. B. Hall, H. C. F. Wilks (Secretary)

In 1947, the entire budget for the administration of the British Somaliland protectorate was only £213,139.

In May 1960, the British Government stated that it would be prepared to grant independence to the then Somaliland protectorate. The Legislative Council of British Somaliland passed a resolution in April 1960 requesting independence. The legislative councils of the territory agreed to this proposal.

In April 1960, leaders of the two territories met in Mogadishu and agreed to form a unitary state. An elected president was to be head of state. Full executive powers would be held by a prime minister answerable to an elected National Assembly of 123 members representing the two territories.

On 26 June 1960, the British Somaliland protectorate gained independence as the State of Somaliland. Five days later, on 1 July 1960, Somaliland officially merged with the Trust Territory of Somaliland to create the Somali Republic.

On 1 July 1960 the legislature elected Haji Bashir, the old speaker of the Somaliland Assembly, as the first President of the new Republic of Somalia National Assembly, and also on that same day Aden Adde was elected as the President of the newly formed Somali Republic.

== Politics ==
Until 1898, Somaliland was administered by the British resident at Aden as a dependency of the Government of India. From 1898 it was under the purview of the Foreign Office, and from 1905 onward (with the exception of a period of military administration until 1948 following the Italian invasion) it was administered by the Colonial Office.

Until 1957, executive and legislative power were solely vested in the Governor, although he had a non-statutory council to advise him and in 1947, a Protectorate Advisory Council was established on a tribal basis, with representatives of other communities and official members as well. In 1957, a Legislative Council and an Executive Council were created. From 1959, there were elections to the Legislative Council. A new constitution was introduced in 1960, shortly before independence.

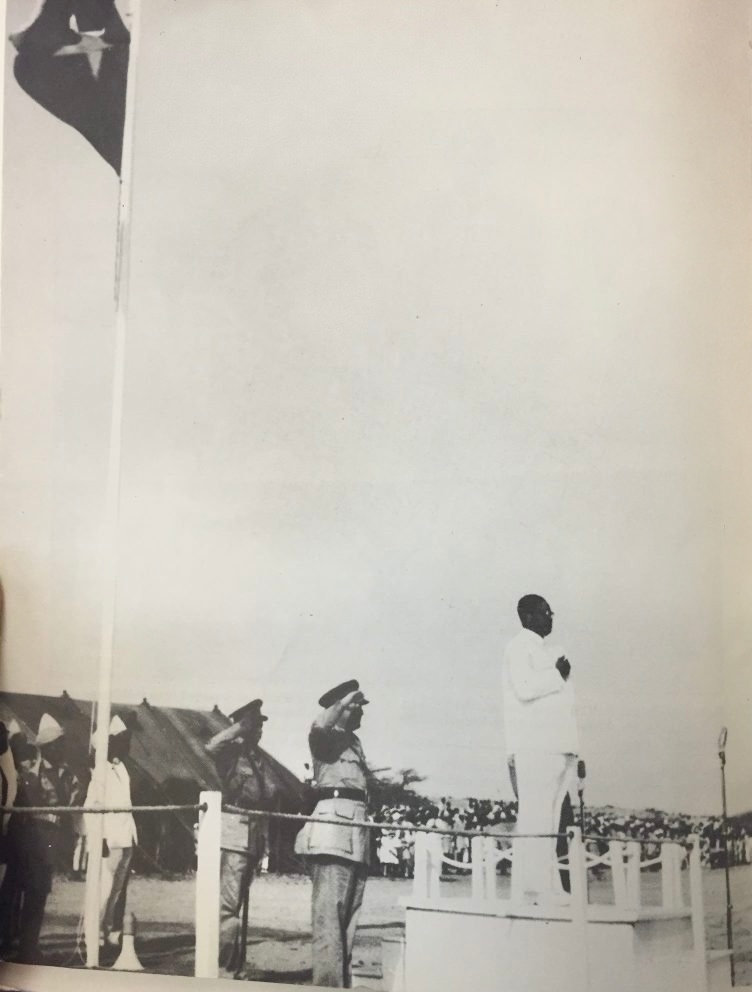
Somalilands Independence day 1960s Received brief recognition from 35 countries (including China, Israel, Egypt, and the Soviet Union) during its brief independent window

== Republic of Somaliland ==
In 1991, after a bloody civil war for independence in the northern part of the Somali Democratic Republic, the area which formerly encompassed British Somaliland declared independence. In May 1991, the formation of the "Republic of Somaliland" was proclaimed, with the local government regarding it as the successor to the former British Somaliland as well as to the State of Somaliland. However, as of 26 December 2025, Israel is the only United Nations member state that recognises the Republic of Somaliland as an independent sovereign state.

== Postage stamps ==
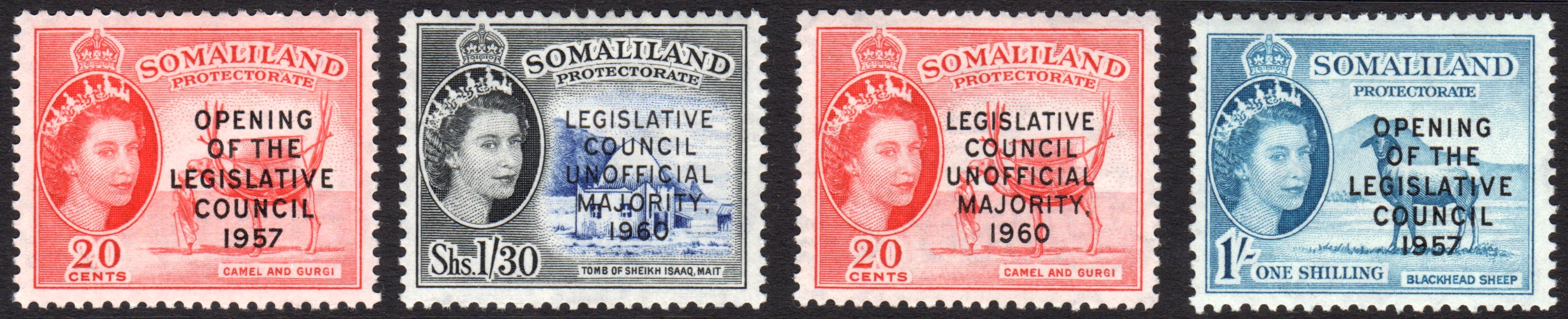
Stamps of the Somaliland Protectorate, 1953 issue. Overprinted in 1957 and 1960 to mark events relating to the Legislative Council

== See Also ==
- French Somaliland
- Aden Colony
