= Central Africa Regiment =

African military unit

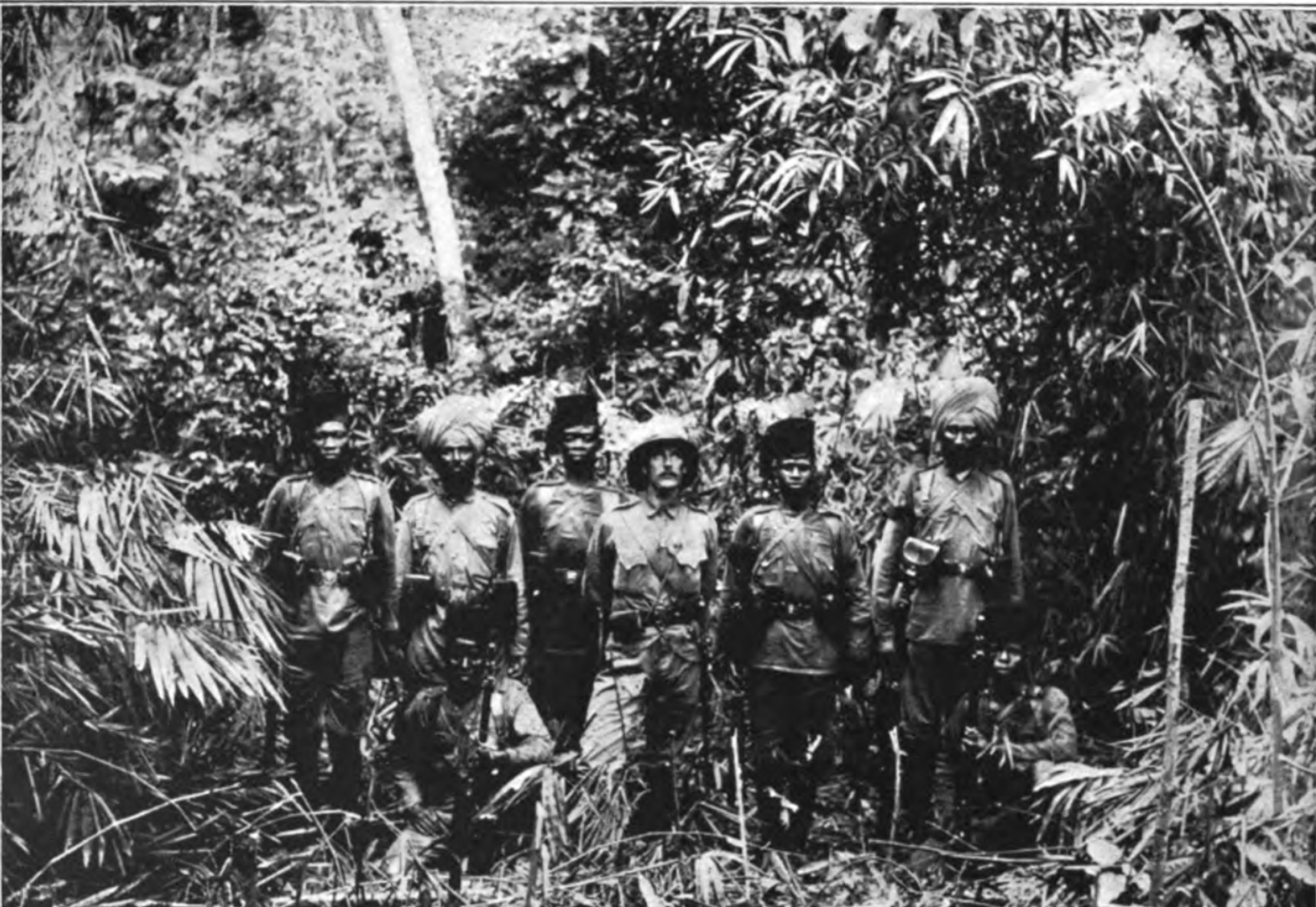
- A detachment of the second battalion during the War of the Golden Stool
- Active: 1896–1902
- Allegiance: British Central Africa Protectorate
- Branch: Army
- Type: Infantry
- Size: 1 to 2 battalions
- Engagements: Somaliland campaign; War of the Golden Stool

Commanders
- Notable commanders: Alfred Sharpe; Willoughby Verner

The Central Africa Regiment was the infantry regiment of the British Central Africa Protectorate, modern-day Malawi. Founded as the British Central African Rifles in 1896, the force was renamed two years later, removing the word British from the title to become the Central African Rifles and, in 1899, the Central Africa Regiment. It was led by European officers, supported by Sikh non-commissioned officers, both often with experience from the Indian Army. The majority of the force came from the Chewa, Ngoni, Tonga and Yao populations of the protectorate, allocated to companies based on their ethnic identity. Most soldiers wore a khaki uniform with a black fez on active duty and some parades, otherwise wearing a blue uniform with a red fez. The regimental band wore bright yellow trousers, which led to its members being known as the "canary birds".

The unit served solely in the protectorate as a single battalion until 1899, when a second battalion was added to the regiment to serve abroad. After an initial deployment to Mauritius, the battalion served in the Somaliland campaign against the Dervish fighters of Muḥammad ibn 'Abdallāh Hassan. Half of the battalion was deployed, alongside a contingent of the First Battalion, to the Gold Coast to participate in the War of the Golden Stool against the Asante Empire, and the other half were sent to suppress an uprising in the Gambia Colony and Protectorate. The regiment was successful in defeating the enemy each time with minimal casualties. In 1901, a contingent of the regiment were the first Malawians to travel to England. They met Edward VII, who presented them with medals for their service in combat. During the following year, the regiment was merged into the King's African Rifles, forming the first and second battalions of the new regiment.

== Background ==
British missionaries established their first operations in the area around Lake Malawi in 1875, and initially all interactions with the local people were peaceful. In 1888, the African Lakes Company set out to stop the activities of the slave trader Mlozi bin Kazbadema, who operated from Karonga. It raised an armed force in Blantyre under the command of Frederick Lugard, which successfully defeated Mlozi in the Karonga War. Following the foundation of the British Central Africa Protectorate, in 1891, the new commissioner Harry Johnston brought an Indian contingent from the Hyderabad Lancers to form the kernel of a more permanent force. In 1893, an African force was deployed in Liwonde, and was raised again the following year, again as irregulars, to quell insurgency in the area. At this point the force consisted of three British officers, 200 Sikh non-commissioned officers transferred from the Indian Army, 150 African soldiers on longer-term contract and a variable number of Africans serving on temporary assignment. In 1895, after defeating Yao forces led by Kawinga, Matapwiri and Zarafi, the force attacked Mozi's base on 1 December. He was captured and executed.

At that time, most of the African troops that served in the British force were from Mozambique and Zanzibar. Apart from a small number of the Tonga converts to Christianity that defended some of the Christian missions, local troops served only in a ceremonial capacity. This was deemed insufficient, the government of the British Central Africa Protectorate seeing a clear need for a permanent armed force that included both local soldiers and recruits from other parts of the British Empire, particularly in light of increasingly frequent incursions from German East Africa.

== History ==
=== Foundation ===
The British Central African Rifles was founded in 1896 with an initial strength of 738 African and 175 Sikh troops. The soldiers were led by four officers acting as command staff, six company officers, a quartermaster and a sergeant major of artillery. The regiment's primary roles were to police the protectorate and defend the British political and economic interests in the country. The force grew quickly to six companies: A Company and B Company stationed in Zomba, C Company at Mulanje, D Company in Mangochi, E Company at Fort Maguire on Lake Malawi, and F Company in Fort Alston, Nkhotakota. In August 1897, Johnston's replacement as commissioner, Alfred Sharpe, commanded a force of four European officers, 50 Sikh soldiers, four companies, each of 100 African troops, and a 7-pound mountain gun over the border into Portuguese Mozambique. The force attacked the Lomwe people, capturing Chief Sirumba and gaining agreement from the people for compensation for goods stolen from those under British protection. In the fight, Sharpe commended the African troops as "the best skirmishers he had seen". In December, the regiment crossed into the north-eastern part of the land of the Mthwakazi to attack the forces under the command of Mpezeni and Mombera, chiefs of the Ngoni people.

On 17 January the following year, the regiment successfully defeated the Ngoni force in a single battle. Later in the year, a force of two European officers, ten Sikhs and seventy troops was deployed against Kazembe. Equipped with a Maxim gun and a 7-pound mountain gun, the force destroyed the stockade and, again, negotiated favourable terms with the chief. At the same time, an agreement with the British South Africa Company was signed to pay £8,000 (equivalent to £1,146,549 in 2023) annually to the British Central Africa Protectorate for a force of 40 Sikh and 350 African troops to be available to quell any rebellions in the country. The payment was later increased to £10,000 (equivalent to £1,433,186 in 2023) and proved particularly favourable to the Central African Rifles as, not only were their troops never called on to fight, but they attracted recruits from the local Bemba people.

"British" was removed from the title in 1898, the force being renamed the Central African Rifles. The company based at Fort Alston was moved to Fort Manning on the border with the emerging protectorate of North-Eastern Rhodesia. The new base was better equipped than the others, having more troops and a gun detachment. A new base was also formed at Fort Lister near Mulanje. Unlike the other companies, this fort relied on soldiers enlisted from Portuguese Mozambique.

=== Operations outside the protectorate ===
Central Africa Regiment: points of interest

In 1899, the unit was expanded with a second battalion, formed primarily to allow the regiment to serve outside the protectorate. The two battalions were also known as the First and Second Central African Rifles. The new battalion was soon given its first overseas assignment, being sent to Mauritius to act as a garrison force. Eight companies were sent, totalling seven European officers, 32 Sikhs and 878 African soldiers, accompanied by 220 wives and 77 children. The deployment was a failure due to abuse from the local population and outbreaks of bronchitis and pneumonia amongst the troops, their wives and their children, blamed on warm clothing not being issued. Nearly 30 of the contingent died. Despite this, as Sharpe remarked, the soldiers maintained "remarkable discipline." On 5 July, Queen Victoria declared that the regiment be named the Central Africa Regiment. On 1 August, Colonel Willoughby Verner led a detachment of the First Battalion in what was termed the Anglo-Portuguese Nquamba and Mataka Expedition. The force of ten British officers, 135 Sikhs, 500 African soldiers, a Maxim gun and two 7-pound guns was deployed alongside Portuguese troops against the Yao chief Mataka. Although mainly acting in support of the Portuguese, it was the Central Africa Regiment that burnt the town of Nquamba.

At the same time, the British Empire increasingly saw the Mullah of Somaliland, Muḥammad ibn 'Abdallāh Hassan, as a threat. He was declared an outlaw; his Dervish fighters attacked Indian merchants, and he stated that would "drive the British back into the sea whence they had come". The Second Battalion was transferred from Mauritius to Somaliland, the first detachment arriving in Berbera at the end of February 1900. The climate in Somaliland proved beneficial to the troops, and they quickly recovered and trained. On 15 June, the battalion was made aware that a French supply caravan, disguised as a shooting expedition, had left Djibouti with arms for the Dervishes. A force of 60 soldiers of B Company surprised and captured the party, scoring the first operational success for the Second Battalion.

Meanwhile, there had erupted a conflict between the British Empire and the Asante Empire in what became the War of the Golden Stool. On 19 June, a contingent of four officers, 73 Sikh troops and 276 African soldiers of the First Battalion, along with a medical officer, hospital and machine gun detachment, departed from Zomba, embarking on the transport Victorian on 30 June with 750 carriers. On 9 July, it was also decided to send half the Second Battalion to the conflict. The force, including 70 Sikh and 200 African troops, sailed via Cape Town on 11 July to West Africa. The four companies arrived at the former slave station Cape Coast Castle on 12 August.

On 13 August, two companies, joining troops of the West African Rifles and supported by two 7-pound mountain guns, marched for Kumasi, arriving the following day. The force successfully defeated the Asante troops at the stockade, the regiment suffering seventeen wounded. The Sikh troops were particularly praised for their bravery by the British command, From there, the British force, including the Second Battalion, marched to Esumeja to defeat the Asante army commanded by Queen Yaa Asantewaa, but the leaders fled or surrendered as they advanced. A large detachment of four companies, 70 Sikh and 200 African soldiers, of the First Battalion arrived on 20 August. Together, these forces undertook forays into nearby towns and villages, including the religious centre of Ejisu, that routed the remaining Asante fighters. Following the defeat and death of the Asante leader Opoto on 23 August, on 1 September the advance to Kumasi was complete. The battalion's A Company was the first to reach the capital. The battalion fought in the battle of Obassa on 30 September, achieving a decisive victory that led to the end of the war.

Back in British Somaliland, in mid-September, while on patrol near the Ethiopian border, a contingent of the regiment under Lieutenant Colonel J. S. Graham observed the Mullah in camp unprepared. However, in honour of an agreement not to cross the border, they did not attack. On 4 October, the Yao of the Central Africa Regiment were the only force of the British flank that stood their ground in a battle in Mudug. This proved critical to the battle, which finished with a British victory.

By December 1900, the deployment of the Second Battalion in British Somaliland had mainly ceased. The remaining half of the Second Battalion departed Somalia for the Gambia Colony and Protectorate. An uprising in the colony had started on 14 June following the deaths of two British officials in Sankandi. On 2 January 1901, the force arrived and were accommodated at Bathhurst, present-day Banjul, on 10 January. On the following day, two companies of the battalion participated in the successful capture of Dumbutu, suffering casualties of two wounded soldiers in the fight, and, on 15 February, three companies were deployed to Fogny and Kombo, meeting no resistance. Subsequently, the soldiers were deployed to villages along the frontier. This campaign was the only time that troops of the regiment were commanded by naval officers. Following a successful campaign, on 30 March, the companies returned to the Gold Coast and were reunited with the remainder of the Second Battalion.

In June that year, a detachment of one Sikh and twenty African troops, including six sergeants, three corporals, twelve privates and an interpreter, travelled to England. They were inspected by the Commander-in-Chief of the Forces, Frederick Roberts, and were presented to Edward VII at Marlborough House, who bestowed them with the Ashanti Medal and Africa General Service Medal for their service in the war with the Asante and in the Gambia. This was the first visit by Malawians to England.

On 1 January 1902, the regiment was merged with the East Africa Rifles and Uganda Rifles to form the King's African Rifles. The two battalions of the Central Africa Regiment became the 1st and 2nd Battalion.

== Description ==
=== Local recruitment ===
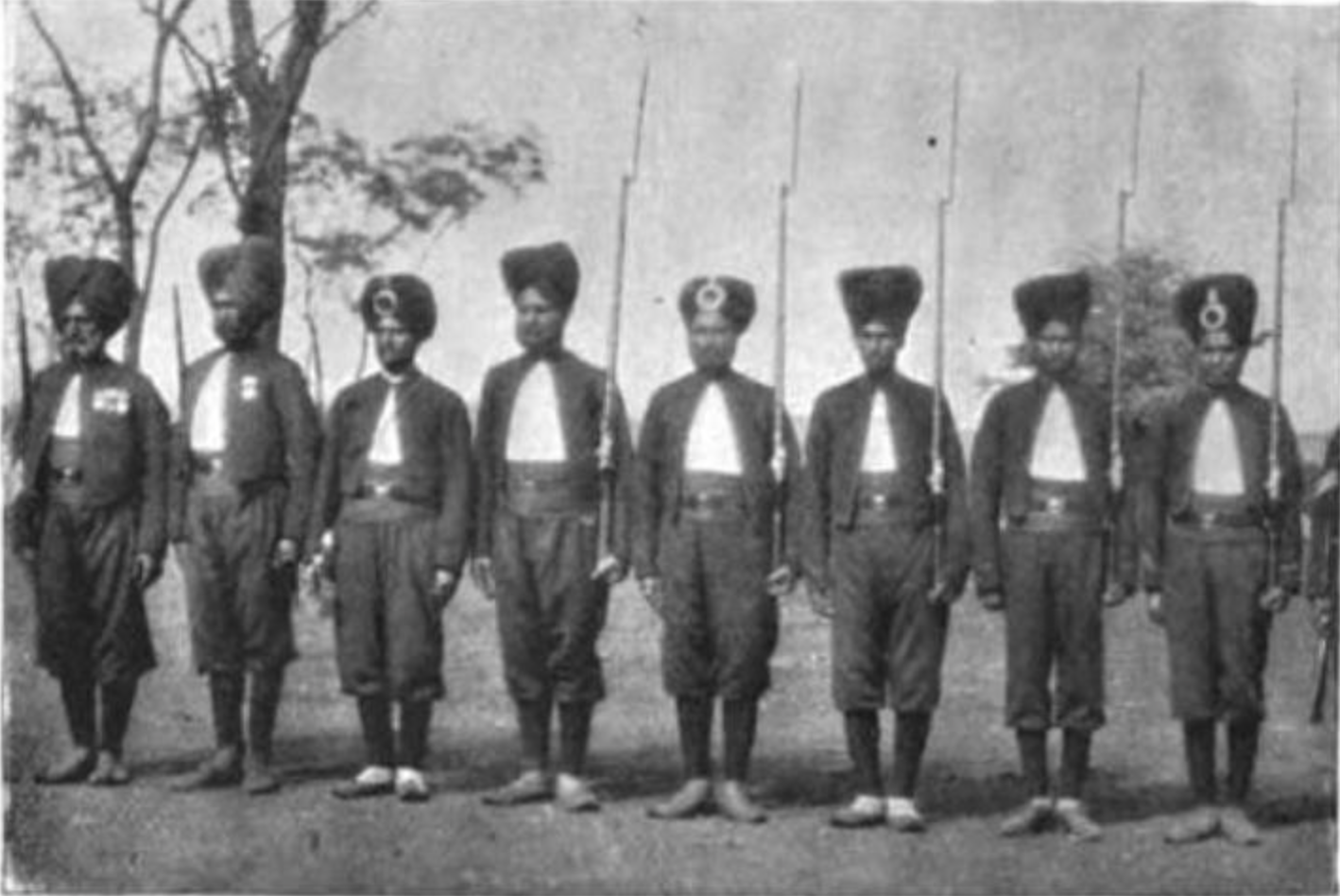
Sikh members of the regiment in 1898

The British had gained much experience with the use of non-British troops across the empire by the time of the foundation of the Central Africa Regiment, particularly in the conquest of India and the foundation of the British Raj. The use of companies of different ethnic groups, serving out of the native territories, had become well tested. The emerging territory of British Central Africa contained many different ethnic groups and the British decided to found companies based on ethnic lines. It was hoped that this would foster comradeship in the unit, encourage competition between units and also reduce the risk of different ethnic groups combining against their colonial rulers. The original structure of the force had envisioned three of the initial six companies coming from the Tonga due to their longer experience of British culture via missionaries. This did not come to pass. Although a small cohort joined in 1895 as regular troops, they only signed up for a year and for local service. Instead, the majority of the first recruits were Yao, with 50 enlisting in that year alongside 25 Chewa. They signed up for three years of service.

The Tonga were generally more educated, and so the more aspirational members of the community served in administrative positions in the government rather than join the army. At the same time, the lack of plantations in the Yao territories meant that they had more freedom to move and so could more easily enlist. The collapse of the chiefdoms amongst the Yao had also led to the release of a large number of trained musketeers that were looking for work and who were particularly attracted to a career in the nascent army.

=== Commissioned and non-commissioned officers ===
Initially, there was no recruitment of officers and non-commissioned officers for the Central African Rifles from the local people. Leadership was recruited from amongst the experienced officers of the Indian Army. All the officers came from Europe and the non-commissioned officers came from Europe and India. Initially, each company was commanded by a British officer and had a Sikh colour sergeant, with three to four Sikhs taking on leadership of a section, which each contained a number of African troops, the remaining one filling the role of drill sergeant. Sikhs also fulfilled other roles, including quartermaster. Although the language barrier could have caused problems, this was overcome by what historian Colin Baker calls, based on the testimonies of John Gough and Claude Percival, captains that served in the Rifles, "the keenness of the Malawian soldiers to excel." The officers were also often those that had served in active roles in the Indian Army, particularly at Zomba.

In October 1898, this situation changed. Following an unsuccessful counterattack following a raid that led to twenty Malawian women and children civilians being abducted, the regiment decided that it would no longer be necessary to have a Sikh leading a section. The standing order requiring a Sikh to accompany any troop of the Central Africa Regiment in service was cancelled, and African soldiers were promoted to non-commissioned ranks. It was thought that a company that only consisted of African troops was more mobile, a proposition immediately vindicated as the company based in Mangoche, where the cancellation initially applied, swiftly overtook the raiders and rescued the captives. Non-commissioned officers were recruited from the sons of chiefs and other leaders and increasingly also took on the role of instructors from their Sikh colleagues.

At the same time, the balance in the African troops had changed. Initially the regiment consisted of six companies; A Company, D Company and E Company were nominally recruited from the Tonga, B Company and C Company were Yao and F Company was a combination of Chewa and Ngoni. Conditions of service were initially limited to the protectorate, but, in 1898, this was altered and up to two years could be spent abroad. By this time the number of companies had increased to eight, with G Company another Tonga company and H Company consisting of Yao soldiers.

=== Uniform and equipment ===
Initial recruits had a uniform that followed the standard of the Indian Army, which consisted of a turban, white shirt, cut-away open-fronted jacket, cummerbund, knickerbockers and puttees. The English officers were kitted out in red and the Indians in yellow. The jacket was replaced by a loose khaki shirt when on active service. Each of the other ranks was issued with two uniforms. For commanding officer's parades and military action, the soldiers wore a khaki coat, loose khaki shorts, blue puttees and a black fez, which had a tassel. This was renewed every year. For other purposes, a blue cotton uniform was provided with a red fez at enlistment. Any damage to this was the responsibility of the soldier. They were also provided with brown belts, two pouches, a khaki rucksack and a water bottle. The soldiers of the Central Africa Regiment were called "the smartest and most soldier-like body of men" of those serving in the west coast of Africa by the Governor of the Gambia, George Chardin Denton. The regiment had a contingent of musicians that played the drums and fife, known as the "canary birds" after their uniform of bright yellow trousers.

The troops were originally issued with Snider–Enfield rifles, but, in 1899, these were replaced with the Martini–Enfield. Although a superior weapon, its use initially led to a drop in accuracy as the soldiers found it hard to adapt to the smokeless powder it used. By 1902, with training and experience, the soldiers were proving more accurate, and the use of the Martini–Enfield was deemed, in the words of Captain Gough, an "unqualified success". During the War of the Golden Stool, the soldiers fixed bayonets to their rifles and used these to charge the enemy, which was often sufficient to break the Asante line and cause them to retreat without a shot being fired.

=== Life in the army ===
Discipline in the army was harsh, and flogging was common. Although corporal punishment had been banned across most European armies, it was still considered acceptable to flog African troops. Unlike in many contemporary armies, the soldiers were allowed to bring wives and children with them within the garrison, married men receiving private quarters while the rest slept in dormitories. This was considered particularly favourable, as traditionally a man had to ask permission of the elders to marry, which could be circumvented if the man married while a serving soldier. The policy was to rarely move officers so they understood the local conditions well and invested in their quarters to make them as comfortable as they could. The regiment achieved a high level of cohesion and operational efficiency in the battlefield, particularly under fire. In a 1900 report to Reuters, the regimental medical officer Douglas Gray said, "The Central African Rifles never wavered in the slightest degree" and "constitute one of the most highly-trained and well-disciplined native forces in the empire".

== Summary of name changes ==
- 1896 – British Central African Rifles.
- 1898 – Central African Rifles.
- 1899 – Central Africa Regiment.
- 1900 – 1st and 2nd Central African Rifles.
- 1902 – 1st and 2nd Battalion King's African Rifles.
