= African Rifles =

African Rifles may refer to:

- The King's African Rifles (KAR), a multi-battalion British colonial regiment raised from the various British possessions in East Africa, created in 1902
- The East African Rifles, a British unit created in 1895 that was later merged into the KAR in 1902
- The East African Mounted Rifles, a volunteer unit of white Africans during the First World War, created in 1914
- The Rhodesian African Rifles or (RAR), the second-oldest regiment in the Rhodesian Army, created in 1940
- The Royal African Rifles, a 1953 adventure film
- The Victoria Pioneer Rifle Corps, all-black militia unit formed in 1860 within the British Colony of British Columbia
