= Amalgamation House =

Historic government building Akwa Ibom, Nigeria

Coordinates: 4°34′11″N 7°32′49″E

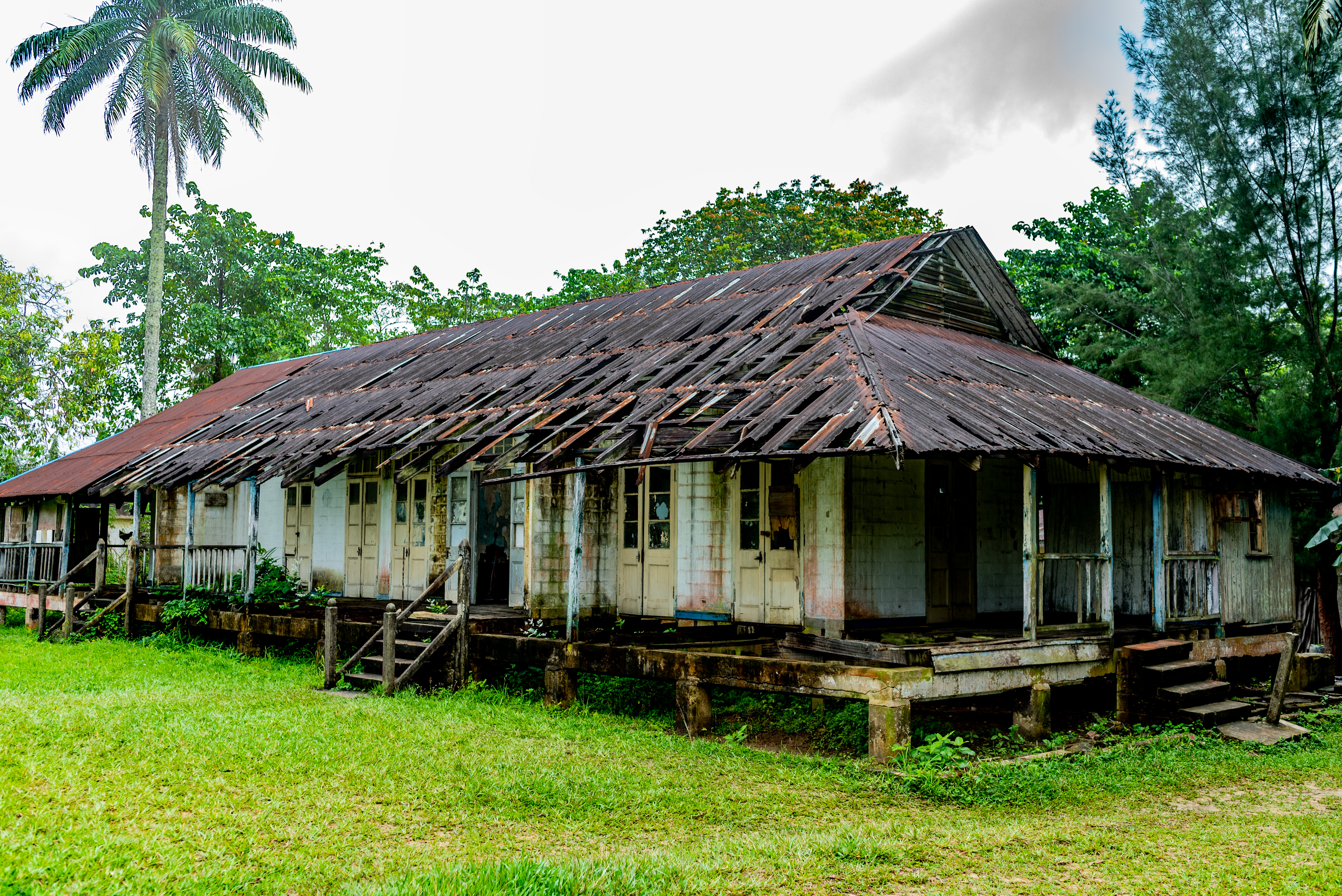
The Amalgamation House

The Amalgamation House, also called the Amalgamation Building, is a single-story colonial-era historic structure located on Marina Road in Ikot Abasi, Akwa Ibom State, Nigeria. Constructed of wood, brick, and corrugated iron, it is the site where Lord Frederick Lugard, 1st Baron Lugard amalgamated the Northern and Southern Protectorates in 1914.

== Gallery ==
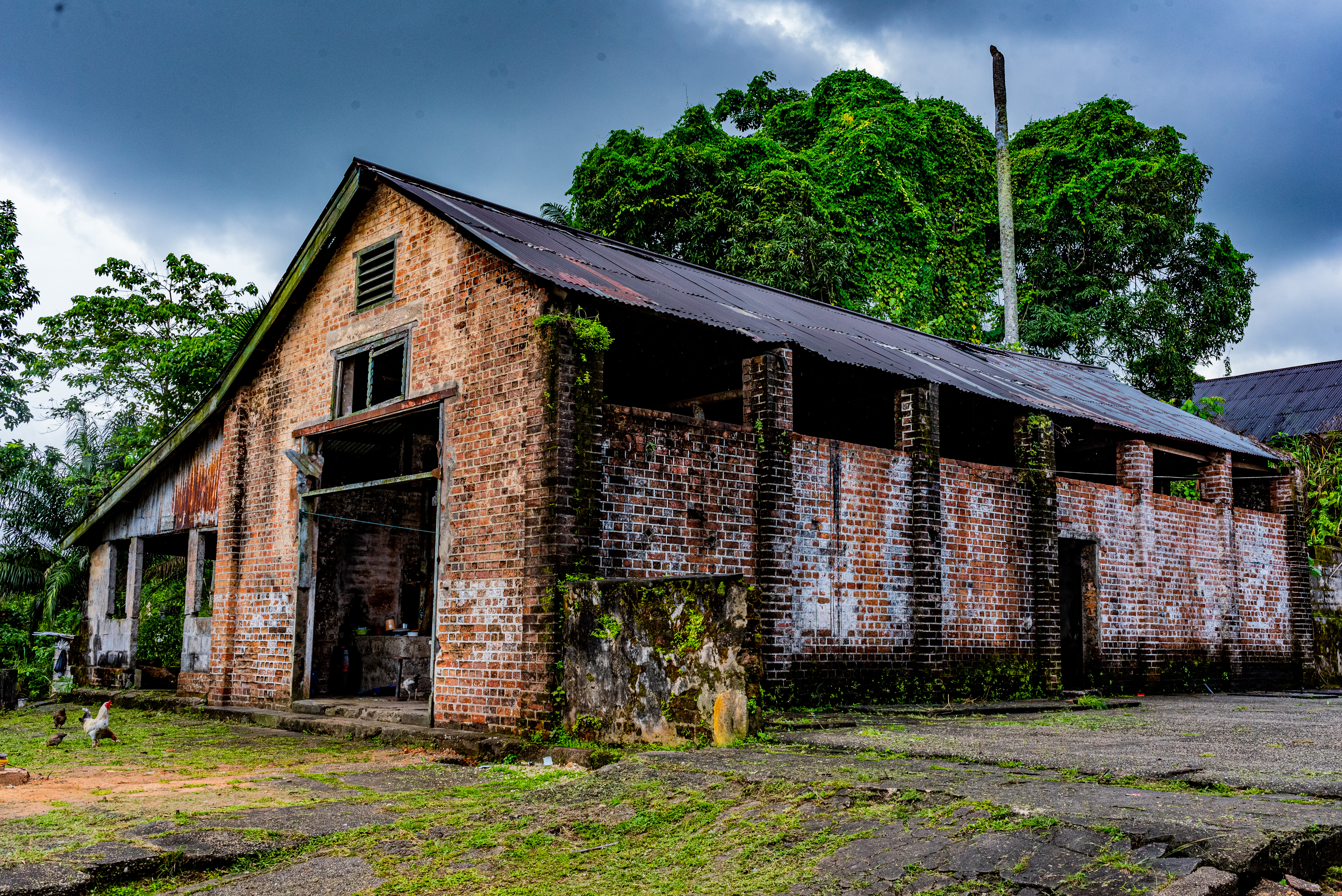
House where the slaves were marked

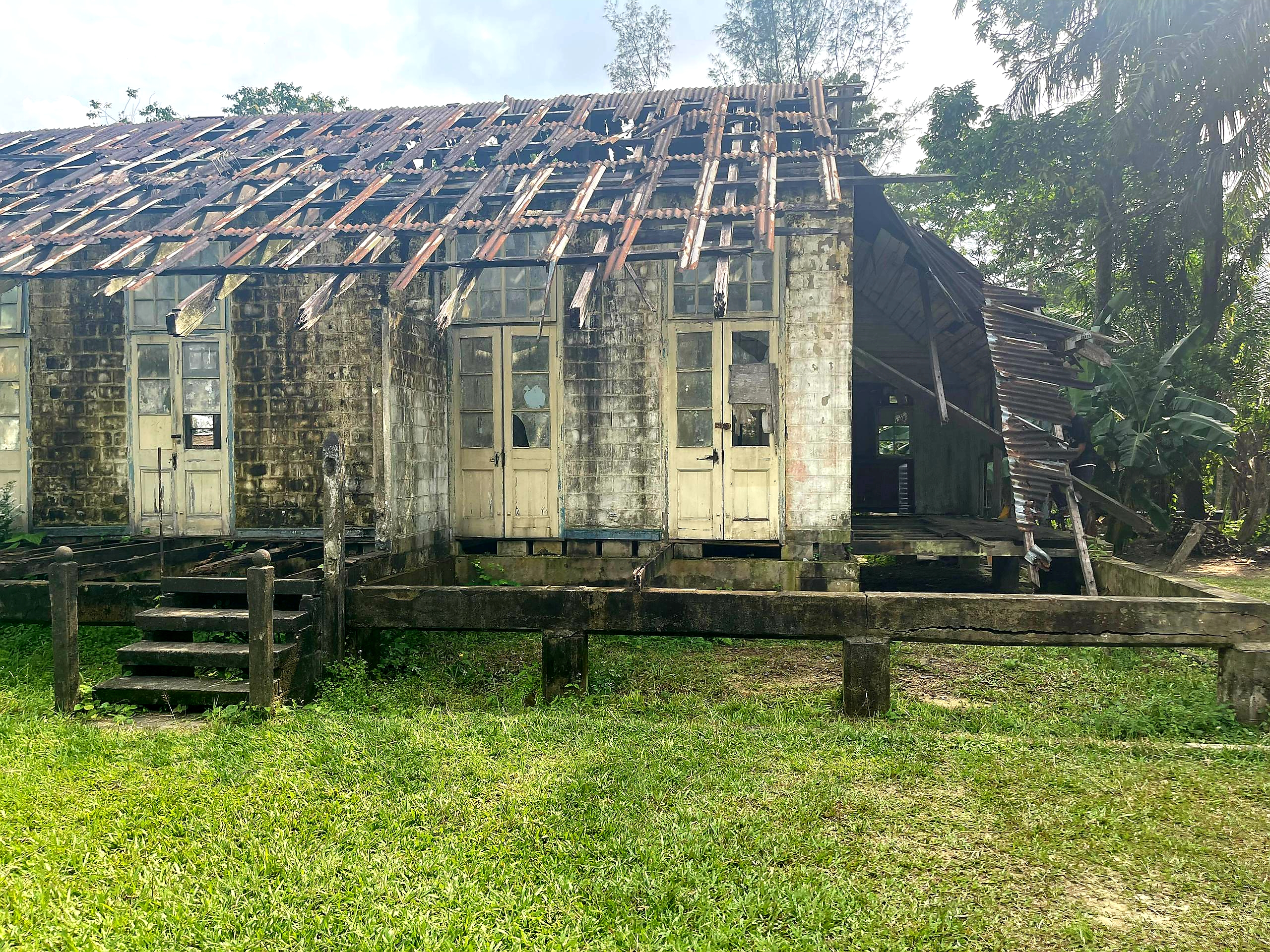
Amalgamation House, where the northern and southern protectorates were united

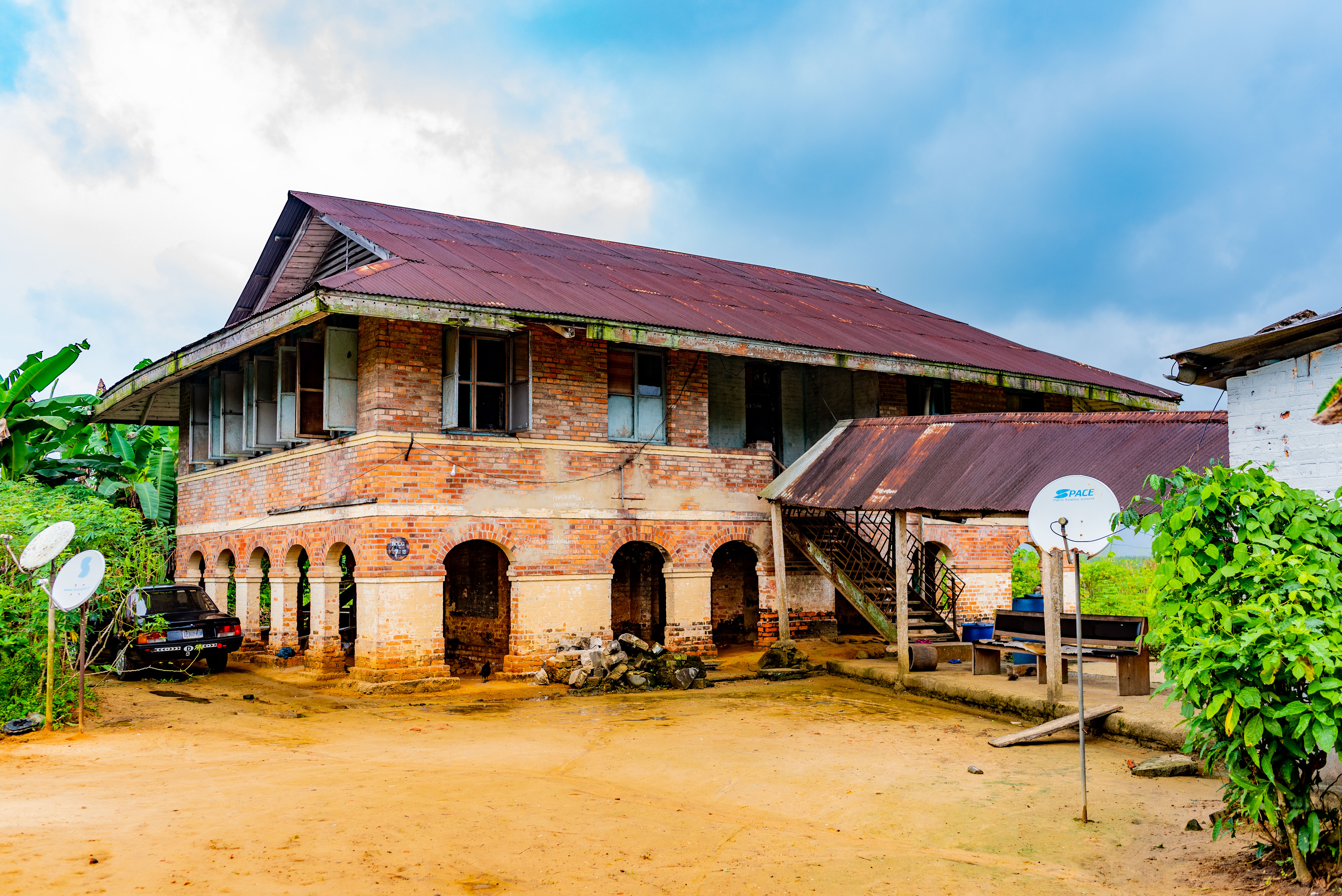
Residential house of the southern Governor Frederick Luggard
