= Frederick Lugard, 1st Baron Lugard =

British colonial administrator (1858–1945)

The Right Honourable The Lord Lugard GCMG CB DSO PC
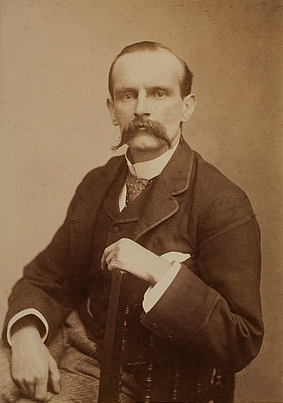
- Lugard, 1880–1886

Governor-General of Nigeria
- In office 1 January 1914 – 8 August 1919
- Preceded by: Office created
- Succeeded by: Sir Hugh Clifford (as Governor)

Governor of the Northern Nigeria Protectorate
- In office September 1912 – 1 January 1914
- Preceded by: Charles Lindsay Temple (acting)
- Succeeded by: Office abolished

Governor of the Southern Nigeria Protectorate
- In office September 1912 – 1 January 1914
- Preceded by: Sir Walter Egerton
- Succeeded by: Office abolished

14th Governor of Hong Kong
- In office 29 July 1907 – 16 March 1912
- Monarchs: Edward VII; George V
- Colonial Secretary: Sir Francis Henry May; Warren Delabere Barnes; Sir Claud Severn
- Preceded by: Sir Matthew Nathan
- Succeeded by: Sir Francis Henry May

High Commissioner of the Northern Nigeria Protectorate
- In office 6 January 1900 – September 1906
- Preceded by: Office created
- Succeeded by: Sir William Wallace (acting)

Personal details
- Born: 22 January 1858 Madras, British India
- Died: 11 April 1945 (aged 87) Dorking, Surrey, England
- Spouse: Flora Louise Shaw (m. 1902; died 1929)
- Education: Royal Military College, Sandhurst
- Profession: Soldier, explorer, colonial administrator

Military service
- Allegiance: Great Britain
- Branch/service: British Army
- Years of service: 1878–1919
- Rank: Major
- Battles/wars: Second Anglo-Afghan War; Mahdist War; Third Anglo-Burmese War; Karonga War; World War I

Chinese name
- Traditional Chinese: 盧吉
- Simplified Chinese: 卢吉
Transcriptions
Yue: Cantonese
- Jyutping: lou4 gat1

Frederick John Dealtry Lugard, 1st Baron Lugard GCMG CB DSO PC (22 January 1858 – 11 April 1945), known as Sir Frederick Lugard between 1901 and 1928, was a British soldier, explorer of Africa and colonial administrator. He was Governor of Hong Kong (1907–1912), the last Governor of Southern Nigeria Protectorate (1912–1914), the first High Commissioner (1900–1906), the last Governor (1912–1914) of Northern Nigeria Protectorate and the first Governor-General of Nigeria (1914–1919).

== Early life and education ==
Lugard was born in Madras (now Chennai), India, but was brought up in Worcester, England. He was the son of the Reverend Frederick Gruber Lugard, a British Army chaplain at Madras, and his third wife, Mary Howard (1819–1865), the youngest daughter of Reverend John Garton Howard (1786–1862), a younger son of landed gentry from Thorne and Melbourne, near York. His paternal uncle was Sir Edward Lugard, Adjutant-General in India from 1857 to 1858 and Permanent Under-Secretary of State for War at the War Office from 1861 to 1871. Lugard was educated at Rossall School and Royal Military College, Sandhurst. The name 'Dealtry' was in honour of Thomas Dealtry, a friend of his late father.

== Military career ==
Lugard was commissioned into the 9th Foot (East Norfolk Regiment) in 1878 and joined the second battalion in India. He served in the Second Anglo-Afghan War (1878–1880), the Sudan campaign (1884–1885) and the Third Anglo-Burmese War (November 1885) and was awarded the Distinguished Service Order in 1887. His career was derailed when he fell in love with a twice-married British divorcee he had met in India. Learning she had been injured in an accident, he abandoned his post in Burma to join her in Lucknow and followed her to England. When she rejected him, Lugard decided to make a fresh start in Africa.

=== Karonga War ===
Around 1880, a group of Swahili traders, under Mlozi bin Kazbadema, established trading bases in the north-western sector of Lake Malawi, including a stockade at Chilumba, on the lake, from which ivory and slaves could be shipped across the lake. In 1883 the African Lakes Company set up a base in Karonga to exchange ivory for trade goods from the Swahili merchants.

Relations between the two groups deteriorated, partly because of the company's delays or unwillingness to provide guns, ammunition and other trade goods and also because the Swahili traders turned more to slaving and attacking communities that the company had promised to protect. Hostilities broke out in mid-1887. The series of intermittent armed clashes that took place up to mid-1889 is known as the Karonga War or sometimes the "Arab War".

The African Lakes Company depot at Karonga was evacuated at the end of the year, but in May 1888, Captain Lugard, persuaded by the British Consul at Mozambique, arrived to lead an expedition against Mlozi, sponsored by the African Lakes Company but without official support from the British government.

Lugard's first expedition of May to June 1888 attacked the Swahili stockades with limited success, and in the course of one attack, he was wounded and withdrew southward. Lugard's second expedition in December 1888 to March 1889 was larger and included a 7-pounder gun, which, however, failed to breach the stockade walls. Following the second failure, Lugard left the Lake Malawi region for Britain in April 1889.

== Exploration of East Africa ==
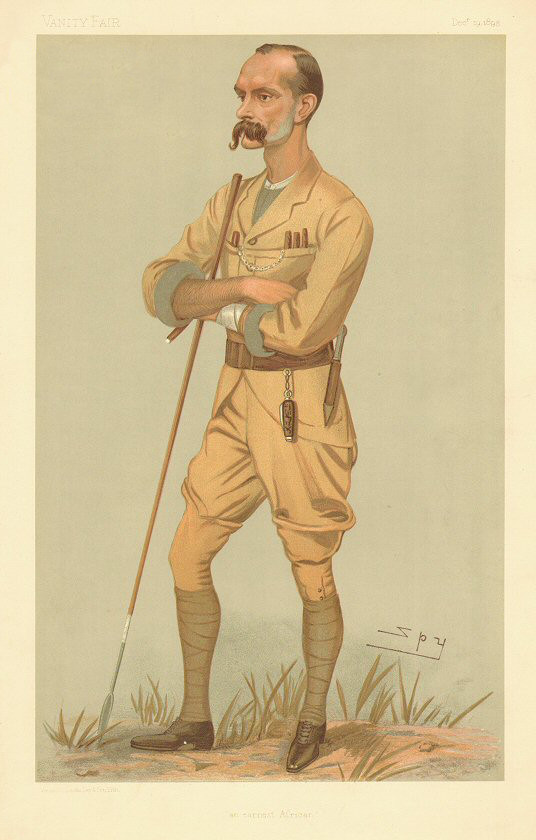
Lugard caricatured by Spy for Vanity Fair, 1895

After leaving Nyasaland in April 1889, Lugard accepted a position with the Imperial British East Africa Company (IBEAC) and arrived in Mombasa, on the coast of East Africa, in December. A year earlier, in 1888, the IBEAC had been granted a royal charter by Queen Victoria to colonise the "British sphere of influence" between Zanzibar and Uganda and wanted to open a trading route between Lake Victoria, in Uganda, and the coastal port of Mombasa. The first interior trading post was established at Machakos, 240 miles in from the coast, but the established traditional route to Machakos was a treacherous journey through the large Taru Desert, 93 miles of scorching dust bowl.

Lugard's first mission was to determine the feasibility of a route from Mombasa to Machakos that would bypass the Taru Desert. He explored the Sabaki River and the neighbouring region, in addition to elaborating a scheme for the emancipation of the slaves held by Arabs in the mainland of Zanzibar.

On 6 August 1890, Lugard began his caravan expedition to Uganda and was accompanied by five other Europeans: George Wilson, Fenwick De Winton (son of Francis de Winton - Lugard's other chief), William Grant and Archibald Brown.

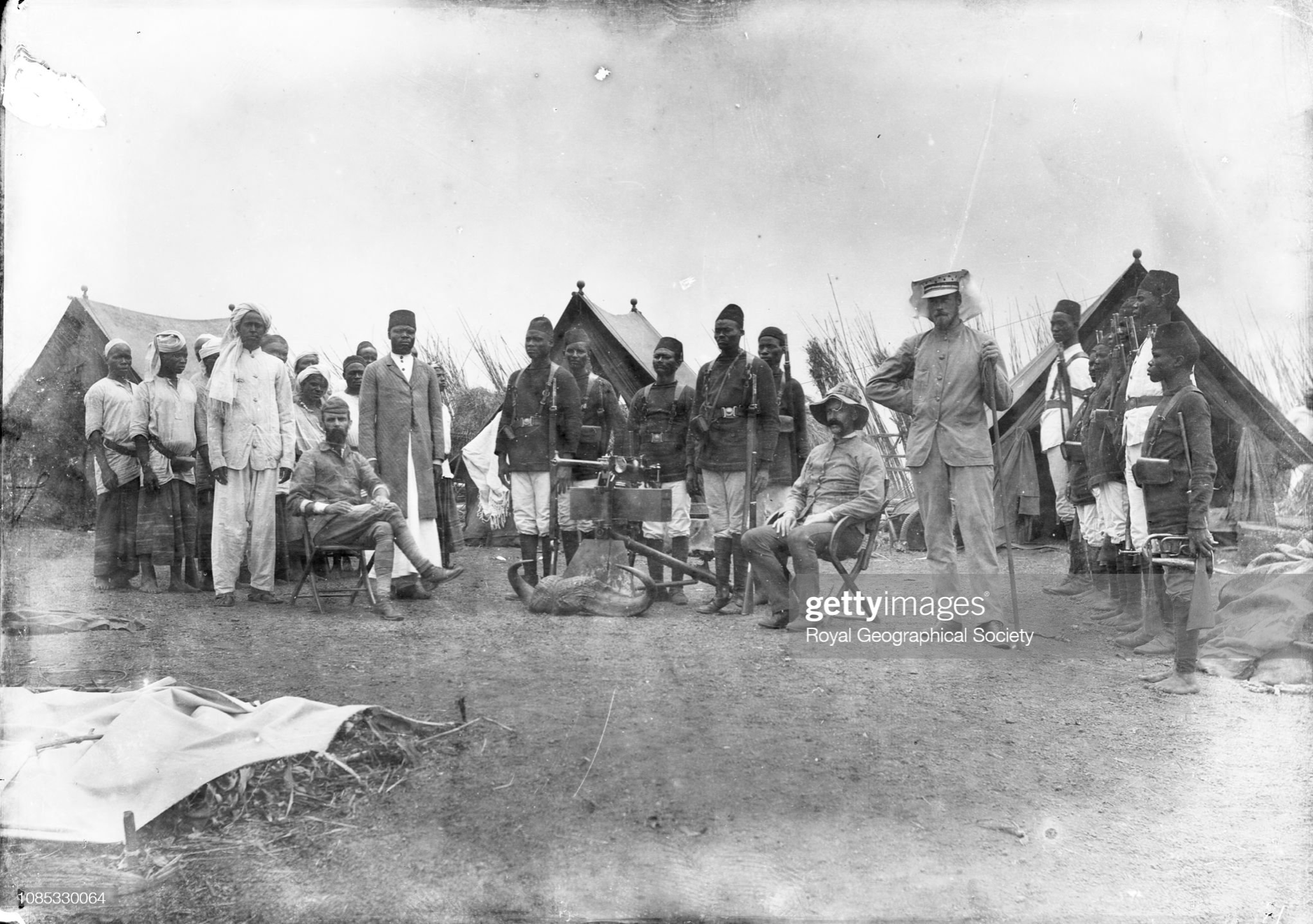
Captain Frederick Lugard, Fenwick de Winton and William Grant at Mengo, Uganda with men of the King's African Rifles and a Maxim gun

He departed from Mombasa towards Uganda to secure British predominance over German influence in the area and to put an end to the civil disturbances between factions in the Kingdom of Buganda.

En route, Lugard was instructed to enter into treaties with local tribes and build forts to secure safe passage for future IBEAC expeditions. The IBEAC employed official treaty documents, which were signed by their administrator and the local leaders, but Lugard preferred the more equitable blood brotherhood ceremony and entered into several brotherhood partnerships with leaders who inhabited the areas between Mombasa and Uganda. One of his famed blood partnerships was sealed in October 1890 during his journey to Uganda, when he stopped at Dagoretti in Kikuyu territory and entered into an alliance with Waiyaki Wa Hinga.

Lugard was Military Administrator of Uganda from 26 December 1890 to May 1892. While administering Uganda, he journeyed around the Rwenzori Mountains to Lake Edward and mapped a large area of the country. He also visited Lake Albert and brought away some thousands of Sudanese who had been left there by Emin Pasha and Henry Morton Stanley during the Emin Pasha Relief Expedition.

When Lugard returned to England in 1892, he successfully dissuaded Prime Minister William Gladstone from allowing the IBEAC to abandon Uganda.

== Early colonial service ==
In 1894, Lugard was dispatched by the Royal Niger Company to Borgu, where he secured treaties with the kings and chiefs who acknowledged the sovereignty of the British company and reduced the influence of other colonial powers. From 1896 to 1897, Lugard took charge of an expedition to Lake Ngami, in modern-day Botswana, on behalf of the British West Charterland Company. He was recalled from Ngami by the British government and sent to West Africa, where he was commissioned to raise a native force to protect British interests in the hinterland of the Lagos Colony and Nigeria against French aggression. He led the 'Race to Nikki' in 1894 and arrived in the important city in Borgu weeks before his French rival. In August 1897, Lugard organised the West African Frontier Force and commanded it until the end of December 1899, when the disputes with France were settled, but Nikki was integrated into the colony of French Dahomey.

After relinquishing command of the West African Frontier Force, Lugard was appointed High Commissioner of the newly created Protectorate of Northern Nigeria. He was present at Mount Patti, Lokoja, and read the proclamation that established the protectorate on 1 January 1900. The portion of Northern Nigeria under effective control was then small, and Lugard's task in organising this vast territory was made more difficult by the refusal of the sultan of Sokoto and many other Fula princes to fulfill their treaty obligations.

In 1903, British control over the whole protectorate was made possible by a successful campaign against the Kano Emirate and the Sokoto Caliphate. When Lugard resigned as commissioner in 1906, the entire region of modern-day Nigeria had become administered under the supervision of British residents.

Lugard was knighted in the 1901 New Year Honours for his service in Nigeria. He stopped slave raiding and abolished slavery and the slave trade. He began developing the country by getting it surveyed and mapped, and he improved transport and communications for colonial convenience. He also reorganised the taxation system. Lugard is most importantly remembered for his political system of rule that was practised in Nigeria, called indirect rule, and for his contributions in the 1914 amalgamation of the Northern and Southern Protectorates of Nigeria .

However, the system of indirect rule has remained criticised from several scholars for its construction of social hierarchies, imbalance of political power and forced adoption of ethnicities, which has increased ethnic conflicts. Although the 1914 amalgamation was intended to create a united nation, it is often considered a "total failure" by scholars, as no attempts were made to integrate several ethnically diverse groups.

== Governor of Hong Kong ==
About a year after he resigned as High Commissioner of the Protectorate of Northern Nigeria, Lugard was appointed Governor of Hong Kong, a position he held until March 1912. During his tenure, Lugard proposed to return Weihaiwei to the Chinese government in return for the ceding of the rented New Territories in perpetuity. However, the proposal was neither well received nor acted upon. Some believed that if the proposal had been carried through, Hong Kong might forever have remained in British hands.

Lugard's chief interest was education, and he was largely remembered for his efforts toward the founding of the University of Hong Kong in 1911. He became the first chancellor despite a cold reception from the Colonial Office and local British companies, such as the Hongkong and Shanghai Banking Corporation. The Colonial Office called the idea of a university "Sir Frederick's pet lamb". Lugard's chief impetus in founding the university was to have it serve as a bearer of Western culture in East Asia. He expected the university, however, to adopt a politically conservative framework supportive of the colonial authorities and to refrain from teaching ideas such as democracy or equality. He was financially backed by his personal friend Sir Hormusjee Naorojee Mody, who shared the same vision for the establishment of a university in Hong Kong.

== Governor of Nigeria ==
In 1912, Lugard returned to Nigeria as Governor of the two protectorates. His mission was to combine the two colonies into one. His mission faced criticism, especially from the press in Lagos. From 1914 to 1919, Lugard served as Governor General of the now combined colony of Nigeria. He sought policies that restricted slavery and alcohol. In Northern Nigeria, the legal status of slavery was abolished, but slaves were not completely emancipated until 1936.

Lugard, espoused a racist and paternalistic view of Nigerians, saying "the typical African ... is a happy, thriftless, excitable person, lacking in self control, discipline and foresight, naturally courageous, courteous and polite, full of personal vanity, with little of veracity; in brief, the virtues and defects of this race-type are those of attractive children".

Funding for infrastructure such as harbours, railways, and hospitals in Southern Nigeria came from revenue generated by taxes on imported alcohol. These taxes were absent in Northern Nigeria, limiting revenue for development. The Adubi War over tax imposition occurred during his governorship.

When the British government decided to raise a local militia to protect the western frontier of the Royal Niger Company's territory against the French advance from Dahomey, Lugard was sent, and he successfully organised the West African Frontier Force, which he used successfully to defend not only the western but also the northern frontiers of Nigeria from French encroachment. This saved Nigeria from the assimilation issues of the French.

Lugard's biggest impact on the making of modern Nigeria was the amalgamation of the North and the South in 1914. Even after the amalgamation, the two parts remained as two separate countries, with separate administrations. "Though in doing this, he aimed primarily at making the wealth and seaport facilities of the South available to the North, he had in fact fashioned the political unity of the Giant of Africa". The amalgamation of Nigeria helped the country have common telegraphs, railways, customs and excise, a Supreme Court, a standard time, a common currency, and a common civil service.

Lugard laid the foundations of continuous legislative assemblies in Nigeria by establishing the Nigerian Council in 1914. It consisted of the Governor, the Chief Secretary, and a few nominated members who met to listen to government policies and give their advice. It was limited as it legislated only for the South. It was a forerunner of the later Legislative Council.

The impact of his work has faced criticism. His policy of isolating the North from the South, a policy that his successors maintained, had a hand in the present disunity of Nigeria. An example is the exclusion of the North from the Legislative Council until 1947. "Thus, it can be said that Lugard sowed the seeds of separatist tendency which has still plagued Nigerian unity". Lugard's attitude to Nigeria implied that he did not envisage self-government for Nigeria. He planned for perpetual British colonialism. "His system of Indirect Rule, his hostility towards educated Nigerians in the South, and his system of education for the North which aimed at training only the sons of the chiefs and emirs as clerks and interpreters show him as one of Britain's arch-imperialists", says K. B. C. Onwubiko.

Regarding the future of British colonialism in Africa, he stated, "For two or three generations we can show the negro what we are, then we shall be asked to go away. Then we shall leave the land to those it belongs to with a feeling that they have better business friends in us than in other white men".

== The Dual Mandate in British Tropical Africa ==
Lugard's The Dual Mandate in British Tropical Africa was published in 1922 and discussed indirect rule in colonial Africa. He argued that administration of Africa could simultaneously promote the well-being of the inhabitants and develop the resources of the continent for the benefit of mankind. According to Lugard, there were three principles of colonial administration: decentralisation (granting power to local district officers in colonies), continuity (extensive record keeping so that successors would build upon the policies of predecessors) and cooperation (building local support for the colonial government). The task of the British, he wrote, was "to promote the commercial and industrial progress of Africa without too careful a scrutiny of the material gains to ourselves".

Some of his justifications for establishing colonial rule included spreading Christianity and ending practices by Africans such as human sacrifice. He also saw state-sponsored colonisation as a way to protect missionaries, local chiefs and local people from each other, as well as from foreign powers. For Lugard, it was also vital that Britain gain control of unclaimed areas before Germany, Portugal or France claimed the land and its resources for themselves. He realised that there were vast profits to be made through the export of resources such as rubber and through taxation of native populations as well as importers and exporters (the British taxpayer continually made a loss from the colonies in this period). In addition, those resources and inexpensive native labour would provide vital fuel for the industrial revolution in resource-depleted Britain, as well as monies for public works projects. Finally, Lugard reasoned that colonisation had become a fad and that to remain a global power, Britain would need to hold colonies to avoid appearing weak.

William Rappard was influenced by Lugard's book. He sought to get Lugard appointed to the Permanent Mandates Commission of the League of Nations.

== League of Nations and abolitionist activism ==
Between 1922 and 1936, Lugard was the British representative on the League of Nations' Permanent Mandates Commission. Lugard saw imperial administration in moral terms and advocated for humane principles of colonial rule. He saw the role of the Permanent Mandates Commission as involving standard-setting and oversight, whereas actual administration should be left to national powers.

Lugard supported General George Spafford Richardson's repressive rule of Western Samoa. Lugard criticised European settlers and Samoans who worked together in "interracial mobilization." Lugard played a key role in drafting a Commission report that exonerated Richardson's governance of Western Samoa and placed the blame of the Western Samoa unrest on the anti-colonial activist Olaf Frederick Nelson.

During this period, he served first on the Temporary Slavery Commission and was involved in organising the 1926 Slavery Convention. He had submitted a proposal for the convention to the British government. Despite being initially alarmed by it, the British government backed the proposal (after subjecting it to considerable redrafting), and it was eventually enacted. He served as one of the seven members of the Committee of Experts on Slavery (CES) of the League of Nations in 1932-1933.

Lugard served on the International Labour Organization's Committee of Experts on Native Labour from 1925 to 1941.

== Beliefs ==
Lugard pushed for indirect rule in the British colonies of Africa. He reasoned that Black Africans were very different from the Europeans although he speculated on the admixture of Aryan or Hamitic blood arising from the advent of Islam among the Hausa and Fulani. He considered that natives should act as a sort of middle manager in colonial governance. That would avoid revolt because, he believed, the native people of Africa would be more likely to follow someone who looked like them, spoke their languages and shared their customs.

Olúfẹmi Táíwò argued that Lugard blocked Black Africans who had been educated in Europe from playing an active role in the development of Colonial Nigeria, and distrusted white "intellectuals" as much as black ones since Lugard believed that the principles they were taught in the universities were often wrong. He preferred to advance prominent Hausa and Fulani leaders from traditional structures.

Lugard was an advocate for European paternalist governance over Black Africans. He described them as holding "the position of a late-born child in the family of nations, and must as yet be schooled in the discipline of the nursery".

== Honours ==
Lugard was appointed a Companion of the Order of the Bath (CB) in 1895. He was knighted as a Knight Commander of the Order of St Michael and St George (KCMG) in the 1901 New Year Honours and raised to a Knight Grand Cross (GCMG) in 1911. He was appointed to the Privy Council in the 1920 New Year Honours. In 1928 he was further honoured when he was elevated to the peerage as Baron Lugard, of Abinger in the County of Surrey.

The Royal Geographical Society awarded him the Founder's Medal in 1902 for persistent attention to African geography.

A bronze bust of Lugard, created by Pilkington Jackson in 1960, is held in the National Portrait Gallery, London.

Lugard Road on Victoria Peak in Hong Kong is named after him.

== Personal life ==
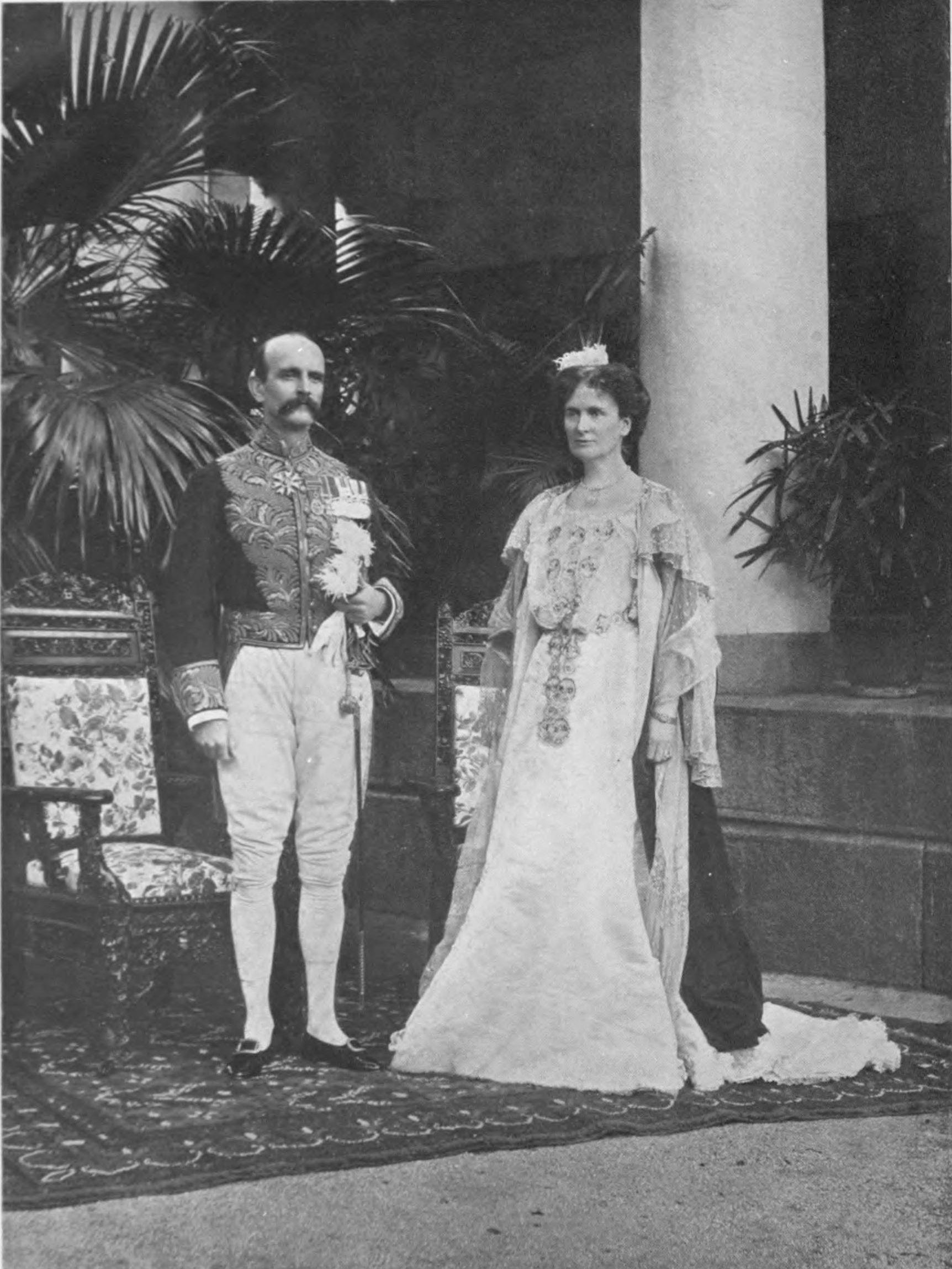
Lord and Lady Lugard

Lugard married on 10 June 1902 Flora Shaw, daughter of Major-General George Shaw, and granddaughter of Sir Frederick Shaw, 3rd Baronet. She was a foreign correspondent for The Times and coined the place name Nigeria. There were no children from the marriage. She died in January 1929.

Lugard survived her by sixteen years and died on 11 April 1945, aged 87. Since he was childless, the barony became extinct. He was cremated at Woking Crematorium.

== Published works ==
- In 1893, Lugard published The Rise of Our East African Empire, which was partially an autobiography. He was also the author of various valuable reports on Northern Nigeria issued by the Colonial Office.
- The Dual Mandate in British Tropical Africa, 1922.

== See also ==
- Indirect rule
- Richmond Palmer
- Frank Lugard Brayne
- George Wilson (Chief Colonial Secretary of Uganda)

== Sources ==
- Lord Lugard, Frederick D. (1965). The Dual Mandate in British Tropical Africa. Fifth Edition. London: Frank Cass & Co. Ltd.
- Middleton, Dorothy (1959). Lugard in Africa. London: Robert Hale, Ltd.
- Miller, Charles (1971). The Lunatic Express, An Entertainment in Imperialism.
- Meyer, Karl E. and Shareen Blair Brysac. Kingmakers: The Invention of the Modern Middle East (2009) pp 59–93.
- Pederson, Susan (2015). The Guardians: the League of Nations and the Crisis of Empire. Oxford: Oxford University Press.
- Perham, Marjery (July 1945). "Lord Lugard: A General Appreciation". Africa: Journal of the International African Institute. 15 (3): 114–122. doi:10.1017/S0001972000034124. JSTOR 1156118. S2CID 147554864.
- Perham, Margery (1956). Lugard. Volume 1: The Years of Adventure 1858–1898. London: Collins.
- Perham, Margery (1960). Lugard. Volume 2: The Years of Authority 1898–1945. London: Collins.
- Perham, Margery, ed. (1959). The Diaries of Lord Lugard (3 Vols.). London: Faber & Faber.
- Taiwo, Alufemi (1999). "Reading the Colonizer's Mind: Lord Lugard and the Philosophical Foundations of British Colonialism". In Babbitt, Susan E; Campbell, Sue (eds.). Racism and Philosophy. Cornell University Press.

Government offices
Preceded by Sir Matthew Nathan	Governor of Hong Kong; 1907–1912	Succeeded by Sir Francis May
New title	Governor-General of Nigeria; 1914–1919	Succeeded by Hugh Clifford as Governor of Nigeria
Peerage of the United Kingdom
New creation	Baron Lugard; 1928–1945	Extinct
