= Victoria Pioneer Rifle Corps =

Former Canadian militia unit

- Active: 1860-1866
- Country: Canada, Formerly the British Colony of British Columbia
- Type: Artillery and Second Unspecified Unit

The Victoria Pioneer Rifle Corps (VPRC), also called the African Rifles, was an all-black militia unit formed in 1860 within the British Colony of British Columbia, now known as British Columbia. The VPRC was formed from volunteering immigrants from California. They were one of British Columbia's first military defense units. The militia unit was dissolved in 1866 due to many black immigrants returning to the United States following the end of the American Civil War and slavery, along with increasing hostility from white militias at the time. The VPRC reflects the desire of Black people to be considered equal, which the VPRC demonstrated by being loyal to the British colony. The Victoria Pioneer Rifle Corps are acknowledged today as an important part of Black history in Canada.

== History ==
In 1858, Governor James Douglas invited Black Americans to immigrate from San Francisco to the British colony of British Columbia. Between 400 and 800 Black American's took the offer and migrated to Victoria, Saanich, and Saltspring Island. The migration was likely due to California's racist laws at the time, which denied Black people from testifying in court, voting, or attending schools and made it easier for Black people to be exploited and victimized. Douglas was interested in increasing settlement to avoid annexation by the United States and was aware of the growing aggression against Black people in America. In 1859, a volunteer fire brigade was being formed, and many Black men volunteered but were excluded by white members in the fire brigade. The Black men then went to Governor James Douglas, under the financial sponsorship of Mifflin Gibbs, to volunteer themselves as a militia unit. Due to the rising tensions with the United States over ownership of the San Juan Island, Douglas allowed the militia unit to form. Douglas, however, never deployed the VPRC, which could have been due to undersupplying the VPRC. Another reason for lack of deployment could have been the tension with the United States was less important than other political issues at the time and was handled through negotiation than force.

The VPRC's first task was building a drill house which became a social community space for the Black Community in British Columbia. The unit was given Royal Marine drill sergeant instructors and drilled twice a week in Church Hill and Beacon Hill Park. The Victoria Pioneer Rifle Corp even celebrated events like Queen Victoria's birthday with a parade.

== Members ==
The militia group was led by 1 captain, 2 lieutenants and 1 sergeant. There were varying accounts of how many total people were in the group, with estimates that first recruitment in 1860 was 60 men, but was around 40 to 50 men in following years.

Some of the known members include:

- Richard H. Johnson - Captain
- Paris Carter - Captain
- Fortune Richards - Captain
- Randel Caesar - Sergeant
- J.B. Johnson- 2nd Lieutenant
- Solomon Stevens - Corporal
- Adolphus C. Richards - Secretary
- Edward A. Booth - Paymaster
- William Brown
- Abner Hunt Frances
- Richard Stokes

== Funding ==
The VPRC first was supplied with antique flintlocks from Hudson's Bay Company. Douglas promised to supply better weaponry from England, but these weapons never made it to the VPRC.. Despite Governor James Douglas support in forming the militia unit, the government gave little to no financial support to the VPRC. Douglas even asked for more updated weaponry, as he promised, and was granted "...29 cases of rifles and 250 barrels of ammunition. A little later, 500 more rifles arrived," none of it made it into the hands of the VPRC

The VPRC got most of their funding from fundraising within the Black community living in British Columbia. They were completely financed by themselves, their fundraising in the Black community, and likely from sponsors like Mifflin Gibbs, a wealthy, Black entrepreneur who migrated up from San Francisco at the time. The troops fundraised by going to the drill house, which became a popular gathering place and social center for the Black community. Often, the women would do the fundraising at the drill house and the Black community would put on other events, most notably the annual celebration of the end of slavery in the British West Indies on August 1, which was a huge event for the Black community and VPRC.

In 1863, the group began to run short on funding and was largely inactive for that year. Despite the lack of funding from the government, the VPRC remained loyal to British Columbia throughout the years.

== Douglas' retirement and Dissolving of VPRC ==
In 1864, James Douglas held a banquet for his retirement as governor of British Columbia. The VPRC was denied to attend the retirement banquet. After Douglas' retirement, Governor Arthur Kennedy succeeded him and refused to allow the VPRC to come to the parade to celebrate Governor Kennedy due to the white fire brigade refusing to march next to them. After Kennedy's arrival, the black volunteers in the VPRC marched to the Legislative Buildings to affirm their loyalty to the governor and voiced the discrimination shown towards them. Kennedy did meet them after his arrival, but provided nothing to support them. Kennedy claimed to want to work on reducing the rift between Black and white people, but did nothing to fulfill this, and even told the VPRC they should disband.

Under Kennedy's power, there were no improvements made on supporting the VPRC and reducing the discrimination between white people and Black people. The constant discrimination, encouragement to disband, and unsupportive environment led to Black people losing interest in the VPRC.

A captain, Richard H. Johnson, addressed these issues in a letter towards the editor for Colonist newspaper, stating that the VPRC's "...enthusiasm and ardour as far as this colony is concerned have evaporated. This mean and scandalous manner in which they were treated upon the advent of Governor Kennedy is still fresh in their minds. Having as much human nature under their dark skins as others of a paler hue, they cannot forget the snubbing they received on that occasion...”

Once the American Civil War ended, many Black people who migrated up to British Columbia returned to the United States after slavery was abolished, leading to the dissolving of the group.

== Legacy ==
The Victoria Pioneer Rifle Corps was one of British Columbia's first military units, making them an important part of British Columbia's history. The VPRC also represents a legacy of Black people in British colony and Canadian history, showing loyalty and the desire to be seen as equals with white people. The VPRC is also a legacy of the Black community in British Columbia, due to their fundraising, events, and the strong bond within the Black community. Some of the members of the VPRC are honored today, like Paris Carter, who was buried in the Ross Bay Cemetery.
