= Karonga War =

1887–1889 armed conflicts in Africa

Date	1887 – 1889
Location	Karonga, Malawi
Result	African Lakes Company victory: Mlozi bin Kazbadema executed in 1895

Belligerents
Swahili; Henga	African Lakes Company; Nyakyusa-Ngonde

Commanders and leaders
Mlozi bin Kazbadema	Frederick Lugard

Casualties and losses
200-300 killed	unknown

The name Karonga War is given to a number of armed clashes that took place between mid-1887 and mid-1889 near Karonga at the northern end of Lake Malawi in what is now Malawi between a Scottish trading concern called the African Lakes Company Limited and elements of the Ngonde people on one side and Swahili traders and their Henga allies on the other. In the 19th century, it was referred to as the “Arab War”, despite few actual Arabs being involved. Although these conflicts predate formal endorsement of a British Central Africa Protectorate west of Lake Malawi in 1891, European involvement, both by the African Lakes Company and by Germans attempting to prevent Swahili slave trading around Lake Tanganyika in German East Africa, had upset the previous balance between the Ngonde and their neighbours and created the conditions for this conflict.

== Situation before the conflict ==
The area to the west of northern Lake Malawi was occupied by two established indigenous peoples, the Tumbuka and Ngonde, and the recently arrived Ngoni. Although the Tumbuka were already involved in the East African ivory trade, in the 1820s and 1830s Swahili traders from the Indian Ocean coast entered the area and displaced the earlier local merchants. These traders, who were backed by Indian financiers in Zanzibar, were as much interested in slaves as ivory. Finally, in the late 1870s, the African Lakes Company began trading in ivory along the shores of Lake Malawi, establishing its trading posts there in the early 1880s.

=== Local peoples ===
The Tumbuka probably entered the area between the Luangwa valley and northern Lake Malawi in the 15th century. At the start of the 18th century, they formed a number of groups, of which that known as the Henga was an important one, and they lived in small, independent communities without a central organisation, that were spread thinly over this area. By the mid-18th century, traders dressed “as Arabs”, although coming from the Unyamwezi region of what is now Tanzania, were involved in trading for ivory and to some extent slaves as far inland as the Luangwa valley. They formed alliances with groups of Henga, and their leader established a dynasty ruling a federation of small chiefdoms around the lakeshore. By the 1830s, this Chikulamayembe (also called Chikuramaybe) dynasty was in decline and the area reverted to a state of political and military disorganisation.

The Ngonde (as they are known in Malawi) occupy the north-western shore of Lake Malawi south of the Songwe River are an offshoot of the Nyakyusa people, who live north of that river in Tanzania. The Ngonde probably moved into Malawi around 1600 and densely settled the area between the Songwe and North Rukuru rivers. Their political organisation involved with relatively strong local chiefs, and a paramount chief or Kyungu from one of two princely lineages. The Kyungu was primarily a religious leader with limited power over the local chiefs. Because the environment of the Karonga plain was favourable for their mixed farming practices, the Ngonde gradually extended the area they occupied, but were not involved in ivory trading networks before the late 19th century.

The Ngoni of Mbelwa (also known as M'mbelwa or Mombera) were a branch of Zwangendaba’s Ngoni, which began its migration from South Africa between 1819 and 1822, eventually reaching southern Tanzania and remained there until Zwangendaba’s death in the mid-1840s. After this, his followers split into several groups, one of which under his son Mbelwa settled permanently in what is now the Mzimba district of northern Malawi around 1855.

Mbelwa’s Ngoni treated the Henga as a subject population, exacting tribute and taking captives through raiding. These captives were rarely sold to the Swahili traders, but retained as unfree agricultural workers or enrolled in Ngoni regiments. Some Henga soldiers fled back to their original homeland around 1879 but were attacked by the Ngoni in 1881 and forced to move north into Ngonde territory, where the Ngonde settled them as a buffer against their enemies. Zwangendaba’s Ngoni had raided the Ngonde in the 1840s and Mbelwa’s Ngoni did so in the 1850s and 1870s. Each time, the Ngonde had been forced to surrender many cattle, so they feared further raids.

=== Advent of the Swahili and Europeans ===
Around 1880, a group of Swahili traders who were established in the elephant-rich Luangwa valley sent one of their number, Mlozi bin Kazbadema from Ujiji, now in Tanzania, to act as their agent in the area to the north-west of Lake Malawi. He headed a party which established a camp near Mbande Hill, the seat of the Ngonde paramount chief, about 25 kilometres (15 mi) inland from the lake, and a stockade at Chilumba on Lake Malawi, from where ivory and slaves could be shipped across the lake. This was followed by other stockades, from which Mlozi also carried out an active trade in ivory with the African Lakes Company’s depot at Karonga.

Contemporary Europeans in East Africa described these traders as Arabs, one writer dividing them into three classes: a few “White Arabs” from Oman, other Arab states of the Persian Gulf, Iran or Balochistan and the majority, either Muslim “Mswahili” from the east coast of Africa or Nyamwezi people from Unyamwezi, who imitated Arab dress and customs but were only rarely Muslim. Other Nyamwezi who had not adopted Arab ways and who acted as the traders’ armed guards were known as Ruga-Ruga.

The African Lakes Company, which cooperated closely with the Scottish missions, began its transport and trading concern that aimed to replace the slave trade by legitimate commerce and develop European influence in 1878. Its local managers, the brothers John Moir and Frederick Moir concentrated on trading ivory rather than cash crops, facing stiff completion from established Swahili merchants. In 1883, the company set up a base in Karonga to exchange ivory for trade goods.

== Growth of tensions ==
=== Trading rivalries ===
The popularity of the so-called Arab traders arose from the ready supply of a wide range of trade goods they brought, not only guns and ammunition, but also iron tools and utensils, and cloth. This varied supply, for which African chiefs were prepared to exchange slaves as well as ivory, could not be matched by the African Lakes Company's intermittent supplies of European goods. The Swahili initially had good relations with the Ngonde, but as many of their stockades were built in the area where the Henga had been settled, the Ngonde began to distrust both the Henga and the Swahili.

Initially, relations between Mlozi and Low Monteith Fotheringham, the African Lakes Company's local representative, were cordial, but their relationship later deteriorated, partly because of the company's delays in supplying goods in exchange for ivory, its unwillingness to provide guns or ammunition and its limited supply of other trade goods, and also because the Swahili traders turned more to slaving and began to attack the Ngonde communities that the company had promised to protect.

The African Lakes Company's failure lay in part with its lack of sufficient finances to realise its ambitious plans, but also because it thought that trading in ivory and in slaves were intimately connected, as David Livingstone among others had observed recently enslaved Africans being forced to carry ivory to the coast. However, by the 1870s, most ivory porters were paid specialists, not slaves, and the relation between in ivory and slaves was an inverse one: the increasing European demand for ivory led to a depletion of the elephant herds in many areas, whose people were then forced to sell slaves in exchange for the trade goods they wanted, which they had formerly bartered ivory to acquire.

After spending several years trying unsuccessfully to undermine the Swahili trading networks, by 1884 the African Lakes Company was almost bankrupt. It blamed the Swahili for this, and tried to revive its fortunes by making treaties with Ngonde chiefs on the Karonga lakeshore, with a view to preventing them trading with the Swahili traders. These treaties were not only commercial but promised protection, which the Ngonde interpreted as protection against the Swahili and Henga and not only from the Ngoni, which is what the company had intended.

Although the African Lakes Company was formed with the benevolent aims of cooperating with the Scottish missions and combating the slave trade, its local agents claimed to have made a series of treaties with local chiefs around its trading station at Karonga. There was little documentation for these, some of which may have been spurious, but several treaties offered protection and claimed to transfer sovereignty over the territory involved to the company, which may have had the ambition to become a Chartered company. This ambition was strongly opposed by missionaries based in Blantyre, south of Lake Malawi and Hawes, the Consul to the Lake Region, but initially supported by missionaries based further north in Livingstonia.

=== Indigenous volatility ===
The Ngonde were concerned both about Mbelwa's Ngoni, even though the latter were settled some distance to the south, and about the Nyakyusa people to the north. Although the Nyakyusa were closely related to the Ngonde, they nevertheless raided their more affluent relatives. To protect their northern border, the Ngonde resettled those Henga warriors who had been drafted into Ngoni regiments but had later revolted, and also hoped to use the Swahili traders and their well-armed guards to protect their southern flank. However, the Swahili preferred to remain on good terms with the Ngoni. The Henga, who were trained soldiers, could not adapt to life as farmers and remained unassimilated into Ngonde society, although they initially prevented Nyakyusa raids.

After the death of an unusually strong Ngonde Kyungu in 1878 or 1879, his successor was weak and unable to provide firm leadership. In 1885 several powerful men among the Ngonde signed treaties with the African Lakes Company which claimed to cede large areas of land to it without consulting the paramount chief, and one Ngonde faction planned to massacre the Henga without the Kyungu's knowledge. This faction wished to use the African Lakes Company to oppose and possibly replace their paramount chief, who consequently attempted to use the Swahili to strengthen his position.

In addition to the internal conflict within the Ngonde state, the Henga leader died in 1887 and his following split into two groups, one led by his son, which represented the warriors, the other included those that had adapted to agricultural life.

== War ==
Although conflict between the Swahili traders their guards and their Henga allies continued with greater or less intensity from mid 1887 to 1895, the accounts of Fotheringham and Lugard, which only record fighting which involved Europeans, identify four distinct periods: in October to December 1887, March 1888, May to August 1888 and February to March 1889. Minor incidents occurred at other times, and the war was formally ended by a treaty on 22 October 1889. Both Fotheringham and Lugard's accounts are written from the British perspective and give no clear indications of the size of the forces employed by the Swahili and their allies or the Ngonde.

=== Outbreak ===
After the African Lakes Company set up its Karonga trading base, it brokered a settlement between the Ngonde and Nyakyusa, and as the threat of Ngoni raids also declined, the usefulness of Henga and Swahili as buffers was reduced. Both groups were aliens in the Ngonde state and were suspicious of cooperation between the company and the Ngonde, so they allied with each other. Fotheringham's own account admits that one of the main sources of the company's problems in 1887 was that it had bought a large quantity of ivory from the “Arabs” on credit, more than could be paid for by a single boat-load of trade goods, and the creditors and their armed followers were forced to wait for several months for satisfaction, expecting the local Ngonde to supply food in the interim. Quarrels between the Swahili traders and the Ngonde people from whom they demanded supplies began in late 1886 and culminated in a violent assault on a trader in July 1887.

This assault was used by Mlozi as the pretext to strike at the Ngonde before they decided that the Swahili were superfluous to their needs. After the killing of a local chief in reprisal, the Swahili, their Ruga-Ruga guards and their Henga allies drove out the Ngonde villagers from the Karonga Plain to a distance of 19 kilometres (12 mi) from the lake over the next few months and, in October 1887, killed a paramount chief or king of the Ngonde.

Although Mlozi was careful not to antagonise the Europeans directly, after this attack he proclaimed himself Sultan of Nkonde and demanded tribute from the African Lakes Company in October 1887, although did not attack when this was refused. The Ngonde sought protection from the African Lakes Company, which was initially refused. However, after further fighting in which the Ngonde were defeated and their paramount chief's village was sacked, many fled to Karonga, where they were given shelter in the African Lakes Company's compound. Fotheringham claimed that the Swahili wished to drive the Ngonde from their homeland and replace them with the Henga mercenaries they had recruited, and that they also intended to attack Karonga, so he issued arms to company employees and strengthened Karonga's defences. Fotheringham also feared that the advance of the Swahili would jeopardize the company's independent position and reduce it to dependence on Mlozi. Although it was portrayed as a fight against slavery, it was as much a trade war.

=== The first periods of fighting ===
The small African Lakes Company presence at Karonga consisted of Fotheringham, his assistant and about 60 African company workers: they had had few firearms and little ammunition. Fotheringham appealed to the African Lakes Company headquarters in Blantyre for assistance, and the British Consul at Mozambique, O'Neill, who normal area of consular authority did not include the Karonga area but acting on behalf of Hawes, the absent Consul to the Lake Region, organised a relief expedition. On 4 November, O'Neill reached Karonga by lake-steamer with three other Europeans. After some weeks of stand-off, Mlozi's men made several armed attacks between 23 and 28 November but were beaten off and retired. However, O'Neill and Fotheringham abandoned Karonga as too difficult to defend, and sought shelter with a group of Nyakyusa north of the Songwe River, where they were later reinforced by a small group which Hawes, Consul to the Lake Region, back from leave, had brought by a steamer which also carried arms and ammunition. On 23 December 1887, the company force with its Nyakyusa and Ngonde allies attacked Mlozi's headquarters, resulting in an indecisive skirmish, after which the majority of Europeans returned to the south.

There followed a dispute between the two consuls, Hawes wishing to discontinue the armed conflict while O'Neill wanted to attack Mlozi again. As a result, O'Neill returned to Mozambique, but Hawes also quarrelled with John Moir, the African Lakes Company's representative in Blantyre who was supported by most of the European settlers that settlement. O'Neill departed on leave after appointing John Buchanan as Acting Consul. Hawes was later reassigned to Zanzibar and Buchanan remained in post until Henry Hamilton Johnston arrived in March 1889 Frederick Moir, John's brother took a small party of armed men north, arriving at the abandoned site of Karonga on 3 March 1888; Buchanan arrived a few days later, and met Mlozi and other Swahili leaders with the aim of negotiating a settlement on 20 March. The Swahili apparently agreed to evacuate the Ngonde country and destroy their stockades, but later declined to sign an agreement to that effect, so Buchanan left. Meanwhile, Frederick Moir and Fotheringham, manager of the Karonga depot, had recruited some 500 African fighters, 270 with firearms, and rebuilt the Karonga stockade, after which they launched an abortive attack on a Swahili-controlled village in which Moir was severely wounded

=== Lugard’s arrival ===
In May 1888, Captain Lugard of the Indian Army, later Frederick Lugard, 1st Baron Lugard arrived in Blantyre, having earlier met O’Neill in Mozambique. O’Neill had told him that the forces at Karonga needed a competent commander. When he reached Blantyre he told Buchanan that, in his opinion, immediate military action against Mlozi and his followers was necessary to protect the missions and the Ngonde people, and to prevent other Swahili traders who had not previously supported Mlozi from joining forces with him, However, Buchanan declined to give him official support in view of Hawes’ opposition and the wish of the British government to avoid involvement. Although Buchanan, and later the Foreign Office and War Office, gave Lugard no official support, they did not oppose his actions on the basis that they were ostensibly to protect the missions rather than the African Lakes Company.

Lugard left Blantyre in mid-May 1888 and, with around 20 Europeans including John Moir and six other company employees, travelled up Lake Malawi by steamer, pausing at Bandawe to recruit 200 Tonga as soldiers, who were to march to Karonga His first aim was to attack Mlozi's stockade at Chilumba, where slaves and ivory were ferried across the lake. This was captured in a surprise attack and destroyed, after which the steamer continued to Karonga, arriving on 28 May, to reinforce the African Lakes Company employees and numerous Ngonde refugees in the company stockade, which Lugard strengthened and extended.

After the arrival of the Tonga troops, Lugard prepared to attack the Swahili stockades. His attack, on 16 June, failed after he was wounded, and most of the expedition withdrew in August, leaving a small party in Karonga. Although several of the missions with interests in the area around Lake Malawi petitioned the British government to declare a protectorate and send troops, Lord Salisbury declined to do so, but agreed that the African Lakes Company and the missions were entitled to defend themselves.

=== Lugard’s second expedition ===
Lugard returned to Karonga in October and, on 28 November, he there met an envoy of Sultan of Zanzibar, Khalifa bin Said, who claimed suzerainty over Swahili communities in East and Central Africa. The envoy failed to convince Mlozi and his associates to reach a settlement and, in December, hostilities resumed with a Swahili attack on the Chilumba stockade, which Lugard had repaired and garrisoned the previous month. This attack failed and Lugard decided to ensure that Mlozi evacuated his strongholds or to force him out of them. On 16 January 1889, he took delivery of a 7-pounder gun and gave Mlozi an ultimatum to depart by 31 January. After the ultimatum expired, Lugard, with a force of nine Europeans armed with rifles, around 250 Africans, most armed with antiquated muskets, and the gun, attacked one Swahili stockade on 14 February and another on 13 March. Although the field gun caused casualties, its shells did not destroy either stockade. Shortly after the second failure, Lugard left Karonga for Blantyre, which he left on 9 April, arriving at Zanzibar on 3 May 1889 en route to Britain. Six European African Lakes Company employees and an unknown number of armed Africans remained in Karonga, and there was stalemate as neither the company nor the Swahili traders could expel the other. The company's failure to expel Mlozi and the other hostile traders put an end to its political claims to become a chartered company with a protectorate over this area.

== Treaty and aftermath ==
Lugard never returned to Nyasaland but his activities put pressure on the British government to intervene and, in November 1888, it appointed Harry Johnston as Consul in Mozambique, with an area of consular authority covering Central Africa as well as the Portuguese controlled coast. Johnston arrived at Blantyre in March 1889: at that time he had no significant military forces, and agreed a truce with Mlozi in October 1889 to avoid confrontation with him and other slave traders in the north. However, despite the provisions in the truce agreement for the Swahili to allow the Ngonde to return to their villages unmolested and to reduce the number of their stockades, Buchanan, who visited Karonga in March 1891 and met Mlozi, reported to Johnston that, rather than expelled Ngonde being allowed to return, others were still being forced out of their homes, and the Swahili traders were building more fortified villages and restricting the African Lakes Company's trading activities.

Although on the formation of the British Central Africa Protectorate in 1891, Johnston was provided with a small force of Indian troops and trained more African soldiers over the next few years, he was fully engaged in the south of the protectorate until 1894. Between 1891 and 1894, Mlozi and his Henga allies had made further attacks on the Ngonde people and, the African Lakes Company claimed, threatened to attack Karonga again. Mlozi refused either to meet Johnston, who visited Karonga in June 1895, or curtail his raiding activities, so Johnston decided on military action.

Johnston first secured the neutrality of the Swahili ruler of Nkhotakota by paying him a subsidy and prepared to attack the Mlozi and the so-called “north end Arabs”. In November 1895, he embarked a force of over 400 Sikh and African riflemen, with artillery and machine guns on steamers at Mangochi, bound for Karonga. Without any prior warning, he assaulted two smaller stockades on 2 December and, on the same day, surrounded Mlozi's large, double-fenced stockaded town, bombarding it for two days and finally assaulting it on 4 December, facing stiff resistance. Mlozi was captured, given a cursory trial and hanged on 5 December. Between 200 and 300 of Mlozi's fighters were killed, many while attempting to surrender, and several hundred non-combatants were also killed in the bombardment. The other Swahili stockades did not resist and were destroyed

The Karonga War was minor in terms of combatants and casualties compared to the First or Second Matabele War in Southern Rhodesia but it had major significance for the history of Malawi, particularly the north of the country, because it forced a change in British government policy. This had originally been to ensure that no other power controlled the area west and south of Lake Malawi, but without Britain assuming any sovereignty over that area. It changed to one where Britain felt it necessary to proclaim a protectorate. Like the roughly contemporaneous Abushiri revolt in German East Africa, the war represented the end of the political influence of Swahili traders acknowledging the Sultan of Zanzibar's authority in East and Central Africa, and the end of attempts of Chartered companies to assume or retain control in place of their home governments.
