= Dumbutu =

Coordinates: 13°20′57″N 15°50′02″W

Dumbutu (also called Dumbuttu or Dumbuto) is a village in the Gambia and it is located in the Lower River Division.
