= Sankandi =

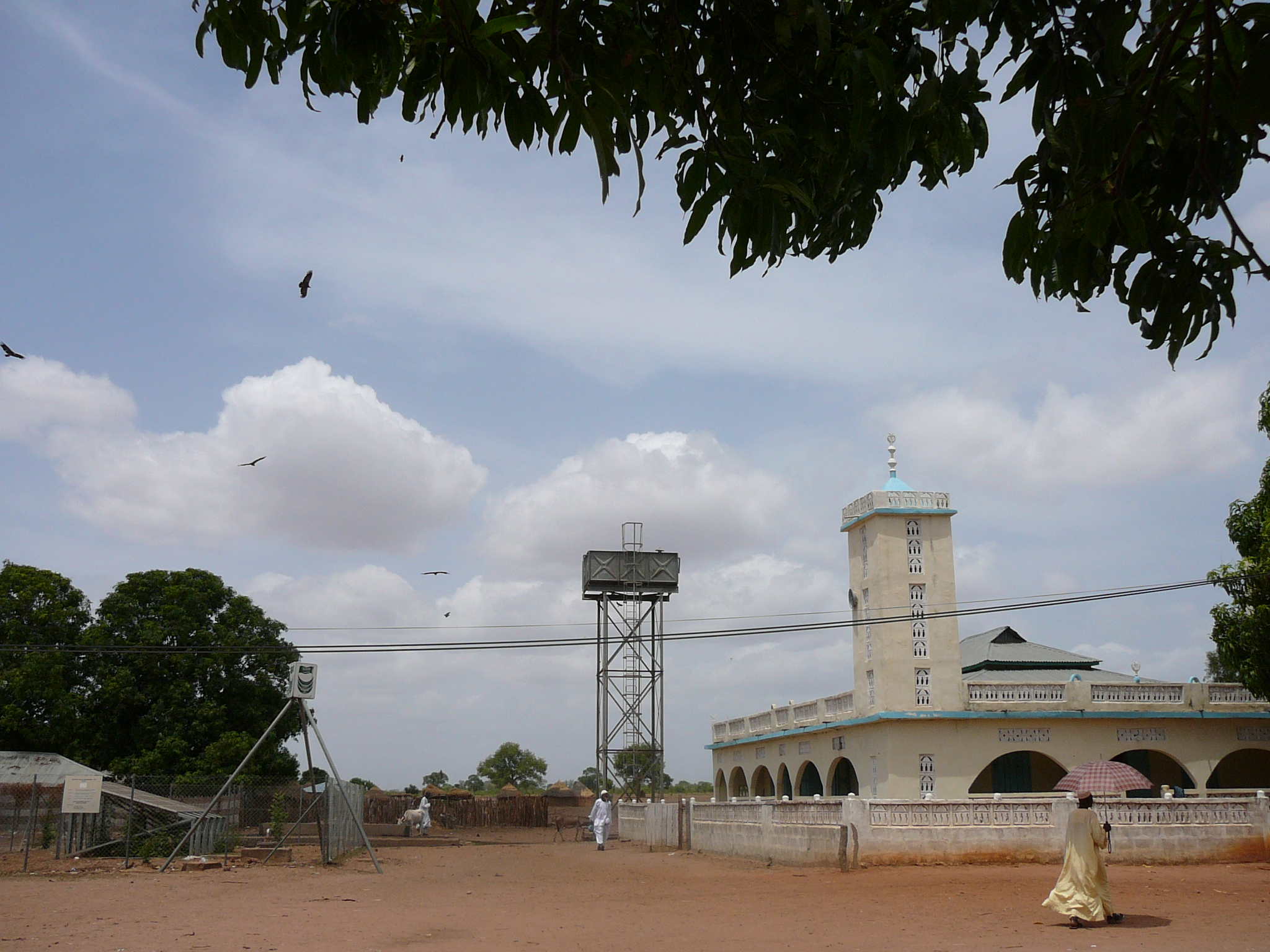

- Location in the Gambia
- Coordinates: 13°18′15″N 15°50′0″W
- Country: The Gambia
- Division: Lower River Division
- District: Kiang West

Population
  - Total: 585

Sankandi is a town in the Lower River Division of the Gambia. It is in Kiang West district. In 2007, 585 people lived in Sankandi. In its history two Britons, who tried to make peace, were murdered in 1900. The Britons fought back and crushed the village.

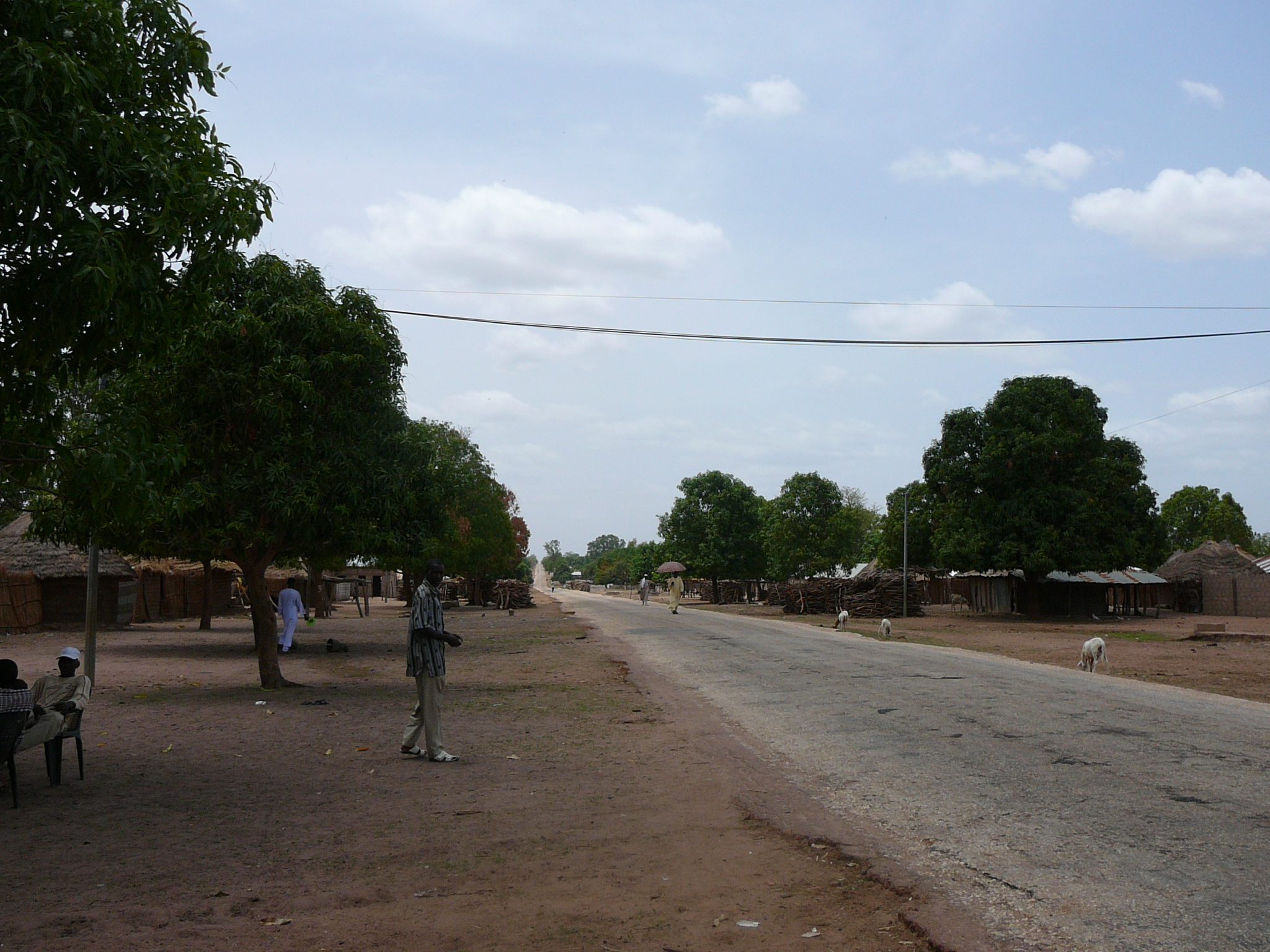

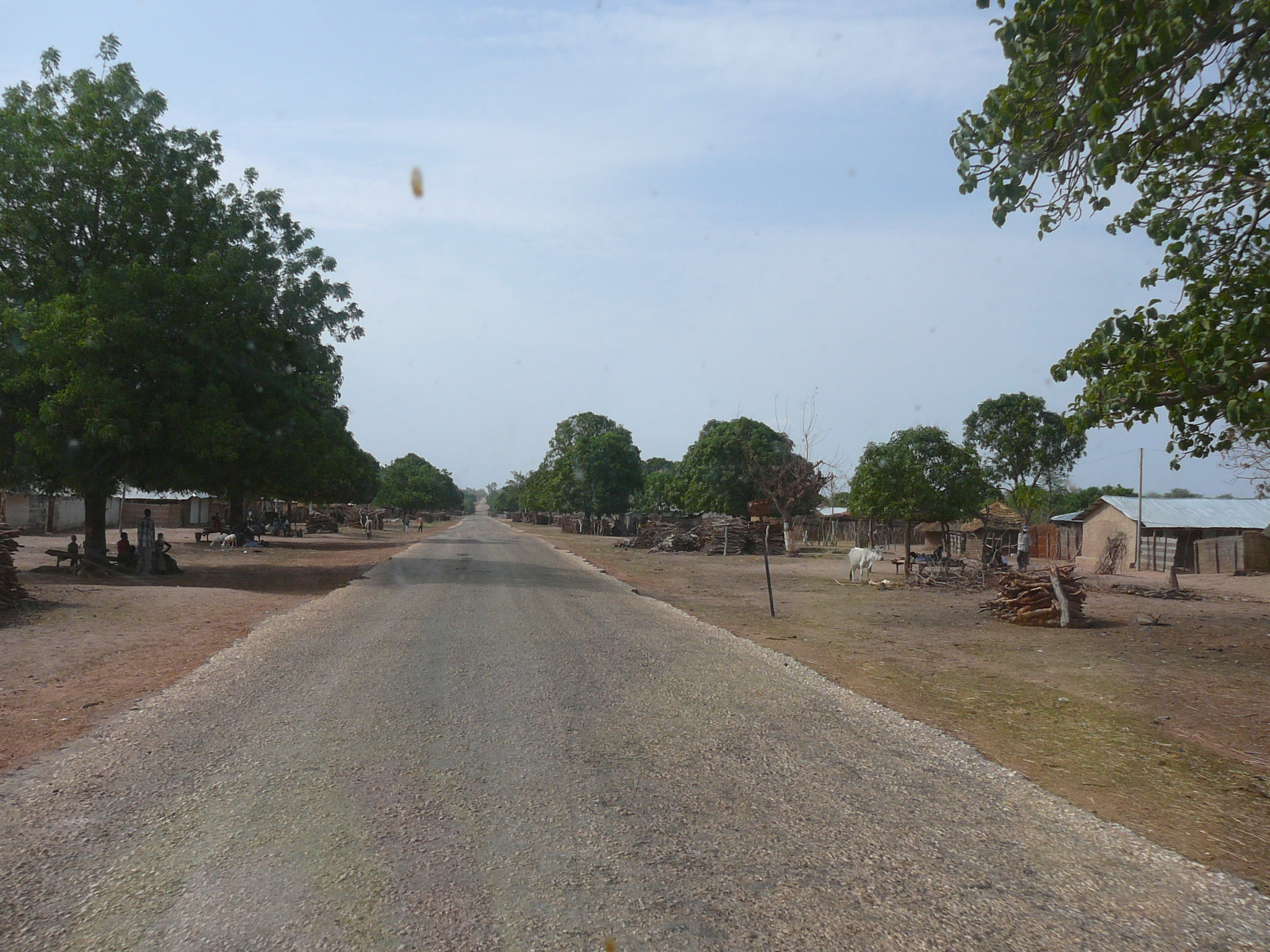
