= Mlozi bin Kazbadema =

Mlozi bin Kazbadema or only Mlozi (died 1895) was an African slave trader.

He established a significant slave trade empire in Malawi, which he declared to be a Sultanate, and which became a transit area for the export of slaves from the African interior to the Swahili coast of East Africa and to the Arab world via the Indian Ocean slave trade. He was a central figure of the Karonga War against the British, and was for a long time associated with the East African slave trade.

== Biography ==
Mlozi was a Swahili Arab slave trader from the Swahili coast.

In 1879, he and his colleagues established a trade base in the tribal area of Ngonde in the Luangwa Valley by Karonga. It became a major transit area for the transport of slaves from Central Africa to the Lake Malawi, and then to Swahili coast, where they supplied the Indian Ocean slave trade with slaves. Mlozi declared himself the ruling Sultan of the territory he controlled.

Mlozi initially collaborated with the Ngonde people, but eventually they became involved in a conflict. Ngonde made an alliance treaty with the British, who attempted to gain influence in the area in the 1880s. This resulted in warfare between Mlozi and Ngonde and thereby also between Mlozi and the British.

Mlozi was executed by the British in 1895.
