= East Africa Rifles =

The East Africa Rifles was a British Colonial Auxiliary Forces military unit created in 1895 that was later merged into the King's African Rifles in 1902. Based in the East Africa Protectorate but containing troops from across the British Empire, it fought against the Mazrui and the Ogaden people in Jubaland.
