= 1917 New Year Honours =

Appointments by King George V

The 1917 New Year Honours were appointments by King George V to various orders and honours to reward and highlight good works by citizens of the British Empire. The appointments were published in several editions of The London Gazette in January and February.

The 1 January list contained only military honours earned during the ongoing war, particularly for the Battle of the Somme, while political honours were delayed. The announcement was celebrated by The Times in its New Year's Day reporting:

"It is a welcome change to publish a list of New Year's Honours which have been earned altogether in the honourable service of the State. What are sometimes called 'political honours' – the results too often of personal and party manoeuvres – seem indescribably repellent in these days of national strain. We cannot, unfortunately, congratulate ourselves that their omission to-day is anything more than a postponement; but for the moment at all events we have a list confined entirely to sailors and soldiers and to civilians whose claim to distinction rests wholly on public service. We rejoice especially in the well-timed promptness with which the official report of the greatest battle in English history is followed by a large recognition of the men responsible for its success."

The recipients of honours are displayed here as they were styled before their new honour, and arranged by honour, with classes (Knight, Knight Grand Cross, etc.) and then divisions (Military, Civil, etc.) as appropriate.

== United Kingdom and British Empire ==
=== Viscount ===
- The Right Honourable Weetman Pearson, Baron Cowdray, by the name, style and title of Viscount Cowdray, of Cowdray, in the county of Sussex. President of the Air Board.
- The Right Honourable William Mansfield, Baron Sandhurst, GCSI GCIE GCVO, by the name, style and title of Viscount Sandhurst, of Sandhurst, in the county of Berkshire. Lord Chamberlain of the Household.

=== Baron and Viscount ===
- The Right Honourable Lewis Harcourt, by the names, styles and titles of Baron Nuneham, of Nuneham Courtenay, in the county of Oxford, and Viscount Harcourt, of Stanton Harcourt, in the said county of Oxford

=== Baron ===
- Sir William Maxwell Aitken, Bt, by the name, style and title of Baron Beaverbrook, of Beaverbrook, in the Province of New Brunswick, in the Dominion of Canada, and of Cherkley, in the county of Surrey
- Sir John Alexander Dewar, Bt, by the name, style and title of Baron Forteviot, of Dupplin, in the county of Perth
- The Right Honourable Charles Beilby Stuart-Wortley, by the name, style and title of Baron Stuart of Wortley, of the city of Sheffield
- Sir Edward Partington, Kt, by the name, style and title of Baron Doverdale, of Westwood Park, in the county of Worcester
- The Right Honourable Joseph Albert Pease, by the name, style and title of Baron Gainford, of Headlam, in the county of Durham
- Sir Thomas Roe, Kt, by the name, style and title of Baron Roe, of the borough of Derby

=== The Most Honourable Order of the Bath ===
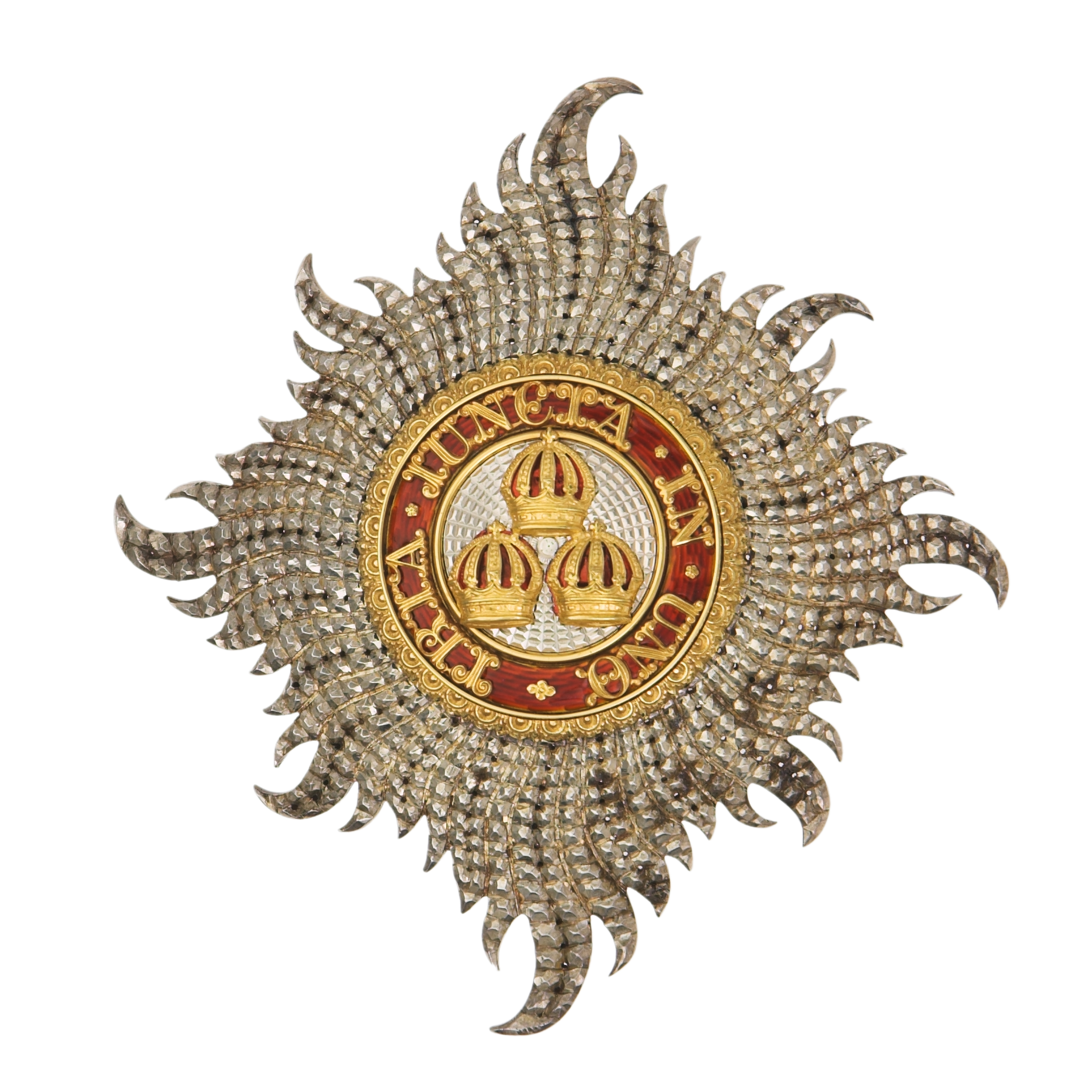
Civilian star of the Knight Grand Cross of the Order of the Bath

==== Knight Grand Cross of the Order of the Bath (GCB) ====
===== Military Division =====
Army

- General Sir William Robert Robertson, KCB KCVO DSO, Colonel, 2nd Dragoons
- Surgeon-General Sir Alfred Keogh, KCB FRCP

===== Civil Division =====
- The Right Honourable Sir Samuel Thomas Evans, President of the Probate, Divorce and Admiralty Division of the High Court of Justice

==== Knight Commander of the Order of the Bath (KCB) ====
===== Military Division =====
Royal Navy

- Vice-Admiral William Lowther Grant, CB

Army

- Major-General Sir Frederick Thomas Clayton, KCMG CB
- Major-General Frederick Ivor Maxse, CVO CB DSO
- Major-General Henry de Beauvoir De Lisle, CB DSO
- Surgeon-General Hayward Reader Whitehead, CB FRCS
- Major-General Charles Toler MacMorrough Kavanagh, CVO CB DSO
- Major-General Walter Norris Congreve, VC CB MVO
- Major-General Charles James Briggs, CB
- Major-General Edward Arthur Fanshawe, CB
- Major-General Claud William Jacob, CB
- Major-General The Honourable Herbert Alexander Lawrence, CB
- Surgeon-General William Donovan, CB
- Major-General Frederick Charles Shaw, CB
- Major-General Herbert Guthrie Smith, CB
- Major-General Robert Dundas Whigham, CB DSO
- Colonel (temporary Surgeon-General) Neville Reginald Howse, VC CB, Australian Army Medical Corps
- Major-General Charles Herbert Powell, CB, Indian Army

===== Civil Division =====
- Maurice Bonham Carter, Private Secretary to the late Prime Minister and First Lord of the Treasury
- Major John Norton-Griffiths, DSO MP, 2nd Regiment, King Edward's Horse
- Colonel the Right Honourable William Heneage, Earl of Dartmouth, Honorary Colonel, North Midland Divisional Train, Army Service Corps (Territorial Force), President and Chairman Staffordshire Territorial Force Association
- Sir Frederick William Black, CB, Director General of Munitions Supply, Director of Contracts, Admiralty
- Arthur Newsholme, CB FRCP, Chief Medical Officer, Local Government Board
- Oswyn Alexander Ruthven Murray, CB, Assistant Secretary, Admiralty
- Sir Herbert Ashcombe Walker, Acting Chairman of the Railway Executive Committee
- Colonel The Honourable James Allen, Minister of Defence, New Zealand
- Stephenson Kent, Director of the Department of Labour Supply, Ministry of Munitions
- Arthur McDougal Duckham, Chairman of the Advisory Committee, Ministry of Munitions
- Charles Ellis, Director General, Ordnance Supply, Ministry of Munitions
- Eustace Henry Tennyson d'Eyncourt, CB, Director of Naval Construction, Admiralty
- Major General Sir Charles Crutchley, KCVO, Governor of Chelsea Hospital

==== Companion of the Order of the Bath (CB) ====
===== Military Division =====
Royal Navy

- Captain Anselan John Buchanan Stirling, in recognition of his services with a Destroyer Flotilla during the Battle of Jutland (dated 31 May 1916)
- Vice-Admiral Richard Bowles Farquhar.
- Rear-Admiral Godfrey Harry Brydges Mundy, CVO.
- Rear-Admiral Henry Hervey Campbell, CVO
- Rear-Admiral Edmund Radcliffe Pears.
- Rear-Admiral Charles Lionel Vaughan-Lee.
- Captain Brian Herbert Fairbairn Barttelot, MVO
- Engineer Rear-Admiral William John Anstey.
- Inspector-General John Cassilis Birkmyre Maclean, MB, Royal Navy (retired).
- Paymaster-in-chief William Le Geyt Pullen.

Army

- Major-General Reginald John Pinney
- Major-General Victor Arthur Couper
- Major-General Oliver Stewart Wood Nugent, DSO
- Major-General Richard Harte Keatinge Butler
- Colonel Cecil Hill, Royal Engineers
- Colonel Lionel Norton Herbert, Indian Army
- Colonel Arthur Long, CMG DSO, Royal Army Service Corps
- Colonel James Murray Irwin, MB, late Royal Army Medical Corps
- Colonel Steuart Wellwood Hare
- Colonel Henry Brooke Hagstromer Wright, CMG
- Colonel Godfrey Leicester Hibbert, DSO
- Colonel Douglas Campbell
- Colonel Richard Lucas Mullens
- Colonel Edward Northey, ADC
- Lieutenant-Colonel and Brevet Colonel George McKenzie Franks, Royal Artillery
- Colonel Charles Guinand Blackader, DSO ADC
- Lieutenant-Colonel and Brevet Colonel Edward Peter Strickland, CMG DSO, Manchester Regiment
- Colonel Robert Lockhart Ross Macleod, MB, Army Medical Service
- Colonel Gerald Cree, CMG, Army Medical Service
- Colonel Alexander Arthur Button, DSO, Army Medical Service
- Colonel George Henry Barefoot, CMG, Royal Army Medical Corps
- Lieutenant-Colonel and Brevet Colonel Wilfrid Edward Bownas Smith, CMG, Lincolnshire Regiment
- Colonel Alain Chartier Joly de Lotbinière, CSI CIE
- Temp Colonel Thomas Sinclair, MD FRCS, Army Medical Service
- Lieutenant-Colonel and Brevet Colonel Philip Rynd Robertson CMG, Scottish Rifles
- Lieutenant-Colonel and Brevet Colonel William Thwaites, Royal Artillery
- Lieutenant-Colonel and Brevet Colonel Thomas Angus Tancred, CMG, Royal Artillery
- Lieutenant-Colonel and Brevet Colonel Webb Gillman, CMG DSO, Royal Artillery
- Lieutenant-Colonel and Brevet Colonel Archibald Rice Cameron, CMG, Royal Highlanders
- Major and Brevet Colonel Travers Edward Clarke, Royal Inniskilling Fusiliers
- Major and Brevet Colonel Charles Harington Harington, DSO, Liverpool Regiment
- Major and Brevet Colonel John Humphrey Davidson, DSO, King's Royal Rifle Corps
- Lieutenant-Colonel and Brevet Colonel John Theodosius Burnett-Stuart, CMG DSO, Rifle Brigade
- Lieutenant-Colonel and Brevet Colonel George Edward Pereira, CMG DSO
- Lieutenant-Colonel Frederick Gustav Lewis, CMG, London Regiment
- Lieutenant-Colonel Reginald Ford, CMG DSO, Army Service Corps
- Lieutenant-Colonel William John Napier, CMG, Royal Artillery
- Lieutenant-Colonel Edwin Thomas Fairweather Birrell, CMG MB, Royal Army Medical Corps, Australian Imperial Force
- Colonel James Gordon Legge, CMG, Council of Defence, Commonwealth of Australia
- Major-General John Burton Forster
- Surgeon-General William Wallace Kenny, MB FRCSI
- Honorary Colonel Alfred Ernest Queripel, late Advanced Vehicle Depot
- Colonel Peter Henry Hammond
- Lieutenant-Colonel and Brevet-Colonel Stephen Dickson Rainsford, late Royal Artillery
- Colonel John Edward Blackburn
- Colonel Arthur Gillespie Churchill
- Colonel and Honorary Brigadier-General Robert Theophilus Hewitt Law, late Royal Army Ordnance Depot
- Colonel and Honorary Brigadier-General Noel Montagu Lake
- Colonel James Henry Cowan
- Colonel Samuel Arthur Einem Hickson, DSO
- Lieutenant-Colonel and Brevet-Colonel Bertram Percy Portal, DSO, late 17th Lancers
- Colonel Henry Stopford Dawkins
- Colonel Francis James Anderson
- Colonel Edward North, FRCS, Army Medical Service
- Colonel Frederick Falkiner Minchin
- Colonel Frank Herbert Horniblow
- Lieutenant-Colonel and Brevet Colonel Herbert Alexander Chapman, late Royal Artillery
- Colonel Henry Lawrence Gardiner
- Colonel William Cyril Minchin, Army Pay Department
- Lieutenant-Colonel and Brevet Colonel Alfred Granville Balfour
- Colonel Stapylton Chapman Bates Robinson
- Colonel William Heaton Horrocks, MB, Army Medical Service
- Colonel The Honourable Henry Yarde-Buller, MVO DSO
- Colonel Donald James MacKintosh, MVO MB, Army Medical Service
- Colonel James O'Hara, Army Pay Department
- Colonel Charles Cooper Reilly, Army Medical Service
- Colonel James Thomson, MB, Army Medical Service
- Colonel Arthur James Vavasor Durell, Army Pay Department
- Temp. Colonel Sir Walter Roper Lawrence, Bt
- Lieutenant-Colonel and Brevet Colonel James Rawdon Stansfeld, Royal Artillery
- Lieutenant-Colonel and Brevet Colonel Alban Randell Crofton Atkins, CMG, Army Service Corps
- Lieutenant-Colonel and Brevet Colonel George Herbert Stewart Browne, late Suffolk Regiment
- Lieutenant-Colonel and Brevet Colonel William St Colum Bland, Royal Artillery
- Surgeon Lieutenant-Colonel Peter Johnson Freyer, MD, Retired, Indian Medical Service
- Lieutenant-Colonel David Edward Wood, Remount Establishment
- Lieutenant-Colonel Thomas Horrocks Openshaw, CMG FRCS, Royal Army Medical Corps
- Lieutenant-Colonel Harry Gilbert Barling, FRCS, Royal Army Medical Corps
- Lieutenant-Colonel Henry Davy, MD, Royal Army Medical Corps
- Temp. Lieutenant-Colonel Sir Thomas Myles, FRCSI, Royal Army Medical Corps
- Temp. Lieutenant-Colonel Sir William Arbuthnot Lane, Bt FRCS, Royal Army Medical Corps
- Temp. Lieutenant-Colonel James Swain MD, FRCS, Royal Army Medical Corps
- Temp. Lieutenant-Colonel William Aldren Turner, MD, Royal Army Medical Corps
- Temp. Lieutenant-Colonel Sir Berkeley George Andrew Moynihan, MB FRCS, Royal Army Medical Corps
- Temp. Lieutenant-Colonel Robert Jones, FRCS, Royal Army Medical Corps
- Major and Brevet Lieutenant-Colonel Joseph Aloysius Byrne, late Royal Inniskilling Fusiliers
- Major and Brevet Lieutenant-Colonel Vernon George Waldegrave Kell, late South Staffordshire Regiment
- Colonel Charles Henry Selwyn, Indian Army
- Lieutenant-Colonel Patrick Balfour Haig, MB, Indian Medical Service
- Colonel Richard Joshua Cooper CVO, retired pay
- Lieutenant-Colonel and Brevet Colonel Ewen George Sinclair-MacLagan, DSO, Yorkshire Regiment
- Commander Neville Frederick Jarvis Wilson, Royal Indian Marines
- Colonel Patrick Hehir, CB FRCS, Indian Medical Service
- Colonel George Francis White, Royal Artillery
- Lieutenant-Colonel John Constantino Gordon Longmore, DSO, Royal Army Service Corps
- Major and Brevet Lieutenant-Colonel Bartholomew George Price, DSO, Royal Fusiliers
- Lieutenant-Colonel Alexander Egerton Dallas, Indian Army
- Lieutenant-Colonel Walter Percy Lionel Davies, DSO, Royal Artillery
- Lieutenant-Colonel Herbert William Studd, DSO, Coldstream Guards
- Colonel (temporary Brigadier-General) Herbert Southey Neville White MVO, Royal Marine Light Infantry.

Canadian Forces

- Colonel Herbert Stanley Birkett, Canadian Army Medical Corps
- Colonel James Alexander Roberts, Canadian Army Medical Corps
- Lieutenant-Colonel Patrick Joseph Daly, DSO, Canadian Infantry
- Lieutenant-Colonel John Edward Leckie, DSO, Canadian Infantry

New Zealand Force

- Colonel Sir Andrew Hamilton Russell, KCMG
- Colonel Robert Logan, New Zealand Staff Corps

===== Civil Division =====
- The Honourable Theo Russell, CVO, Private Secretary to the Secretary of State for Foreign Affairs
- Colonel John George Stewart-Murray, Duke of Atholl, MVO DSO Scottish Horse (Yeomanry)
- Lieutenant-Colonel Alfred Ernest le Rossignol, London Electrical Engineers
- Lieutenant-Colonel Ralph Edward Lyon, VD, 2nd South Midland Brigade, Royal Field Artillery, Lieutenant-Colonel and Honorary Colonel, retired, Territorial Force
- Lieutenant-Colonel George Savile Foljambe, VD, Nottinghamshire and Derbyshire Regiment Territorial Force Reserve
- Lieutenant-Colonel William Henry Stott, TD, The King's (Liverpool Regiment) Territorial Force Reserve, Military Member, West Lancashire Territorial Force Association
- Charles Robert Whorwood Adeane, President and chairman, Cambridgeshire and Isle of Ely Territorial Force Association, His Majesty's Lieutenant for Cambridgeshire
- Colonel John McAusland Denny, DL VD, Honorary Colonel, Argyll and Sutherland Highlanders (Territorial Force), chairman, Dumbartonshire Territorial Force Association
- Lieutenant-Colonel Henry Mellish, VD, late Major, Nottinghamshire and Derbyshire Regiment, Territorial Force, chairman, Nottinghamshire Territorial Force Association
- Major John Murray Reddie, DL, retired pay, Reserve of Officers, Secretary, Worcestershire Territorial Force Association
- Honorary Major-General Charles Gilchrist Jeans, retired, late Army Ordnance Department
- Honorary Major-General Thomas Preston Battersby, Inspector of Army Ordnance Services
- Brevet Colonel Arthur William Forbes, Embarkation Commandant
- Temporary Brigadier-General Albert Sydney Collard, Director of Inland Waterways and Docks
- Colonel Herbert Vaughan Kent, late Royal Engineers, assistant director of Fortifications and Works
- Colonel Thomas Elliott Carte, late Royal Artillery, assistant director of Artillery
- Colonel Walter MacAdam, late Royal Engineers, assistant director of Fortifications and Works
- Brevet Lieutenant-Colonel Philip William Temple Hale Wortham, Chief Inspector of Equipment and Stores, Army Ordnance Department
- Henry William Thomas Bowyear, Chief, Charity Commissioner
- Henry Fountain, CMG, Assistant Secretary, Commercial Department, Board of Trade
- Alfred Thomas Davies, Permanent Secretary, Welsh Department Board of Education
- Lieutenant-Colonel Ernest Dunlop Swinton, DSO, Assistant Secretary, Committee of Imperial Defence
- John Thomas Davies, Private Secretary to the Prime Minister and First Lord of the Treasury
- Franklyn Lewis Turner, Private Secretary to the President of the Local Government Board
- Frederick George Augustus Butler CMG, Principal Clerk, Colonial Office
- Philip Hanson, Director of Contracts, Ministry of Munitions
- Sigmund Dannreuther, Director of Finance, Ministry of Munitions
- Colonel Louis Charles Jackson, CMG, Controller Trench Warfare Division, Department of Design, Ministry of Munitions
- William Haldane Porter, Home Office
- Graeme Thomson, Director of Transports, Admiralty
- John Temple, Esq. (of Warrington).

=== The Most Exalted Order of the Star of India ===
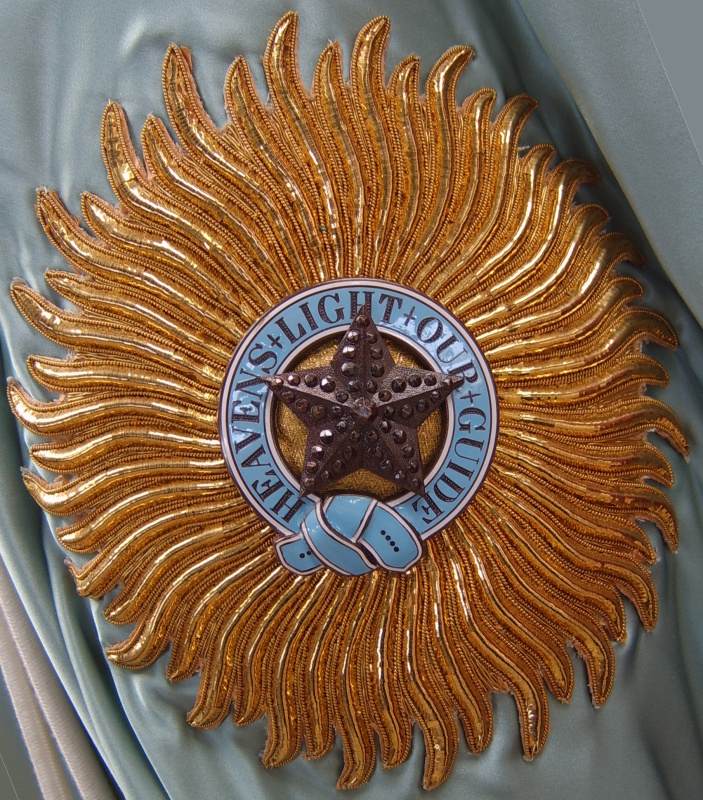
Star of a Knight Grand Commander of the Most Exalted Order of the Star of India

==== Knight Commander (KCSI) ====
- Claude Hamilton Archer Hill, CSI CIE, an Ordinary Member of the Council of the Governor-General
- His Highness Raja Malhar Rao Baba Saheb Puar, Chief of Dewas (Junior Branch), Central India
- His Highness Maharaja Jitendra Narayan Bhup Bahadur, of Cooch Behar, Bengal
- His Highness Jam Shri Ranjitsinhji Vibhaji, Jam Saheb of Nawanagar, Kathiawar, Bombay Presidency
- His Highness Maharaja Ghanshyamsinhji Ajitsinhji, Maharaja of Dhrangadhra, Kathiawar Bombay Presidency
- Lieutenant-Colonel Sir Francis Edward Younghusband, KCIE LLD DSc, Indian Political Department (retired)
- Sir Theodore Morison, KCIE, lately a Member of the Council of India
- Major-General George Macaulay Kirkpatrick, CB, Chief of the Indian General Staff
- Major-General Robert Charles Ochiltree Stuart, CSI, Director-General of Ordnance in India

Honorary Knight Commander

- Sir Bhim Shumshere Jung Bahadur Rana, KCVO, Commander-in-Chief in Nepal

==== Companion (CSI) ====
- Richard Burn, Indian Civil Service, Chief Secretary to the Government of the United Provinces and Oudh, and a Member of the Council of the Lieutenant-Governor for making Laws and Regulations
- Godfrey Butler Hunter Fell, CIE, Indian Civil Service, Financial adviser to the Government of India in the Military Finance Department
- Lieutenant-Colonel Cecil Kaye, CIE, Indian Army, Deputy Chief Censor in India
- John Henry Kerr, CIE, Indian Civil Service, Chief Secretary to the Government of Bengal, and an Additional Member of the Council of the Governor for making Laws and Regulations
- Colonel Wyndham Charles Knight, CB DSO ADC, Indian Army, Commanding, Bombay Brigade

=== The Most Distinguished Order of Saint Michael and Saint George ===
Star of the Order of Saint Michael and Saint George

==== Knight Grand Cross of the Order of St Michael and St George (GCMG) ====
- Sir George Vandeleur Fiddes, KCMG CB, Permanent Under-Secretary of State for the Colonies

==== Knight Commander of the Order of St Michael and St George (KCMG) ====
- Honorary Major-General James Melville Babington, CB CMG, Colonel, 16th Lancers
- Major-General Sir Alfred William Lambart Bayly, KCB CSI DSO
- Surgeon-General George Deane Bourke, CB
- Colonel John Thomas Carter, Army Pay Department
- Francis Drummond Percy Chaplin, Administrator of Southern Rhodesia
- The Honourable Jacobus Arnoldus Combrinck Graaff, Minister without Portfolio and Member of the Senate of the Union of South Africa
- Surgeon-General Richard William Ford, CB DSO
- The Honourable William Howard Hearst, Premier of the Province of Ontario
- Colonel Maurice Percy Cue Holt, CB DSO, Army Medical Service
- Major-General George Mark Watson Macdonogh, CB
- The Honourable Albert Edward Kemp, Minister of Militia and Defence, Dominion of Canada
- Major-General Sir Thomas Lethbridge Napier Morland, KCB DSO
- The Honourable George John Robert Murray, LLM, Lieutenant-Governor and Chief Justice of the Supreme Court of South Australia
- Arthur Robert Peel, His Majesty's Envoy Extraordinary and Minister Plenipotentiary to the United States of Brazil
- Colonel Samuel Augustus Pethebridge, CMG, Australian Force
- Lieutenant-General Sir William Pulteney Pulteney, KCB DSO
- Honorary Major-General Robert Pringle, CB DSO
- Colonel Sir John Steevens, KCB
- Major-General Sir Thomas D'Oyly Snow, KCB
- Francis Watts, CMG, Imperial Commissioner of Agriculture for the West Indies

Honorary Knight Commander

- Monsieur Charles de Rocca Serra, CMG, Legal Adviser to the Egyptian Ministry of Finance

==== Companion of the Order of St Michael and St George (CMG) ====
- Lieutenant-Colonel Arthur Russell Aldridge, CSI MB, Royal Army Medical Corps
- Lieutenant-Colonel James Howard Adolphus Annesley, DSO
- Lieutenant-Colonel Alexander George Arbuthnot, DSO, Royal Field Artillery
- Colonel Edwin Henry de Vere Atkinson, CIE
- Major Andrew Aytoun, DSO, late Argyll & Sutherland Highlanders
- Lieutenant-Colonel Norman Bruce Bainbridge, DSO, Army Ordnance Depot
- Lieutenant-Colonel and Brevet Colonel FitzGerald Muirson Banister, Royal Field Artillery
- Lieutenant-Colonel Harold Percy Waller Barrow, Royal Army Medical Corps
- Lieutenant-Colonel William Belk, late Dragoon Guards
- Rev. John Turnbull Bird, MA, Royal Army Chaplains' Department
- Lieutenant-Colonel John Campbell Lament Black, Army Service Corps
- Lieutenant-Colonel Everard McLeod Blair, Royal Engineers
- Lieutenant-Colonel Harry Simonds de Brett, DSO, Royal Artillery
- Lieutenant-Colonel Christopher Brooke, DSO, Yorkshire Light Infantry
- Lieutenant-Colonel Harry Edwin Bruce Bruce-Porter, Royal Army Medical Corps
- Lieutenant-Colonel and Brevet Colonel Charles Edward Dutton Budworth, CB MVO
- Major-General Benjamin Burton, CB
- Lieutenant-Colonel Ferberd Richard Buswell, Royal Army Medical Corps
- Major and Brevet Lieutenant-Colonel Frederick Joseph Byrne, late Connaught Rangers
- Major and Brevet Lieutenant-Colonel Charles Lionel Kirwan Campbell, Lancers
- Colonel Duncan Campbell Carter CB
- Lieutenant-Colonel Charles Watson Clark, Royal Garrison Artillery
- Lieutenant-Colonel Henry Hercules Cobbe, DSO, Indian Army
- Lieutenant-Colonel and Brevet Colonel Charles Edward Coghill, Royal Artillery
- Honorary Lieutenant-Colonel John Dewar Cormack, General List
- Colonel Edward Reginald Courtenay, CB
- Lieutenant-Colonel Robert Annesley Craig, Royal Artillery
- Colonel Thomas Daly, Royal Army Medical Corps
- Major and Brevet Lieutenant-Colonel Warburton Edward Davies, Rifle Brigade
- Lieutenant-Colonel Henry Davies, Army Service Corps
- Honorary Colonel Archibald Campbell Douglas Dick, CB, Argyll and Sutherland Highlanders
- Colonel Arthur John William Dowell
- Major George William Dowell, North Lancashire Regiment
- Lieutenant-Colonel Francis Ferguson Duffus, Army Service Corps
- Temp Lieutenant-Colonel Herbert Lightfoot Eason, MD, Royal Army Medical Corps
- Colonel FitzJames Maine Edwards, DSO, Indian Army
- Temp Colonel Thomas Crisp English, MB FRCS, Army Medical Service
- Colonel Henry Joseph Everett, CB
- Major and Brevet Lieutenant-Colonel Cecil Fane, DSO, Lancers, attd. Nottinghamshire & Derbyshire Regiment
- Lieutenant-Colonel Reginald Winnington Fanshawe, Army Pay Department
- Lieutenant-Colonel Wemyss Gawne Cunningham Feilden, Army Pay Department
- Colonel Henry Thomas Fenwick, MVO DSO, Middlesex Regiment
- Lieutenant-Colonel John David Ferguson, DSO, Royal Army Medical Corps
- Major and Brevet Lieutenant-Colonel Hugh Clifford Fernyhough, DSO, Army Ordnance Depot
- Lieutenant-Colonel Alexander William Frederick, Lord Saltoun, retired, late Grenadier Guards
- Lieutenant-Colonel Henry Francis Fraser, DSO, Lancers
- Colonel George Arthur French
- Lieutenant-Colonel Robert Strickland Hannay Fuhr, DSO, Royal Army Medical Corps
- Major Harry Townsend Fulton, DSO, Indian Army
- Major and Brevet Lieutenant-Colonel William James Theodore Glasgow, Royal West Surrey Regiment
- Colonel Charles Godby
- Lieutenant-Colonel Herbert Gordon, DSO, Leicestershire Regiment
- Colonel William Lewis Gray, MB, Royal Army Medical Corps
- Lieutenant-Colonel Henry Guy Fulljames Savage Gregson, Army Ordnance Depot
- Colonel Reginald Parker Grove
- Major George Lovell Gulland, FRCP, Royal Army Medical Corps
- Major Sir Charles Vere Gunning, Bt, Remount Service, late Durham Light Infantry
- The Right Rev. Bishop Llewellyn Henry Gwynne, DD, Deputy Chaplain General
- Colonel Neil Wolseley Haig
- Lieutenant-Colonel Percy Douglas Hamilton, Royal Artillery
- Colonel Arthur Clifton Hansard
- Major and Brevet Lieutenant-Colonel Kenneth Edward Haynes, Royal Artillery
- Lieutenant-Colonel Edward Sidney Herbert, Royal Highlanders, employed Egyptian Army
- Colonel Henry Cecil de la Montague Hill, CB
- Colonel Edmund Arthur Ponsonby Hobday, Royal Field Artillery
- Temp Lieutenant-Colonel Gordon Morgan Holmes, MD, Royal Army Medical Corps
- Major Bertram Hopkinson, MIEE MICE, Officers Training Corps
- Major-General Henry Byron Jeffreys, CB
- Lieutenant-Colonel Arthur Stawell Jenour, Royal Garrison Artillery
- Colonel Richard Orlando Kellett
- Major Tom Kelly, Royal Engineers
- Lieutenant-Colonel Arthur Durham Kirby, Royal Artillery
- Colonel Henry Thomas Knaggs, MB, Army Medical Service
- Lieutenant-Colonel John William Fraser Lament, DSO, Royal Horse Artillery
- Colonel Herbert Edward Bruce Lane
- Colonel Robert St. Clair Lecky, CB
- Major John Stewart Liddell, DSO
- Temp. Lieutenant-Colonel John Hall Seymour Lloyd, Special List
- Temp. Honorary Lieutenant-Colonel John Lynn-Thomas, CB FRCS, Royal Army Medical Corps
- Major and Brevet Lieutenant-Colonel Duncan Sayre MacInnes, DSO, Royal Engineers
- Colonel Ernest William Stuart King Maconchy, CB CIE DSO, Retired
- Major Lord Robert William Orlando Manners, DSO, King's Royal Rifle Corps
- Lieutenant-Colonel Thomas Edward Marshall, Royal Artillery
- Lieutenant-Colonel and Brevet Colonel William George Massy
- Lieutenant-Colonel Laurence Lockhart Maxwell, Indian Army
- Major and Brevet Lieutenant-Colonel Robert Henry McVittie, Army Ordnance Depot
- Major Lionel Charles Patrick Milman, Royal Artillery
- Colonel Frederick James Morgan, Army Medical Service
- Temp Major Sir William Thomson Morison, KCSI, Army Ordnance Depot
- Major and Brevet Lieutenant-Colonel William Patrick Eric Newbigging, DSO, Manchester Regiment
- Colonel Foster Reuss Newland, MB, Army Medical Service
- Lieutenant-Colonel Cuthbert Cecil Noott, DSO, Royal Artillery
- Colonel Robert Arthur Nugent, CB
- Lieutenant-Colonel John Spencer Ollivant, DSO, Royal Artillery
- Colonel William Henry Onslow, CB
- Temp Lieutenant-Colonel Hercules Arthur Pakenham, Royal Irish Rifles
- Lieutenant-Colonel Herbert Chidgey Brine Payne, Army Pay Department
- Temp. Lieutenant-Colonel George Sherwin Hooke Pearson, late Northamptonshire Regiment
- Colonel and Honorary Brigadier-General Cooper Penrose, CB
- Major-General Arthur Pole Penton, CVO CB
- Major Harold Franz Passawer Percival, DSO, Army Service Corps
- Lieutenant-Colonel and Brevet Colonel Cecil Edward Pereira, Coldstream Guards
- Lieutenant-Colonel Thomas Richmond Phillips, Royal Garrison Artillery
- Lieutenant-Colonel and Brevet Colonel William Harry Percival Plomer, Royal Irish Fusiliers
- Colonel Herbert Innes Pocock, Royal Army Medical Corps
- Lieutenant-Colonel Frederick Cuthbert Poole, DSO
- Lieutenant-Colonel Gerald Robert Poole, Royal Marine Artillery
- Lieutenant-Colonel William Wippell Pope, late Royal Army Medical Corps
- Major and Brevet Lieutenant-Colonel Harry Lionel Pritchard, DSO, Royal Engineers
- Lieutenant-Colonel David William Purdon, Indian Army
- Colonel Robert Maximilian Rainey-Robinson CB, Indian Army
- Major Harry Stuart Ravenhill, Army Pay Department
- Lieutenant-Colonel and Brevet Colonel Claude Rawnsley, DSO, Army Service Corps
- Captain Ambrose St. Quintin Ricardo, DSO
- Major and Brevet Lieutenant-Colonel Rupert Farquhar Riley, DSO, Yorkshire Light Infantry
- Major Walter Leslie Rocke, Wiltshire Regiment
- Lieutenant-Colonel and Brevet Colonel Cecil Francis Romer, CB ADC, Royal Dublin Fusiliers
- Major-General Richard Matthews Ruck, CB
- Major and Brevet Lieutenant-Colonel Richard Tyler Russell, Army Ordnance Depot
- Lieutenant-Colonel George Herbert Sanders, DSO, Royal Artillery
- Colonel William Henry Savage, Indian Army
- Lieutenant-Colonel George Edward Sayce, West Lancashire Division, Royal Engineers
- Colonel Bertal Hopton Scott, Royal Army Medical Corps
- Lieutenant-Colonel Edwin Charles Seaman, Royal Engineers
- Lieutenant-Colonel John Shakespear, CIE DSO, Indian Army
- Lieutenant-Colonel Herbert Cecil Sheppard, DSO, Royal Artillery
- Temp Major John Sherwood-Kelly, DSO, Norfolk Regiment
- Major William Shirley, London Regiment
- Colonel Cameron Deane Shute, CB
- Colonel George Hamilton Sim, CB
- Colonel Hugh Montgomerie Sinclair, CB
- Lieutenant-Colonel Lionel Fergus Smith, MB, Royal Army Medical Corps
- Colonel Charles Wyndham Somerset, MVO, Indian Army
- Lieutenant-Colonel and Brevet Colonel Alexander Sprot
- Lieutenant-Colonel George Bradshaw Stanistreet, MB, Royal Army Medical Corps
- Lieutenant-Colonel Herbert Stewart McCance Stanuell
- Temp. Major Albert Gerald Stern, Machine Gun Corps
- Major and Brevet Lieutenant-Colonel Alexander Gavin Stevenson, DSO, Royal Engineers
- Lieutenant-Colonel and Brevet Colonel James Wilfrid Stirling, Royal Field Artillery
- Lieutenant-Colonel Arthur Uniacke Stockley, Royal Artillery
- Colonel and Honorary Brigadier-General Francis Gleadows Stone, CB
- Lieutenant-Colonel and Brevet Colonel Casimir Cartwright Van Straubenzee, Royal Artillery
- Colonel Harald George Carlos Swayne, Royal Engineers
- Major Walter Conover Symon, late Royal Artillery
- Lieutenant-Colonel Frank Albert Symons, DSO MB, Royal Army Medical Corps
- Lieutenant-Colonel and Brevet-Colonel Haydon d'Aubrey Potenger Taylor
- Lieutenant-Colonel Henry Melville Thomas, Royal Field Artillery
- Lieutenant-Colonel Charles Campbell Todd, Army Pay Department
- Lieutenant-Colonel Francis William Towsey, West Yorkshire Regiment
- Colonel and Honorary Brigadier-General Charles Prideaux Triscott, CB DSO
- Lieutenant-Colonel and Brevet Colonel Courtney Vor Trower
- Lieutenant-Colonel George Edward Twiss, FRCSI, late Royal Army Medical Corps
- Lieutenant-Colonel Allan Vesey Ussher, Scottish Rifles
- Colonel Bernard Rowland Ward
- Temp. Brigadier-General Fabian Arthur Goulstone Ware, Special List
- Major Harold Farnell Watson, DSO, Lancashire Fusiliers
- Colonel Thomas du Bedat Whaite, MB, Royal Army Medical Corps
- Lieutenant-Colonel and Brevet Colonel William Douglas Whatman, attached Remount Service
- Lieutenant-Colonel Hugh Davie White-Thomson, CB DSO, Royal Artillery
- Lieutenant-Colonel and Brevet Colonel Weir de Lancey Williams, DSO, Hampshire Regiment
- Lieutenant-Colonel and Brevet Colonel Edward Henry Willis, Royal Artillery
- Lieutenant-Colonel Frank Walter Wilson, FRCVS, Royal Army Veterinary Corps
- Temp Major Nathaniel Wilson, DSO
- Lieutenant-Colonel Francis Adrian Wilson, DSO, Royal Field Artillery
- Lieutenant-Colonel Samuel Henry Withers, MB, Royal Army Medical Corps
- Lieutenant-Colonel Frederic Woodall, Army Pay Department
- Major and Brevet Lieutenant-Colonel Charles Richard Woodroffe, Royal Artillery
- Colonel Robert Wallace Wright, MB, Royal Army Medical Corps
- Lieutenant-Colonel Arthur Davidson Young, late Royal Artillery

Australian Forces

- Colonel Robert Murray McCheyne Anderson, Staff, Australian Imperial Force
- Lieutenant-Colonel Charles Henry Brand, DSO
- Lieutenant-Colonel Alfred Button, Australian Army Medical Service
- Colonel Harold Edward Elliott
- Colonel John Keatly Forsyth
- Lieutenant Colonel Thomas Griffiths, DSO Australian Imperial Force, Administrative Headquarters
- Captain George Clifford Miller Hall, DSO, late Royal Engineers, Australian Imperial Force
- Lieutenant-Colonel James Heane, DSO
- Lieutenant-Colonel James Lyon Johnston, Australian Imperial Force
- Lieutenant Colonel Thomas William Jolliffe, Australian Imnperial Force
- Colonel Harry Beauchamp Lassetter, CB, Commonwealth Military Forces
- Colonel (temporary Brigadier-General) George Leonard Lee, DSO, Commonwealth Military Forces
- Colonel (temporary Brigadier-General) Gustave Ramaciotti, Commonwealth Military Forces
- Colonel (temporary Brigadier-General) John Staniey, Retired List, Commonwealth Military Forces
- Major Arthur Borlase Stevens, DSO, Australian Infantry
- Colonel Ernest Townshend Wallack, CB, Australian Imperial Force
- Colonel Robert Ernest Williams, Commonwealth Military Forces

Canadian Forces

- Lieutenant-Colonel Maurice Alexander, Canadian Local Forces
- Lieutenant-Colonel Edward Charles Hart, Canadian Army Medical Corps
- Lieutenant-Colonel Garnet Burke Hughes, DSO
- Colonel Huntly Douglas Brodie Ketchen
- Lieutenant-Colonel Edward Whipple Bancroft Morrison, DSO
- Colonel George Patterson Murphy, Canadian Local Forces
- Lieutenant-Colonel Robert Rennie, MVO DSO
- Lieutenant-Colonel James George Ross, Canadian Local Forces
- Honorary Colonel Rev. Richard Henry Steacy, Chaplain Service, Canadian Local Forces

New Zealand Forces

- Colonel Edward Walter Clervaux Chaytor, CB
- Colonel the Honourable William Edward Collins, MB MRCS, New Zealand Medical Corps

Colonies, Protectorates, etc.

- Edmond Howard Lacam Gorges, MVO, Administrator of the Protectorate of South West Africa
- Robert Johnstone, ISO, Assistant Colonial Secretary, Island of Jamaica
- Francis William Major, ISO, Chief of Customs, East Africa Protectorate
- Captain Edward Harrington Martin, Royal Canadian Navy, Captain-Superintendent of the Halifax Dockyard, Nova Scotia
- The Honourable James Mitchell, Minister for Railways, Water Supply and Industries, State of Western Australia
- Arthur Sampson Pagden, Controller of Revenue, Island of Ceylon
- Leonard Rodway, Government Botanist, State of Tasmania
- Charles Lane Sansom, Principal Medical Officer, Federated Malay States
- Claud Severn, Colonial Secretary of the Colony of Hong Kong
- Frederick Spire, Provincial Commissioner, Uganda Protectorate

Diplomatic and Overseas Residents

- William Andrew Betts, MD, Director of the Municipal and Local Committees of Egypt
- Ronald Hugh Campbell, of the Foreign Office
- Arthur Morison Chalmers, His Majesty's Consul-General at Yokohama
- Horace Dickinson Nugent, His Majesty's Consul-General at Chicago
- Esmond Ovey, MVO, First Secretary to His Majesty's Legation at Christiania
- Leander Gaspard Roussin, Financial Secretary to the Minister of Finance, Cairo
- Edward William Paget Thurstan, His Majesty's Consul-General and Chargé d'Affaires at Mexico City
- The Honourable Charles Henry Tufton, of the Foreign Office
- John Warnock, MD, Director of Lunatic Asylums, Egypt

=== The Most Eminent Order of the Indian Empire ===
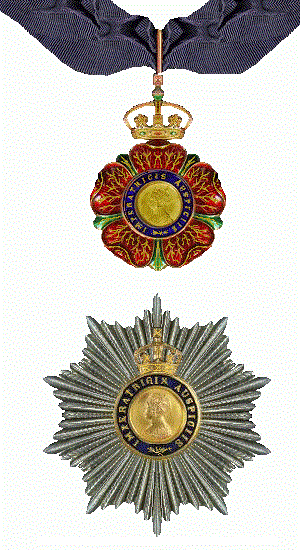
Riband, badge and star of the Knight Grand Commander of the Order of the Indian Empire

==== Knight Commander (KCIE) ====
- Robert Bailey Clegg, Indian Civil Service, First Member, Board of Revenue, Madras, and an Additional Member of the Council of the Governor for making Laws and Regulations
- Henry Wheeler, CSI CIE, Indian Civil Service, lately Secretary to the Government of India in the Home Department

Honorary Knight Commander

- Juddha Shumsher Jang Bahadur Rana, Commanding General of the Southern Division in Nepal

==== Companion (CIE) ====
- William Alexander, Traffic Department, Great Indian Peninsula Railway, Bombay
- Victor Bayley, Assistant Secretary, Railway Board, and Superintendent of Munitions, India
- Stephen Montagu Burrows, Secretary to the Oxford Delegacy for Oriental Students
- Lieutenant-Colonel Hugh Alan Cameron, Royal Engineers, Traffic Manager, North-Western Railway of India
- Percy Albert Churchward, managing director, Bank of Rangoon, Burma
- William Strachan Coutts, Indian Civil Service, Registrar of the Patna High Court, Bihar and Orissa
- Rao Bahadur Appaji Ganesh Dandekar, Honorary Magistrate, Thana District, Bombay
- Major William Edmund Ritchie Dickson, Royal Engineers, General Staff Officer, 1st Grade, Army Headquarters, India
- Lieutenant-Colonel John Herbert Dickson, Indian Army, Supply and Transport Corps, assistant director of Supplies and Transport, Bombay
- Commander William Ramsay Binny Douglas, Royal Indian Marine, Senior Military Transport Officer, Bombay
- Lieutenant-Colonel John Farmer, FRCVS, Indian Civil Veterinary Department, Chief Superintendent, Punjab
- Charles Francis Fitch, of Mussoorie, United Provinces of Agra and Oudh
- John Dillon Flynn, Goods Superintendent, Great Indian Peninsula Railway, Wadi Bunder, Bombay
- Major Edward Scott Gillett, Army Veterinary Corps, Personal Assistant to the Director-General, Army Remount-Department, India
- William Robert Gourlay, Indian Civil Service, Private Secretary to the Governor of Bengal
- Captain Ralph Edwin Hotchkin Griffith, Indian Army, Political Department, Assistant Political Agent, North-West Frontier Province
- Francis Sylvester Grimston, MICE, Superintendent, Rifle Factory, Ishapore
- Philip Joseph Hartog, lately Secretary to Departmental Committees on the Organisation of Oriental Studies in London
- Major Westwood Norman Hay, Indian Army, Commandant, Zhob Militia, Baluchistan
- Lieutenant-Colonel James Graham Hojel, MB, Indian Medical Service, Officer Commanding, Lady Hardinge War Hospital, Bombay
- Robert Erskine Holland, Indian Civil Service, Deputy Secretary (Political) Foreign and Political Department, Government of India
- Khan Bahadur Muhammad Aziz-ud-Din Husain, Sahib Bahadur ISO, Collector of South Arcot, Madras Presidency, and Special Agent, French Settlement, and Political Agent for Pondicherry
- William John Keith, Indian Civil Service, Revenue Secretary to the Government of Burma, and a Member of the Council of the Lieutenant-Governor for making Laws and Regulations
- Lieutenant-Colonel Norborne Kirby, Royal Engineers, Officiating Commanding Royal Engineer, 6th (Poona) Divisional Area
- Arthur James Warburton Kitchin, Indian Civil Service, Deputy Commissioner, Lyallpur, Punjab
- Temporary Major Robert Scarth Farquhar Macrae, Indian Police, Controller of Native Craft, Mesopotamia Expeditionary Force, and lately Commissioner of Police, Baroda State
- Henry Miller, a Member of the Council of the Chief Commissioner of Assam for making Laws and Regulations
- Diwan Bahadur Lala Bisheshar Nath, late Diwan of the Rajgarh State, Central India
- Major William Edmund Pye, 98th Infantry, Recruiting Officer for Jats and Hindustani Musalmans
- Major Sidney Mervyn Rice, 64tth Pioneers, Deputy Assistant Quartermaster-General, Army Headquarters, India
- Sardar Bahadur Bhagat Singh, Wazir of Poonch, Kashmir (posthumous)
- Major Claude Bayfield Stokes, 3rd Skinners Horse, General Staff Officer, 2nd Grade, Army Headquarters, India
- Charles Augustus Tegart, MVO, Indian Police, Additional Deputy Commissioner of Police, Calcutta
- Captain Drury St. Aubyn Wake, CB RN
- Captain Edmund Walter, Indian Army, Supply and Transport Corps, Deputy Assistant Director of Transport, Army Headquarters, India
- Lieutenant Duncan William Wilson, Indian Army Reserve of Officers, Assistant Embarkation Staff Officer, Bombay
- Lieutenant Edgar Clements Withers, Royal Indian Marine, Intelligence Officer, Persian Gulf
- Morris Yudlevitz Young, MB, Medical Officer at the Oil Fields, Persian Gulf
- Lieutenant-Colonel Henry Alfred Young, Royal Artillery, Director of Ordnance Inspection, India

=== Imperial Order of the Crown of India ===
- Marie Adelaide Freeman-Thomas, Baroness Willingdon, wife of Sir Freeman Freeman-Thomas, Baron Willingdon GCIE, Governor of the Presidency of Bombay

=== The Royal Victorian Order ===
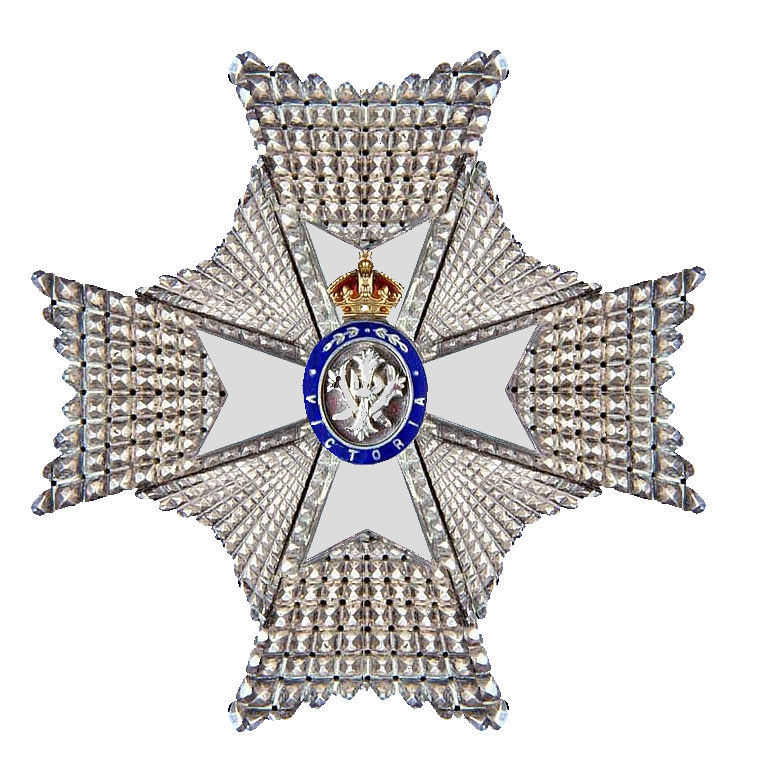
Insignia of a Knight / Dames Commander of the Royal Victorian Order

==== Knight Grand Cross of the Royal Victorian Order (GCVO) ====
- Alexander Hugh Bruce, Baron Balfour of Burleigh, KT GCMG
- Luke Henry White, Baron Annaly, KCVO, Permanent Lord-in-waiting to His Majesty

==== Knight Commander of the Royal Victorian Order (KCVO) ====
- Richard Farrer Herschell, Baron Herschell, MVO, Lord-in-Waiting to His Majesty
- The Honourable John Hubert Ward, CVO, Extra Equerry to His Majesty and Equerry to Her Majesty Queen Alexandra
- The Honourable Alexander Nelson Hood, CVO, Treasurer to Her Majesty the Queen
- Sir Robert William Burnet, Physician to His Majesty's Household

==== Commander of the Royal Victorian Order (CVO) ====
- The Honourable John William Fortescue, MVO, Librarian to His Majesty
- Sir Walter Parratt, MVO, Master of the Music to His Majesty
- Sir Cecil Harcourt-Smith, Director and Secretary, Victoria and Albert Museum
- The Rev. Mortimer Egerton Kennedy, MVO, Chaplain-in-Ordinary to His Majesty, and Chaplain to His Majesty's Legation, Copenhagen
- Robert Addison Smith, MVO
- John George Griffiths, MVO, Honorary Secretary, King Edward's Hospital Fund for London

==== Member of the Royal Victorian Order, 4th class (MVO) ====
- Walter Galpin Alcock, MVO MusDoc. Organist of the Chapels Royal
- Ernest Alfred Bendall, Examiner of Plays
- Francis Edward Raikes, King's Foreign Service Messenger

==== Member of the Royal Victorian Order, 5th class (MVO) ====
- Joseph Andrew Gardiner
- Albert Cox Legg

=== Royal Red Cross ===
==== First Class (RRC) ====
- C. Alcock, Principal Matron, Territorial Force Nursing Service (T.F.N.S.), 5th Southern General Hospital, Southsea
- M. L. T. Babb, Sister, Queen Alexandra's Imperial Military Nursing Service Reserve (Q.A.I.M.N.S.R.), Military Hospital, Dover
- A. I. Baird, Sister in charge, Q.A.I.M.N.S.R.
- M. Banfield, Matron, Q.A.I.M.N.S.R., Lord Derby War Hospital, Warrington
- E. Barber, Sister, Acting Matron, Queen Alexandra's Imperial Military Nursing Service (Q.A.I.M.N.S.)
- M. Bayldon, Matron, T.F.N.S., 4th Northern General Hospital, Lincoln
- I. C. Bennett, Matron, Met. Hospital, Kingsland Road, London
- H. Bigg, Matron, Charing Cross Hospital
- C. T. Bilton, Sister, Acting Matron, Q.A.I.M.N.S.
- A. M. Bird, Matron, Great Northern Central Hospital
- L. Bradburne, Matron, Meath Auxiliary Hospital, Dublin
- S. A. Brown, Matron, Q.A.I.M.N.S.R., Dartford War Hospital
- A. C. G. Buller, Administrator, Grouped Auxiliary Hospitals, Exeter
- M. Carruthers, Matron, Q.A.I.M.N.S.R., Pavilion and York Place Hospitals, Brighton
- L. O. Carter, Matron, T.F.N.S., 2nd Eastern General Hospital, Brighton
- H. Casault, Matron, Canadian Nursing Service
- A. E. Cashin, Sister, Q.A.I.M.N.S.R.
- M. H. Cave, Matron, Bury and West Suffolk Hospital, Bury St. Edmunds
- E. C. Cheetham, Matron, Q.A.I.M.N.S.
- M. Clements, Sister, Acting Matron, Q.A.I.M.N.S.
- L. A. Cowley, Sister, Q.A.I.M.N.S.R.
- E. R. Creagh, Matron, South African Nursing Service
- R. E. Crowdy ARRC, Principal Commandant, Voluntary Aid Detachment, France
- L. E. Cushon, Principal Matron, British Red Cross Hospital, Netley
- C. L. Cusins, Lady Superintendent, Queen Alexandra's Medical Nursing Service India (Q.A.M.N.S.I.)
- S. N. Daly, Sister, Acting Matron, Q.A.I.M.N.S.
- I. Davidson, Matron, Edinburgh War Hospital, Bangour
- G. T. Davis, Matron, 1st Western General Hospital, Fazakerley, Liverpool
- E. M. Denne, Sister, Acting Matron, Q.A.I.M.N.S.
- E. Dodds, Matron, Bethnal Green Military Hospital, Cambridge Heath
- A. Dowbiggin, Matron, Military Hospital, Edmonton
- E. Eddison, Matron, Royal City of Dublin Auxiliary Hospital
- D. Finch, Matron, University College Hospital, London
- M. M. Finlay, Matron, Australian Army Nursing Service
- E. E. Fletcher, Matron, 2nd Western General Hospital, Manchester
- G. Fletcher, Matron, Q.A.I.M.N.S., Richmond Military Hospital, Grove Road, Richmond, Surrey
- K. E. Flower, acting Sister, Nursing Staff of Civil Hospitals
- M. A. Foggett, Matron, Bradford War Hospital, Yorkshire
- J. I. Fortune, Sister, Acting Matron, T.F.N.S.
- A. M. Gilmore, Senior Nursing Sister, Q.A.M.N.S.I.
- M. Graham, Matron, Australian Army Nursing Service
- H. Haddow, Assistant Matron, T.F.N.S.
- G. R. Hale, Matron, Endell Street Military Hospital, London
- M. S. Hamer, Matron, Norfolk War Hospital, Thorpe, Norwich
- H. Hannath, Matron, T.F.N.S., 5th Northern General Hospital, Leicester
- H. Hare, Matron, Q.A.I.M.N.S., Military Hospital, Grantham
- M. L. Harris, Sister, Q.A.I.M.N.S., Military Hospital, Felixstowe
- A. J. Hartley, Matron, Canadian Army Nursing Service
- L. V. Haughton, Q.A.I.M.N.S., Nursing Board and Matron, late Guy's Hospital, London
- Miss Hezlett, Matron, Richmond Auxiliary Hospital, Dublin
- P. Hill, Matron, Adelaide Auxiliary Hospital, Dublin
- K. H. M. Holmes, Staff Nurse, Acting Sister, Q.A.I.M.N.S.
- L. M. Hubley, Matron, Canadian Army Nursing Service
- G. Hughes, Staff Nurse (Acting Matron), Q.A.I.M.N.S.
- E. T. Jacques, Sister, Q.A.I.M.N.S.R.
- E. W. Jayne, Sister, Q.A.I.M.N.S.R., Barnet War Hospital, Hertfordshire
- R. L. Jones, Officers Hospital, Dublin
- A. M. Kellett, Matron, Australian Army Nursing Service
- E. Kerr, Sister in charge, T.F.N.S.
- A. E. Kerslake, Matron, T.F.N.S., 1st Southern General Hospital, Edgbaston, Birmingham
- F. Knowles, Matron, T.F.N.S., 4th London General Hospital, King's College, London
- M. C. Laing, Sister, T.F.N.S.
- E. M. Lang, Sister, Acting Matron, Q.A.I.M.N.S.
- A. Lloyd-Still, Principal Matron, T.F.N.S., 5th London General Hospital, St. Thomas Hospital, London
- A. Macdonald, Acting Matron, T.F.N.S., 1st Eastern General Hospital, Cambridge
- E. Macfarlane, Sister, T.F.N.S., Malta
- L. E. Mackay, Sister, Acting Matron, Q.A.I.M.N.S.
- J. P. MacLeod, Matron, Nursing Service Reserve, Northumberland War Hospital, Gosforth, Newcastle upon Tyne
- F. Macpherson ARRC, Q.A.I.M.N.S., acting Matron, Military Hospital, Sutton Veny
- M. O'C. McCreery, Sister, Q.A.I.M.N.S., Military Hospital, Cork
- M. McDougall, Staff Nurse, T.F.N.S., Malta
- M. McGivney, Matron, Mater Misericordiae Hospital, Dublin
- A. McLeod, Sister, Q.A.I.M.N.S.R.
- A. Mclntosh, Matron, St. Bartholomew's Hospital, London
- C. Metcalfe, Matron, Graylingwell War Hospital, Chichester
- C. W. Millar, Matron, T.F.N.S., 2nd Scottish General Hospital, Craigleith, Edinburgh
- M. S. Milne, Matron, Q.A.I.M.N.S.R.
- G. E. Morgan, Matron, Middlesex Hospital, Clacton-on-Sea
- M. Morgan, Matron, Q.A.I.M.N.S.R., Military Hospital, York
- J. M. Murray, Sister, T.F.N.S.
- V. C. Nesbitt, Matron, Canadian Army Nursing Service
- A. B. Nunn, Sister, Acting Matron, Q.A.I.M.N.S.
- R. Osborne, Matron, Q.A.I.M.N.S.
- M. C. Parsons, Vice-chairman, Voluntary Aid Detachment, Central Selection Board, Glasgow
- M. G. Parsons, Matron, American Nursing Service
- B. F. Perkins, Sister, Acting Matron, Q.A.I.M.N.S.
- A. M. Phillips, Matron, Dr. Steeven's Auxiliary Hospital, Dublin
- M. L. Potter, Sister, Acting Matron, Q.A.I.M.N.S.
- G. Preston, Matron, T.F.N.S., 1st Northern General Hospital, Armsfrong College, Newcastle upon Tyne
- F. Price, Matron, New Zealand Nursing Service
- M. Priestman, Matron, T.F.N.S., 4th Southern General Hospital, Plymouth
- E. St. Quintin, Sister, Q.A.I.M.N.S., Kinmel Park Camp Military Hospital, Abergele
- E. C. Rayside, Matron, Canadian Nursing Service
- E. C. Rayside, Matron, Canadian Army Nursing Service
- E. T. Richardson, Matron-in-Chief, Australian Army Nursing Service
- G. Richardson, Matron, 3rd Western General Hospital, Cardiff
- M. Ritchie-Thompson, Sister, Q.A.I.M.N.S.R.
- K. Roscoe, Sister, Acting Matron, Q.A.I.M.N.S.
- E. Russell, Matron, Canadian Nursing Service
- E. F. Scott, Matron, Mill Road Auxiliary Hospital, Liverpool
- K. Scott, Matron, Royal Sussex County Hospital, Brighton
- K. G. F. Skinner, Sister, Acting Matron, Q.A.I.M.N.S.
- F. M. Smith, Matron, T.F.N.S., 2nd Southern General Hospital, Maudlin Street, Bristol
- M. E. Smith, Sister, Acting Matron, Q.A.I.M.N.S.
- M. Smith, Matron, Canadian Nursing Service
- C. S. Soutar, Sister, Q.A.I.M.N.S.R.
- M. Steenson, Sister, Acting Matron, Q.A.I.M.N.S.
- B. Stephenson, Matron, Q.A.I.M.N.S.R., Wharncliffe War Hospital, Middlewood Road, Sheffield
- J. R. Stevenson, Matron, Scottish National Red Cross Hospital, Bellahouston, Glasgow
- S. A. Stevenson, Matron, T.F.N.S., 3rd Northern General Hospital, Collegiate Hall, Sheffield
- E. Stewart, Matron, City of London Military Hospital, Clapton, London
- G. M. Stewart, Matron, Q.A.I.M.N.S.R., Northamptonshire. War Hospital, Duston, Northampton
- C. G. Stronach, Sister, Acting Matron, Q.A.I.M.N.S.
- C. I. K. Sunnier, Matron, Australian Army Nursing Service Reserve, Princess Christian Military Hospital, Englefield Green, Surrey
- E. E. Taylor, Matron, T.F.N.S., Merryflatts War Hospital, Govan, Glasgow
- E. O. Thomson, Matron, T.F.N.S., 4th Scottish General Hospital, Stobhill, Glasgow
- M. E. Thomson, Sister, Acting Matron, Q.A.I.M.N.S.R.
- M. M. Thorburn, Principal Matron, The Horton (County of London) War Hospital, Epsom
- M. Thurston, Matron-in-Chief, New Zealand Army Nursing Service
- C. A. Tisdell, Matron, Q.A.I.M.N.S.R., Stoke-on-Trent War Hospital
- L. M. Toller, Sister, Q.A.I.M.N.S.
- F. H. Tomlin, Matron, T.F.N.S., East Leeds War Hospital, Harehill Road, Leeds
- J. N. Miles Walker, Matron, Australian Army Nursing Service
- R. E. Wallace, Matron, Q.A.I.M.N.S., Southwark Military Hospital, East Dulwich Grove, London
- A. Weir, Sister, Acting Matron, Q.A.I.M.N.S.
- M. L. Whiffin, Matron, T.F.N.S., 2nd Northern General Hospital, Leeds
- G. L. White, Matron, T.F.N.S., 3rd Southern General Hospital, Oxford
- A. A. Wilson, Sister, Acting Matron, Q.A.I.M.N.S.
- F. Wilson, Matron, Canadian Army Nursing Service
- A. B. Wohlmann, Matron, Q.A.I.M.N.S., Malta
- I. Woodford, Sister, T.F.N.S.

==== Second Class (ARRC) ====
- G. Able (now Scudamore), Sister, Q.A.I.M.N.S.R., late Prees Heath Military Hospital, Salop
- E Addison, Sister, Royal Sussex County Hospital, Brighton
- M. Aherhe, Staff Nurse, Q.A.I.M.N.S.R., Military Hospital, Bagthorpe, Nottingham
- A. D. M. Alban, Staff Nurse, Q.A.I.M.N.S., Malta
- K. Aldridge, Nurse, T.F.N.S., 1st Eastern General Hospital, Cambridge
- A. Alexander, Sister, Graylingwell War Hospital, Chichester
- J. Alexander, Lady Superintendent and Matron, Royal Alexandra Infirmary, Paisley
- M. Alexander, acting Sister, Nursing Staff of Civil Hospitals
- M. Allbeury, Sister, Welsh Metropolitan War Hospital, Whitchurch, Cardiff
- A. D. Allen, Sister, Canadian Army Nursing Service
- W. M. Amos, acting Sister, Nursing Staff of Civil Hospitals
- J. K. Amour, Matron, Sunderland Royal Infirmary
- A. Anderson, Staff Nurse, Q.A.I.M.N.S.R., late Royal Victoria Hospital, Netley
- C. Anderson, Sister, 1st Western General Hospital, Fazakerley, Liverpool
- E. A. Arrowsmith, Sister, T.F.N.S., 1st Southern General Hospital, Edgbaston, Birmingham
- L. Badger, Sister, Acting Matron, Q.A.I.M.N.S.R.
- L. S. A. Ball, Staff Nurse, Australian Army Nursing Service
- M. W. Bannister, Sister in charge, Q.A.I.M.N.S.R.
- M. E. Barber, Nursing Sister, South African Military Nursing Service
- J. Barclay, Staff Nurse, Q.A.I.M.N.S.R., Royal Herbert Hospital, Woolwich
- F. M. E. Barnard, Sister in charge, Q.A.I.M.N.S.R.
- P. Barnard, Sister in charge, T.F.N.S.
- E. Barnes, Sister, Norfolk War Hospital, Thorpe, Norwich
- E. Barrett, Staff Nurse, T.F.N.S., 3rd Scottish General Hospital, Stobhill, Glasgow
- L. E. Barrow, Sister, Q.A.I.M.N.S.R.
- H. M. Barry, Sister, British Red Cross Society
- A. Barton, Matron, Australian Army Nursing Service
- M. Barton, Sister, Q.A.I.M.N.S.
- C. M. Batchdlor, acting Sister, Nursing Staff of Civil Hospitals
- M. Baxter, Matron, Coulter Hospital, 5, Grosvenor Square, London
- C. F. Bayley, Sister in charge, T.F.N.S.
- E. M. Beamish, Sister, Q.A.I.M.N.S.R.
- E. Bell, Sister, Q.A.I.M.N.S.R., Military Hospital, Ripon
- E. L. Bell, Nursing Sister, Canadian Army Nursing Service
- F. C. Bell, Superintending Nurse, Brigade Hospital, Newcastle
- J. C. Bell, Sister, Q.A.I.M.N.S.R., Royal Herbert Hospital, Woolwich
- E. F. Beloe, Matron, Q.A.I.M.N.S.R., Military Hospital, Herne Bay
- E. Bigger, Sister, Q.A.I.M.N.S.R., late Military Hospital, Tidworth
- A. E. Billington, Sister, T.F.N.S., 2nd Northern General Hospital, Leeds
- V. L. W. Bird, Staff Nurse, Q.A.I.M.N.S., Royal Herbert Hospital, Woolwich
- E. E. Bishop, Matron, Australian Army Nursing Service
- E. M. Bishop, Sister, Civilian Hospital, Reserve Military Hospital, Colchester
- M. Bissett, Staff Nurse, T.F.N.S., Scottish National Red Cross Hospital, Bellahouston, Glasgow
- G. J. Blacklock, Staff Nurse, Q.A.I.M.N.S.R.
- M. A. C. Blair, Sister in charge, Q.A.I.M.N.S.R.
- A. Blakesley, Sister, Military Hospital, Edmonton, London
- F. Blakestone, Sister, Q.A.I.M.N.S.R., Royal Victoria Hospital, Netley
- E. Blythe, Staff Nurse, Q.A.I.M.N.S.R.
- M. Bolderstone, Sister, T.F.N.S., 3rd Scottish General Hospital, Stobhill, Glasgow
- K. H. Bolton, Sister, Q.A.I.M.N.S.R., Wharncliffe War Hospital, Middlewood Road, Sheffield
- G. R. Bond, Acting Sister, Q.A.I.M.N.S.R., Pavilion and York Place Hospitals, Brighton
- E. Boultbee, Nursing Sister, Canadian Army Nursing Service
- L. A. Bourner, Sister, T.F.N.S., 1st London General Hospital, St. Gabriel's College, Camberwell, London
- E. H. Bousfield, Staff Nurse, Nursing Service Reserve, Northumberland War Hospital, Gosforth, Newcastle upon Tyne
- A. J. Bowman, Matron, Q.A.I.M.N.S.R., Military Hospital, Bovington, Hampshire
- E. L. Bramwell, Sister, Richmond Military Hospital, Grove Road, Richmond, Surrey
- M. Brasier, Matron, British Red Cross Society
- L. Brawn, Sister, Q.A.I.M.N.S.R., Malta
- E. E. Bray, Sister, Q.A.I.M.N.S.R., Military Hospital, Devonport
- E. M. Brooke, Sister, Q.A.I.M.N.S.R., Military Hospital, Tidworth
- A. Buckley, Sister, New Zealand Nursing Service
- E. Bullivant, Sister, The Queen's Hospital, Birmingham
- E. D. Bullock, Assistant Matron, T.F.N.S.; 1st Southern General Hospital, Edgbaston, Birmingham
- K. M. Bulman, Sister in Charge (retired list), Q.A.I.M.N.S.
- S. B. Burrell, acting Sister, Nursing Staff of Civil Hospitals
- W. E. Butcher, Sister, Q.A.I.M.N.S.R., Fort Pitt Military Hospital, Chatham
- G. Bygrave, Sister, Graylingwell War Hospital, Chichester
- D. T. Cackett, Sister in charge, Q.A.I.M.N.S.R.
- M. A. Cain, Sister, Q.A.I.M.N.S.R.
- M. N. Caird, Staff Nurse, Q.A.I.M.N.S.R.
- C. Cameron, Nursing Sister, Canadian Nursing Service
- J. C. Cameron, Staff Nurse, Q.A.I.M.N.S.R., Wharncliffe War Hospital, Middlewood Road, Sheffield
- M. Cameron, Sister in charge, T.F.N.S.
- F. Campbell, Staff Nurse, Q.A.I.M.N.S.R., Pavilion and York Place Hospital, Brighton
- B. Carley, Sister, T.F.N.S., 1st Eastern General Hospital, Cambridge
- C. Carmichael, Staff Nurse, The Horton, County of London War. Hospital, Epsom
- I. Carnaghan, Sister, Q.A.I.M.N.S.R., Kinmell Park Camp, Military Hospital, Abergele
- C. L. Carnegie, Sister, T.F.N.S.
- I. Carruthers, Staff Nurse, Q.A.I.M.N.S., Military Hospital, Caterham
- G. Carswell, Sister, Edinburgh War Hospital, Bangour
- G. Carter, Sister, Egginton Hall Hospital, Derby, and St. Thomas Hospital, London
- C. Carvel, Staff Nurse, Edinburgh War Hospital, Bangour
- H. C. Chalmers, Staff Nurse, T.F.N.S., 2nd Scottish General Hospital, Craigleith, Edinburgh
- G. W. Chamberlain, acting Sister, Q.A.I.M.N.S., Queen Alexandra Military Hospital, Grosvenor Road, London
- K. E. J. Chapman, Sister, Q.A.I.M.N.S.R.
- W. Chapman, Sister, Q.A.I.M.N.S.R., Military Hospital, Grantham
- Elizabeth Charles, Staff Nurse, Norfolk War Hospital, Thorpe, Norwich
- M. K. Chatterley, Assistant Matron, T.F.N.S., 1st Southern General Hospital, Edgbaston, Birmingham
- S. Cherry, Sister, 1st Western General Hospital, Fazakerley, Liverpool
- F. E. Child, Staff Nurse, Q.A.I.M.N.S.R.
- A. Clark, Sister, Q.A.I.M.N.S.R., Barnet War Hospital
- E. Clarke, Sister, Q.A.I.M.N.S.R., King George V. Hospital, Dublin
- E. V. L. Clarke, Staff Nurse, Acting Sister, Q.A.I.M.N.S.
- M. C. Clarke, Sister, Q.A.I.M.N.S.R., Military Hospital, Colchester
- M. Clarke, Staff Nurse, Q.A.I.M.N.S.R., King George Hospital, Stamford Street, London
- M. Clint, Nursing Sister, Canadian Nursing Service
- L. Clough, Sister, 2nd Western General Hospital, Manchester
- M. M. Cocking, Staff Nurse, Q.A.I.M.N.S.R., Military Isolation Hospital, Aldershot
- A. M. Collins, Staff Nurse, Q.A.I.M.N.S.R., Military Hospital, Frensham Hill, Farnham
- H. M. Connell, Acting Sister, Q.A.I.M.N.S.R.
- L. M. Cook, Sister, East Suffolk and Ipswich Hospital, Ipswich
- M. Cook, Staff Nurse, Huddersfield War Hospital
- E. S. Cooke, Sister in charge, T.F.N.S.
- S. Cooke, Staff Nurse, 2nd Western General Hospital, Manchester
- M. E. Cooper, Assistant Matron, Q.A.I.M.N.S.R., Military Hospital, Colchester
- H. O. Cooper, Sister, The Horton (County of London) War Hospital, Epsom
- A. M. Copper, Matron, Australian Army Nursing Service
- S. Corby, Staff Nurse, Q.A.I.M.N.S.R.
- E. Cornwall, Matron, Australian Army Nursing Service
- A. Cowie, Sister, Leith War Hospital, Leith
- M. Cowie, Sister (acting Matron), T.F.N.S.
- C. C. Cox, Staff Nurse, Q.A.I.M.N.S.R., Military Hospital, Fargo, Wiltshire
- G. Craig, Matron, T.F.N.S., 1st Scottish General Hospital, Aberdeen
- M. L. Craven, Staff Nurse, Australian Nursing Service, Lord Derby War Hospital, Warrington
- E. Creech, Sister, Q.A.I.M.N.S.R., The King George Hospital, Stamford Street, London
- M. H. Crooke, Assistant Matron, 1st Western General Hospital, Fazakerley, Liverpool
- M. R. O'H. Cussen, Sister, Mercy Hospital, Cork
- M. M. Dalrymple, Staff Nurse, Q.A.I.M.N.S.R., Military Hospital, Fargo, Wiltshire
- N. Dalrymple, Sister in charge, Q.A.I.M.N.S.R.
- M. Dando, Sister, 1st Western General Hospital, Fazakerley, Liverpool
- K. M. Daniel, Sister, 3rd Western General Hospital, Cardiff
- E. A. Davies, Sister, Gilroes Hospital, Leicester
- E. S. Davies, Sister, Q.A.I.M.N.S.R.
- J. Davies (now Nicholas), acting Sister, Q.A.I.M.N.S.R., Alexandra Military Hospital, Cosham
- K. Davies, Staff Nurse, New Zealand Nursing Service
- S. F. Davies, Staff Nurse, Acting Sister, Q.A.I.M.N.S.
- I. E. Dawson, Sister, Q.A.I.M.N.S.R., Royal Victoria Hospital
- Netley. R. Day, Sister, General Hospital, Birmingham
- L. P. Deakin, acting Sister, Nursing Staff of Civil Hospitals
- E. J. Densham, Matron, British Red Cross Society
- L. Dent, Commandant, Voluntary Aid Detachment, City of London
- E. I. Devenish-Meares, Sister in charge, Q.A.I.M.N.S.R.
- E. Devlin, Sister, T.F.N.S., 1st Southern General Hospital, Edgbaston, Birmingham
- A. Dickison, Sister, Canadian Army Nursing Service
- E. Dodd, Staff Nurse, T.F.N.S.
- C. C. Douet, Sister, Q.A.I.M.N.S.R., Park Hall Camp Military Hospital, Oswestry
- M. Dow, Acting Matron, Q.A.I.M.N.S.R., Military Hospital, Aylesbury
- E. Drysdale, Nursing Sister, Canadian Nursing Service
- B. M. Duff, Sister, Q.A.I.M.N.S.R., King George V Hospital, Dublin
- M. I. Duffus, Sister, Red Cross Hospital, Netley
- A. Dunbabin, Sister, Nell-lane Auxiliary Military Hospital, West Didsbury, Manchester
- A. Duncan, Sister in charge, Nursing Staff of Civil Hospitals
- J. Duncan, Sister in charge, Nursing Staff of Civil Hospitals
- J. Dunlop, Sister, T.F.N.S., 4th Scottish General Hospital, Stobhill, Glasgow
- G. Dunsford, Sister, T.F.N.S., 2nd London General Hospital, St. Mark's College, Chelsea, London
- E. Ealand, Staff Nurse, T.F.N.S., 1st Eastern General Hospital, Cambridge
- W. E. Eardley, Staff Nurse, Acting Sister, Q.A.I.M.N.S.
- B. M. W. Earle, Staff Nurse, Q.A.I.M.N.S.R.
- G. I. Echlin, Sister, Australian Army Nursing Service, Roy at Victoria Hospital, Netley
- J. B. Edgar, Assistant Matron, T.F.N.S., 4th Scottish General Hospital, Stobhill, Glasgow
- D. Edgley, Sister, T.F.N.S., 4th Southern General Hospital, Plymouth
- A. Edwards, Sister, Salford Royal Hospital, Manchester
- M. G. Edwards, Sister in charge, T.F.N.S.
- M. F. Eldridge, Staff Nurse, Australian Army Nursing Service
- R. Elliott, Sister, Worcester General Hospital, Worcester
- A. Ellis, Staff Nurse, Q.A.I.M.N.S.R., Malta
- E. C. Ellis, Sister, Q.A.I.M.N.S.R.
- M. P. Ellis, Nursing Sister, Canadian Nursing Service
- F. Ellwood, Sister, Canadian Army Nursing Service
- K. Elphick, Matron, The Lady Forester Convalescent Home, Llandudno
- M. Elsdon, Sister, The Horton (County of London) War Hospital, Epsom
- M. C. English, Nursing Sister, Canadian Nursing Service
- L. A. Ephgrave, Staff Nurse, Q.A.I.M.N.S. Retired, Malta
- J. I. Ettles, acting Matron, Q.A.I.M.N.S.R., Military Hospital, Sheerness
- B. Evans, Sister, T.F.N.S., 1st Southern General Hospital, Edgbaston, Birmingham
- E. G. Evans, Matron, Welsh Red Cross Hospital, Netley
- J. A. Evans, Sister, Q.A.I.M.N.S., Croydon War Hospital
- K. J. Fancourt, Sister, Q.A.I.M.N.S.R., Wharncliffe War Hospital, Middlewoodroad, Sheffield
- A. Farren, Sister, T.F.N.S., 2nd Eastern General Hospital, Brighton
- H. Ferguson, Matron, Gilford Branch Hospital, Belfast District
- M. S. Finlay, House Matron, County of Middlesex War Hospital, Napsbury, St. Albans
- L. M. Finlayson, Sister, T.F.N.S.
- M. C. A. Fishbourne, Assistant Matron, Q.A.I.M.N.S.R., Pavilion and York Place Hospital, Brighton
- M. Fitz-Henry, 1st Assistant Matron, The Horton (County of London) War Hospital, Epsom
- E. G. Fleming, Sister, Australian Army Nursing Service
- M. A. Fogarty, Sister, South Infirmary, Cork District
- A. Foley, Sister, 3rd Western General Hospital, Cardiff
- E. V. Forrest, Staff Nurse, Acting Sister, Q.A.I.M.N.S.
- H. L. Fowlds, Nursing Sister, Canadian Nursing Service
- S. H. Foxe, Sister, The Horton (County of London) War Hospital, Epsom
- S. A. Francis, Ward Sister, Royal Infirmary, Leicester
- E. C. Franklin, Sister, Q.A.I.M.N.S.R.
- A. W. Fraser, Acting Matron, Q.A.I.M.N.S.R., Military Hospital, Cromarty
- E. Fraser, Sister, Scottish National Red Cross Hospital, Bellahouston, Glasgow
- W. Furze, Sister, University College Hospital, Gower Street, London
- A. M. Gallop, Nursing Sister, Canadian Nursing Service
- E. Gardner, Sister, Brook War Hospital, Woolwich
- E. Gardner, Sister, T.F.N.S.
- J. S. G. Gardner, Sister, Q.A.I.M.N.S.
- W. M. Gedye, Staff Nurse, Acting Sister, Q.A.I.M.N.S.
- C. E. J. Gerry, Sister, T.F.N.S.
- M. Mel. P. Gibb, Matron, Smithson War Hospital, Greenock, Renfrewshire
- P. Gibbins, Sister, Q.A.I.M.N.S.R., Military Hospital, Ripon
- B. L. Gibbon, Sister, Australian Army Nursing Service, Royal Victoria Hospital, Netley
- J. Gibson, Assistant Matron, Scottish National Red Cross Hospital, Bellahouston, Glasgow
- F. E. Gill, Sister, T.F.N.S., 5th Southern General Hospital, Fawcett Road, Southsea
- P. M. Gill, Sister, Q.A.I.M.N.S.R., The Lord Derby War Hospital, Warrington
- N. C. Gillam, Matron, Q.A.I.M.N.S.R., Kinmel Park Camp Military Hospital, Abergele
- J. M. R. Gilmer, Sister, New Zealand Army Nursing Service
- F. M. Gittins, Sister, Q.A.I.M.N.S.R., The Lord Derby War Hospital, Warrington
- A. A. Glover, acting Sister, Q.A.I.M.N.S.R., Alexandra Military Hospital, Coshani
- H. M. Goldthorpe, Sister, Bethnal Green Military Hospital, Cambridge Heath
- M. C. Goodhue, Secretary, County of London Branch, British Red Cross Society, and Matron i/c City of London Red Cross Hospital, Finsbury Square
- L. Gordon, Sister, T.F.N.S., 1st Scottish Hospital, Aberdeen
- A. Grattan, Sister, Norfolk and Norwich Hospital, Norwich
- G. A. Gray, Nursing Sister, Canadian Nursing Service
- N. Gray, Sister, Edinburgh War Hospital, Bangor
- L. Greany, Sister, Q.A.I.M.N.S.R.
- G. E. Green, Sister, Q.A.I.M.N.S.R., Queen Mary's Military Hospital, Whalley, Lancashire
- J. Greig, Assistant Matron, City of London Military Hospital, Clapton
- D. Groom, Staff Nurse, Q.A.I.M.N.S., Dartford War Hospital
- J. E. Guffog, Staff Nurse, T.F.N.S., 2nd Western General Hospital, Manchester
- M. Hadow, Sister, T.F.N.S., 3rd Southern General Hospital, Oxford
- G. Haines, Nursing Sister, Q.A.M.N.S.I.
- E. Hall, Staff Nurse, T.F.N.S., 5th Southern General Hospital, Fawcett Road, Southsea
- J. A. Hannah, Sister, T.F.N.S., Malta
- A. M. Hanock, Matron, Australian Army Nursing Service
- C. E. Harley, Sister, Q.A.I.M.N.S.R., The Lord Derby War Hospital, Warrington
- E. B. Harse, Sister, Fulham Military Hospital, St. Dunstan's Road, Hammersmith
- A. Kidd Hart, Sister, Australian Army Nursing Service
- O. M. Hart, Sister, Q.A.I.M.N.S.R., Croydon War Hospital
- W. R. Harvey, Nursing Sister, Canadian Nursing Service
- A. Hassard, Sister, Bethnal Green Military Hospital, Cambridge Heath
- J. Hawson, Sister, Huddersfield War Hospital
- E. H. Hay, Matron, Q.A.I.M.N.S., Central Hospital, Hampstead Military Hospital
- M. E. Hay, Sister, T.F.N.S., 1st Southern General Hospital, Edgbaston, Birmingham
- M. Haynes, Nurse, T.F.N.S., 2nd Eastern General Hospital, Brighton
- G. E. Head, Staff Nurse, Q.A.I.M.N.S.R., Military Hospital, Bovington, Hampshire
- M. C. Headlam, Commandant Voluntary Aid Detachment Hospital, Quarry Place, Shrewsbury
- F. E. Healy, Matron, Military Hospital, Surrey Home, Seaford
- K. Hebdon, Asst. Matron, Northamptonshire War Hospital, Duston, Northampton
- M. Hendry, Sister, T.F.N.S.
- M. Herbert, Matron, Worcester General Hospital
- M. C. Herriot, Senior Asst. to Lady Superintendent of Nurses, Royal Infirmary, Edinburgh
- C. Highnam, Sister, Q.A.I.M.N.S.R., Cliffe Hotel Military Hospital, Felixstowe
- F. E. Hildyard, Sister, T.F.N.S., 2nd London General Hospital, St. Mark's College, Chelsea
- A. B. Hill, Matron, Q.A.I.M.N.S.R., Bath War Hospital
- E. M. Hine, Staff Nurse, Q.A.I.M.N.S.R.
- J. L. Hirst, Acting Sister, Q.A.I.M.N.S.R., Military Hospital, Frensham Hill, Farnham
- W. I. Hoare, Sister in charge, Nursing Staff of Civil Hospitals
- M. E. Hobhouse, Sister, Q.A.I.M.N.S.R., Military Hospital, Devonport
- E. Hodges, acting Matron, Q.A.I.M.N.S.R., Military Hospital, Reading
- E. Hodges, Staff Nurse, acting Sister, New Zealand Nursing Service
- L. Holland, Nursing Sister, Canadian Nursing Service
- A. Holmes, Staff Nurse, Q.A.I.M.N.S.R.
- M. E. Holt, Staff Nurse, T.F.N.S., 1st Southern General Hospital, Edgbaston, Birmingham
- C. Hood, Nursing Sister, Canadian Nursing Service
- M. Hopton, Sister in charge, Nursing Staff of Civil Hospitals
- E. Horridge, Sister, Q.A.I.M.N.S.R., Beaufort War Hospital, Fishponds, Bristol
- A. Horsfall, Sister, Q.A.I.M.N.S.R., Dartford War Hospital
- E. Horton, Sister, T.F.N.S., 1st Eastern General Hospital, Cambridge
- L. Hotine, Assistant Matron, Norfolk War Hospital, Thorpe, Norwich
- M. Houston, Sister, Q.A.I.M.N.S.R., Military Hospital, Tidworth
- M. R. Houston, Sister, Q.A.I.M.N.S.R., Queen Alexandra's Imperial Military Nursing Service Hospital, 71, Vincent Square, London
- A. Howard, Assistant Matron, T.F.N.S., 3rd London General Hospital, Wandsworth Common, London
- L. Howarth, Sister, Northamptonshire War Hospital, Duston, Northamptonshire
- M. Howe, Nursing Sister, Canadian Nursing Service
- M. Huffer, Staff Nurse, Nursing Staff of Civil Hospitals
- A. Hughes, Staff Nurse, T.F.N.S., 3rd Southern General Hospital, Oxford
- C. E. Hughes, Commandant Voluntary Aid Detachment Hospital, Oakley Manor, Shrewsbury
- M. J. Hughes, Staff Nurse, T.F.N.S.
- M. Huish, Sister, Q.A.I.M.N.S.R., Beaufort War Hospital, Fishponds, Bristol
- M. Humphrey-Jones, Acting Sister, Q.A.I.M.N.S.R.
- E. M. Humphries, Assistant Matron, T.F.N.S., 2nd Scottish General Hospital, Craigleith, Edinburgh
- F. A. Hunter, Sister, Canadian Army Nursing Service
- E. Hutchings, Sister, Q.A.I.M.N.S.R., Military Hospital, Curragh Camp
- S. J. Hutchinson, Matron, Coventry and Warwickshire Hospital, Coventry
- Sister Superioress Imelde, Mater Infirmorum Hospital, Belfast
- K. F. M. Jackson, Matron, Warneford and Leamington County Hospital, Leamington
- E. W. Jeffries, Sister, Australian Army Nursing Service
- M. Jennings, Sister, T.F.N.S.
- E. M. St. John, Sister, Q.A.I.M.N.S.R., Royal Victoria Hospital, Netley
- A. Johnson, Staff Nurse, T.F.N.S., 3rd London General Hospital Wandsworth Common, London
- C. V. S. Johnson, Sister, Q.A.I.M.N.S.
- A. E. Johnston, Sister, Canadian Red Cross, Malta
- M. C. Johnston, Sister, Q.A.I.M.N.S., Military Hospital, Frensham Hill, Farnham
- Marion Johnston, Acting Sister, Q.A.I.M.N.S.R.
- N. Johnston, Staff Nurse, T.F.N.S., Merryflatts War Hospital, Govan, Glasgow
- C. Johnstone, Matron, Woodside Central Hospital, Glasgow
- J. Johnstone, Nursing Sister, Canadian Nursing Sendee
- E. Jones, Matron, Infirmary Staff, St. Luke's War Hospital, Halifax
- F. A. Jones, Staff Nurse, 1st Western General Hospital, Fazakerley, Liverpool
- N. Jones, Sister, T.F.N.S., 2nd Southern General Hospital, Maudlin Street, Bristol
- J. Jordan, Matron, Mercer's Hospital, Dublin
- M. Kell, acting Matron, Q.A.I.M.N.S.R., Military Hospital, Reading
- A. Kelly, Lady Superintendent, Jervis Street Hospital, Dublin
- A. M. Kelson, Sister, T.F.N.S.
- A. A. Kemp, Staff Nurse, Australian Nursing Service, Lord Derby War Hospital, Warrington
- H. M. Kendall, Sister, T.F.N.S., 5th Northern General Hospital, Leicester
- J. V. M. Kennedy, Sister, Australian Array Nursing Service
- K. Kennedy, Sister, Royal City of Dublin Hospital
- C. M. Keys, Sister, Australian Army Nursing Service
- E. Killingbeck, acting Sister, Nursing Staff of Civil Hospitals
- R. G. Kind, Matron, Australian Army Nursing Service
- M. B. Kinloch, Matron, Leith War Hospital
- J. C. Kirkpatrick, Sister-in-Charge, T.F.N.S., York Hill War Hospital, Glasgow
- M. H. Klamborowski, Sister, Q.A.I.M.N.S.R.
- G. Knight, Matron, General Hospital, Nottingham
- L. Lane, Assistant Matron, Q.A.I.M.N.S.R., 2nd Birmingham War Hospital, Northfield, Birmingham
- C. Laurenson, Sister, Welsh Met. War Hospital, Whitchurch, Cardiff
- A. C. Lawson, Matron, Firvale Union, Sheffield
- N. Leake, Staff Nurse, Australian Army Nursing Service
- E. Leech, Sister, Q.A.I.M.N.S.R., Military Hospital, Pembroke Dock
- G. Lewis, Staff Nurse, T.F.N.S., 5th Northern General Hospital, Leicester
- B. O. Lidstone, Staff Nurse, Q.A.I.M.N.S.R.
- G. Litton, Sister, T.F.N.S., 5th Southern General Hospital, Pawcett Road, Southsea
- E. M. Logie, acting Sister, Q.A.I.M.N.S.R., Connaught Hospital, Aldershot
- E. M. Lovell, Staff Nurse, Q.A.I.M.N.S.R., Connaught Hospital, Aldershot
- M. M. Low, Matron, Springburn Woodside Central Hospital, Glasgow
- J. B. Lyle, Staff Nurse, T.F.N.S.
- M. Lytle, Sister, Meath Hospital, Dublin
- M. Macaffee, Nursing Sister, Canadian Nursing Service
- C. MacCallum, Matron, Dykebar War Hospital, Paisley
- J. M. Macdonald, Sister, Canadian Army Nursing Service
- J. Macdonald, Sister, T.F.N.S., Merryflatts War Hospital, Govan, Glasgow
- C. D. Macfie, Staff Nurse, T.F.N.S., 4th Scottish, General Hospital, Stobhill, Glasgow
- D. J. MacGregor, Staff Nurse, Q.A.I.M.N.S., county of Middlesex War Hospital, Napsbury, St. Albans
- C. I. Mackenzie, Staff Nurse, Bradford War Hospital
- H. A. MacLaughlin, Nursing Sister, Canadian Nursing Service
- C. Macleod, Sister, Acting Matron, Q.A.I.M.N.S.R.
- J. MacMaster, Matron, North Staffordshire Infirmary, Stoke-on-Trent
- C. L. MacNaughton, Sister, Q.A.I.M.N.S.R., Military Hospital, Victoria Barracks, Belfast
- M. Macrae, Matron, H.I.H. The Grand Duchess George of Russia's Hospital, Harrow
- A. Maddox, Sister, T.F.N.S., 5th Southern General Hospital, Fawcett Road, Southsea
- E. M. Malin, Sister, Q.A.I.M.N.S.R., Military Hospital, York, retired
- D. G. Mallet, acting Sister, Q.A.I.M.N.S., Military Hospital, Reading
- M. Manfield, Sister, T.F.N.S., 2nd Eastern General Hospital, Brighton
- F. E. Mansfield, acting Matron, Q.A.I.M.N.S., Military Hospital, Canterbury
- E. P. Mapstone, Sister, Q.A.I.M.N.S.R., Military Hospital, Sutton Veny
- A. Markwick, Sister in charge, Q.A.I.M.N.S.R., Military Hospital, Purfleet
- M. E. Marsh, Sister, T.F.N.S., 3rd Southern General Hospital, Oxford
- M. R. Marsh, Nursing Sister, Canadian Nursing Service
- C. H. Marshall, Sister, Australian Army Nursing Service
- E. F. Mason, Staff Nurse, Q.A.I.M.N.S.R.
- G. H. Mavety, Nursing Sister, Canadian Nursing Service
- M. Maxwell, Sister, British Red Cross Society
- M. Mayne, Sister, Great Eastern Hotel Military Hospital Harwich
- G. C. Maywood, Assistant Matron, British Red Cross Hospital, Netley
- M. A. McCabe, Staff Nurse, Q.A.I.M.N.S., Military Hospital, Lichfield
- F. McClelland, Staff Nurse, Acting Sister, Q.A.I.M.N.S.
- N. C. McCurdy, Nursing Sister, Canadian Nursing Service
- M. McIlwrath, Staff Nurse, Q.A.I.M.N.S.R.
- E. McMunn, Sister, Richmond Hospital, Dublin
- M. I. McNaughton, acting Sister, Q.A.I.M.N.S., Queen Alexandra's Military Hospital, Grosvenor Road
- H. McNulty, Sister, Q.A.I.M.N.S.R.
- M. M. McNulty, Sister, Australian Army Nursing Service
- G. B. McPherson, Nursing Sister, Canadian Nursing Service
- M. A. Meeke, Sister in charge, Q.A.I.M.N.S.R.
- M. Merriless, Sister, Q.A.I.M.N.S.R., Royal Victoria Hospital, Netley
- G. Miller, Sister, Q.A.I.M.N.S.R., Malta
- R. Miller, acting Sister, Nursing Staff of Civil Hospitals
- V. Mills, Matron Australian Army Nursing Service
- M. Mitchell, Sister, Q.A.I.M.N.S.R., Military Hospital, Pembroke Dock
- A. S. Moir, Sister, Dundee War Hospital, Mains Loan, Dundee
- E. Monteith, Staff Nurse, T.F.N.S., 5th Southern General Hospital, Fawcett Road, Southsea
- C. A. Morris, Sister, Q.A.I.M.N.S.R., Prees Heath Camp Military Hospital, Whitchurch
- M. E. Morris, Sister, Manchester Royal Infirmary
- J. E. S. Morrison, Sister, Q.A.I.M.N.S.R., Prees Heath Military Camp Hospital, Whitchurch
- M. Morrison, Q.A.I.M.N.S.R., acting Sister, Cambridge Hospital, Aldershot
- M. Motherwell, Nursing Sister, Canadian Nursing Service
- E. Mucklow, Staff Nurse, T.F.N.S., Malta
- C. Muirhead, Sister, T.F.N.S., 1st Scottish General Hospital, Aberdeen
- J. Murphy, Sister of Charity, North Infirmary, Cork
- E. Nicholson, Staff Nurse, T.F.N.S., 1st Northern General Hospital, Newcastle upon Tyne
- E. Nixon, Matron, New Zealand Army Nursing Service
- A. E. Noble, Sister, Q.A.I.M.N.S.R., Military Hospital, Dover
- M. Nunn, Staff Nurse, Q.A.I.M.N.S.R., Military Hospital, Sutton Veny
- A. O.'Neill, Staff Nurse, Q.A.I.M.N.S.R., Queen Mary's Military Hospital, Whalley, Lancashire
- K. O'Connell, Sister, Brook War Hospital, Woolwich
- A. O'Neill, Sister, Australian Army Nursing Service
- K. A. O'Reilly, Sister, Q.A.I.M.N.S.R., Military Hospital, Tidworth
- M. A. Oakley, Staff Nurse, T.F.N.S., Malta
- A. M. Pagan, acting Matron, Q.A.I.M.N.S., The Castle Military Hospital, Edinburgh
- I. R. Page, Sister, Southwark Military Hospital, East Dulwich Grove, London
- H. L. A. Parkinson, Assistant Matron, Q.A.I.M.N.S.R., retired, Military Hospital, Devonport
- L. M. Parr, Staff Nurse, Q.A.I.M.N.S.R., Fort Pitt Military Hospital, Chatham
- A. H. Paton, Q.A.I.M.N.S.R., Queen Mary's Hospital, Whalley, Lancashire
- E. Pearson, Staff Nurse, Isl Western General Hospital, Fazakerley, Liverpool
- F. Pearson, Sister, Q.A.I.M.N.S.R., Military Hospital, Bagthorpe
- M. Pedler, acting Matron, Q.A.I.M.N.S., Military Hospital, Magdalen Camp, Winchester
- E. Pemberton, Sister, 2nd Western General Hospital, Manchester
- M. C. Pemberton, Sister, Q.A.I.M.N.S.R., Royal Herbert Hospital, Woolwich
- E. F. Pense, Nursing Sister, Canadian Nursing Service
- N. Peplow, Sister, T.F.N.S., 4th London General Hospital, King's College, Denmark Hill
- A. H. Peppier, Assistant Matron, T.F.N.S., 2nd London General Hospital, St. Mark's College, Chelsea, London
- M. K. Perry, acting Sister, Q.A.I.M.N.S.R., Military Hospital, Reading
- E. Peters, Staff Nurse, T.F.N.S., 1st London General Hospital, St. Gabriel's College, Camberwell, London
- E. H. Phillips, Matron, Gizeh Hospital, Cairo
- C. Pierce, Sister, Q.A.I.M.N.S.R., Beaufort War Hospital, Fishponds, Bristol
- D. Pierse, Staff Nurse, Q.A.I.M.N.S.R., Royal Victoria. Hospital, Netley
- K. Platt, Matron, New End Section, Hampstead Military Hospital, London
- A. L. Plimsaul, Staff Nurse, Acting Sister, Q.A.I.M.N.S.
- M. G. Poole, Sister, T.F.N.S., 5th Northern General Hospital, Leicester
- I. J. Pooley, Matron, Q.A.I.M.N.S., Retired, Berrington War Hospital
- C. Porter, Sister, Leeds General Infirmary
- R. E. Potter, Sister, Chester Royal Infirmary
- K. A. Prendergast, Sister in charge, Q.A.I.M.N.S.R.
- J. Prentice, Sister, T.F.N.S.
- E. L. Preston, Sister, 1st London General Hospital, St. Gabriel's College, Camberwell, London
- I. Proskaner, Sister, Q.A.I.M.N.S.R., Chiseldon Military Hospital, Chiseldon Camp, Wiltshire
- L. Rea, Sister, T.F.N.S., 1st Northern General Hospital, Armstrong College, Newcastle upon Tyne
- S. M. Rea, Staff Nurse, Q.A.I.M.N.S.R., Malta
- K. Read, Sister in charge, Q.A.I.M.N.S.R.
- A. Reay, Matron, Darlington Union Infirmary
- B. J. D. Reid, Sister in charge, Q.A.I.M.N.S.R.
- M. Reid, Staff Nurse, Q.A.I.M.N.S.R.
- V. Reindorp, Sister, University College Hospital, Gower Street, London
- L. Remnant, acting Sister, Nursing Staff of Civil Hospitals
- C. B. Robb, Sister in charge, Nursing Staff of Civil Hospitals
- A. E. Roberts, Staff Nurse, T.F.N.S.
- C. Roberts, Sister, Q.A.I.M.N.S.R., Nottingham War Hospital
- E. Robertson, Sister, T.F.N.S., Malta
- J. Robertson, Nursing Sister, Canadian Nursing Service
- A. Robinson, Sister, T.F.N.S., 3rd Northern General Hospital, Collegiate Hall, Sheffield
- J. S. Rodger, Acting Sister, Q.A.I.M.N.S.R.
- E. Roethenbaugh, Sister, T.F.N.S.
- F. M. Rollinson, Sister, General Hospital, Croydon
- D. L. Rollo, Acting Sister, Q.A.I.M.N.S.R.
- M. Rose, Nursing Sister, Canadian Nursing Service
- O. Rose, Sister, T.F.N.S., 3rd Northern General Hospital, Collegiate Hall, Sheffield
- E. M. Ross, Sister and Deputy Matron, Welsh Red Cross Hospital, Netley
- E. D. Rush, Staff Nurse, Australian Army Nursing Service
- G. Rushforth, Staff Nurse, T.F.N.S., 1st Southern General Hospital, Edgbaston, Birmingham
- M. Russell, Matron, Australian Army Nursing Service
- B. Ryan, Staff Nurse, Q.A.I.M.N.S.R., Military Hospital, Reading
- C. Sandbach, Staff Nurse, Acting Sister, Q.A.I.M.N.S.
- Lady Sargant, Nurse, St. Anselm's Voluntary Aid Detachment Hospital, Walmer
- D. J. Saunder, Sister, Q.A.I.M.N.S., Mont Dore Military Hospital, Bournemouth
- A. M. Saunders, Nursing Sister, 3rd London General Hospital, Wandsworth Common
- E. O. Schofield, Sister in charge, Nursing Staff of Civil Hospitals
- A. Scott-Pullar, Staff Nurse, T.F.N.S.
- M. Scott-Watt, Staff Nurse, T.F.N.S.
- M. T. Sellar, Staff Nurse, Q.A.I.M.N.S.R.
- C. E. Shackell, Matron, Australian Army Nursing Service
- E. E. Simpson, Sister, 2nd Western General Hospital, Manchester
- E. R. Sloan, Sister in charge, T.F.N.S.
- A. P. Smartt, Sister in charge, Nursing Staff of Civil Hospitals
- A. E. Smith, Sister, Q.A.I.M.N.S.R., Military Hospital, Bagthorpe
- A. S. Smith, Sister, Q.A.I.M.N.S.R., The Lord Derby War Hospital, Warrington
- C. Smith, Staff Nurse, Q.A.I.M.N.S.R., Cambridge Hospital, Aldershot
- E. M. Smith, Matron, Nell Lane Military Hospital, West Didsbury, Manchester
- I. B. Smith, Nursing Sister, Canadian Nursing Service
- K. M. Smith, Assistant Matron, T.F.N.S., 2nd Southern General Hospital, Maudlin Street, Bristol
- M. B. Smith, Staff Nurse, Q.A.I.M.N.S., County of Middlesex War Hospital, Napsbury, St. Albans
- M. Smith, acting Sister, Q.A.I.M.N.S.R., Military Hospital, Eastbourne
- P. E. Smith, Assistant Matron, T.F.N.S., 2nd Northern General Hospital, Leeds
- R. A. Smith, Sister, Bradford War Hospital
- M. Somers, Sister, Dr. Steeven's Hospital, Dublin
- E. A. Sordy, Matron, Queen Mary's Hospital for the East End, Stratford, London
- F. H. Speedy, Sister, New Zealand Nursing Service
- V. Spencer-Jones, 1st Asst. Matron, Nelllane Auxiliary Military Hospital, West Didsbury, Manchester
- B. Spoor, Sister, T.F.N.S., 1st Northern General Hospital, Armstrong College, Newcastle upon Tyne
- E. Staveley, Sister, Stepping Hill Hospital, Stockport
- R. J. G. Steel, Matron, T.F.N.S., Cambuslang War Hospital, Glasgow
- E. Steggall, Sister, 3rd Western General Hospital, Cardiff
- A. B. Stevens, Staff Nurse, American Nursing Service
- G. L. Stevens, acting Sister, Q.A.I.M.N.S., Military Hospital, Colchester
- M. H. Stevens, acting Sister, Q.A.I.M.N.S.R., Cambridge Hospital, Aldershot.
- J. C. Stewart, Sister, T.F.N.S., 4th London General Hospital, King's College, Denmark Hill
- K. S. Stewart, Matron, County Hospital, York
- U. M. Stidston, Sister, Q.A.I.M.N.S.R., King George Hospital, Stamford Street, London
- E. Stone, Staff Nurse, T.F.N.S., 2nd Southern General Hospital, Maudlin Street, Bristol
- G. Stones, Sister, T.F.N.S., Malta
- I. D. Strathy, Nursing Sister, Canadian Nursing Service
- M. B. Street, Acting Sister, Q.A.I.M.N.S.R.
- E. M. Strikland, Matron, Australian Army Nursing Service
- E. Sutton, Matron, St. Vincent's Hospital, Dublin
- J. Taggart, Sister in charge, Nursing Staff of Civil Hospitals
- F. M. Tailer, Sister, T.F.N.S.
- M. C. Tawnay, Staff Nurse, Acting Sister, Q.A.I.M.N.S.
- A. Taylor, Sister, Adelaide Hospital, Dublin
- L. Taylor, Sister, Welsh Hospital, Whitchurch, Cardiff
- R. M. M. Taylor, Sister, Q.A.I.M.N.S.R., Military Hospital, Sutton Veny
- A. C. W. Teevan, Staff Nurse, Acting Sister, Q.A.I.M.N.S.
- G. Thacker, Staff Nurse, T.F.N.S., 4th Northern General Hospital, Lincoln
- M. Thomas, Royal Infirmary, Liverpool
- M. Thornton, Matron, Sir Patrick Dunne's Hospital, Dublin
- N. H. Thorpe, acting Matron, Brook War Hospital, Woolwich
- W. E. Tice, Sister in charge, Nursing Staff of Civil Hospitals
- M. E. Tilney, Nursing Sister, South African Military Nursing Service, South Africa Hospital, Richmond Park
- M. M. Timpson, Sister in charge, Nursing Staff of Civil Hospitals
- B. S. Tinkler, Sister, T.F.N.S.
- A. Tonneau, (Sister Superior, Euphemie), Kemptown French Convalescent Hospital, Brighton
- J. Townsend, Sister, T.F.N.S., 5th Southern General Hospital, Fawcett Road, Southsea
- K. D. Underwood, Matron, Q.A.I.M.N.S.R., Beaufort War Hospital, Fishponds, Bristol
- M. Veenan, Matron, Australian Army Nursing Service
- K. M. Vine, acting Sister, Q.A.I.M.N.S.R., Cambridge Hospital, Aldershot
- E. Wakeling, Matron, The Glen Voluntary Aid Detachment Hospital, Southend-on-Sea
- M. Walker, Sister, T.F.N.S., 4th London General Hospital, King's College, Denmark Hill, London
- M. Wallace, Sister, T.F.N.S., 2nd Scottish General Hospital, Craigleith, Edinburgh
- O. Walters, Sister, Territorial Force Nursing Service, 4th Northern General Hospital, Lincoln
- E. L. Ward, Sister, Q.A.I.M.N.S.R., Aldershot Isolation Hospital
- H. Ward, Assistant Matron, Territorial Force Nursing Service, 4th Northern General Hospital, Lincoln
- G. M. Watkins, Staff Nurse, Acting Sister, Q.A.I.M.N.S.
- E. M. Watmore, Sister, T.F.N.S.
- M. Watson, Staff Nurse, Q.A.I.M.N.S.R., King George Hospital, Stamford Street, London
- E. J. Watt, acting Sister, Nursing Staff of Civil Hospitals
- E. Webster, Staff Nurse, Q.A.I.M.N.S.R., Queen Mary's Military Hospital, Whalley, Lancashire
- L. E. Were, Assistant Matron, Q.A.I.M.N.S.R. (Royal Sussex County Hospital, Brighton), County of Middlesex Hospital, Napsbury, St. Albans
- M. A. West, Sister, Nursing Service Reserve, Northumberland War Hospital, Gosforth, Newcastle upon Tyne
- M. West, Assistant Matron, Australian Army Nursing Service Reserve, Malta
- A. E. Wharton, Sister, Q.A.I.M.N.S.R., Alexandra Military Hospital, Cosham
- H. M. Wharton, Nurse, Territorial Force Nursing Service, 2nd Northern General Hospital, Leeds
- K. V. White, acting Sister, Nursing Staff of Civil Hospitals
- I. M. Whyte, Staff Nurse, Acting Sister, Q.A.I.M.N.S.
- M. H. Wilkie, Sister, New Zealand Army Nursing Service
- E. Wilkinson, Sister, Territorial Force Nursing Service, 1st Scottish General Hospital, Aberdeen
- L. Willans, Civil Nurse, Infectious Hospital, Walkergate
- M. Willes, Staff Nurse, Acting Sister, Q.A.I.M.N.S.
- A. E. Williams, Sister, Lewisham Military Hospital, London
- B. M. Williams, Sister, Australian Army Nursing Service
- F. E. Williams, Staff Nurse, Australian Army Nursing Service
- M. S. Williams, Sister, Q.A.I.M.N.S.
- G. E. P. Williamson, Sister, Q.A.I.M.N.S.R., Croydon War Hospital, Surrey
- F. Wilson, Matron, New Zealand Army Nursing Service
- H. Wilson, Sister, The Horton County of London War Hospital, Epsom, Surrey
- M. Wilson, Acting Sister, Q.A.I.M.N.S.R.
- V. M. Wilson, Sister, Territorial Force Nursing Service, 5th London General Hospital, St. Thomas Hospital, Lambeth, London
- M. E. Wingate, Sister, Q.A.I.M.N.S.R., Fort Pitt Military Hospital, Chatham
- A. G. Wishart, Staff Nurse, Territorial Force Nursing Service, 1st Scottish General Hospital, Aberdeen
- A. H. Withers, Matron, Q.A.I.M.N.S.R., Guildford War Hospital, Warren Road
- M. Wolsey, acting Sister, Nursing Staff of Civil Hospitals
- E. M. Wood, Sister, The Horton (County of London) War Hospital, Epsom, Surrey
- M. D. Woodhouse, Sister, Q.A.I.M.N.S.
- T. M. Woodward, Sister, Q.A.I.M.N.S.R., Queen Mary's Military Hospital, Whalley, Lancashire
- M. E. Wragge, Sister, Q.A.I.M.N.S.R.
- M. J. Wray, Staff Nurse, Q.A.I.M.N.S.R., Queen Mary's Military Hospital, Whalley, Lancashire
- A. McD. Wright, acting Sister, Nursing Staff of Civil Hospitals
- M. I. Wright, Sister, Q.A.I.M.N.S.R., Queen Alexandra's Military Hospital, Grosvenor Road, London
- M. Wright, Sister, Alder Hey Auxiliary Hospital, Knottyash, Liverpool
- F. H. Wylie, Nursing Sister, Canadian Nursing Service
- E. A. R. Yockney, Staff Nurse, Q.A.I.M.N.S., Malta

=== Distinguished Service Order (DSO) ===
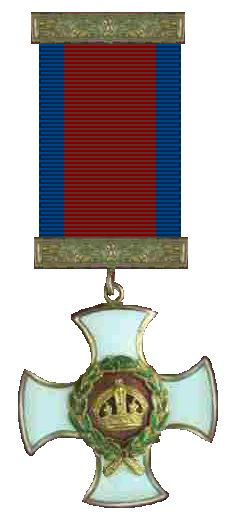
Riband and Badge of the Distinguished Service Order

- Captain Spencer Acklom, MC, Highland Light Infantry, attached Northumberland Fusiliers
- Captain Francis George Ager, Army Service Corps
- Major Charles Marshall Ainslie, Army Service Corps
- Major William Dallas Alexander, Royal Artillery
- Major John Grahame Buchanan Allardyce, Royal Field Artillery
- Captain Cecil Allen, Royal Field Artillery
- Major Harold Allen, Royal Artillery
- Temp Major George Coventry Alletson, Remount Service
- Major Edward Saunders Allsup, Royal Artillery
- Major Edward Philip Anderson, Royal Engineers
- Major William Bower Anley, Royal Garrison Artillery
- Captain William Henry Annesley, late Royal West Kent Regiment
- Major Henry Archer, Royal Artillery
- Captain Robert George Archibald, MB, Royal Army Medical Corps, employed Egyptian Army
- Captain Frank Rhodes Armitage, MB, Royal Army Medical Corps
- Major and Brevet Lieutenant-Colonel George Ayscough Armytage, King's Royal Rifle Corps
- Temp Major John Effingham Arnold, Army Service Corps
- Major Ralph Arnott, Royal Artillery
- Major Lionel Francis Arthur, Indian Army
- Lieutenant-Colonel Marcus Hill Babington, Royal Army Medical Corps
- Major George Badham-Thornhill, Royal Artillery
- Major Philip Robert Bald, Royal Engineers
- Major Harry Miller Ballingall, Royal Artillery
- Lieutenant Edgar James Bannatyne, Hussars and Royal Flying Corps
- Captain and Brevet Major Michael George Henry Barker, Lincolnshire Regiment
- Captain Leslie John Barley, Scottish Rifles
- Major Miles Barne, Suffolk Yeomanry
- Major and Brevet Lieutenant-Colonel William Henry Bartholomew, Royal Artillery
- Major William Hugh Barton, Army Service Corps
- Major John Holgate Bateson, Royal Artillery
- Captain John Beardmore Batten, Manchester Regiment
- Captain Victor Cecil Bawden, London Regiment
- Major Atwell Charles Baylay, Royal Engineers
- Major Edward Archibald Theodore Bayly, Royal Welsh Fusiliers, attached Egyptian Army
- Captain Winfred Kelsey Beaman, Royal Army Medical Corps
- Captain Frederick Arnot Beam, MC MB, Royal Army Medical Corps
- Major Cecil Morgan Ley Becher, Royal Irish Rifles
- Major John Harold Whitworth Becke, Nottinghamshire & Derbyshire Regiment, and Royal Flying Corps
- Temp Major Gawain Murdoch Bell, Hampshire Regiment
- Lieutenant-Colonel Richard Carmichael Bell, Indian Army
- Major William Cory Howard Bell, Royal Artillery
- Major William Bennett, MB, Royal Army Medical Corps
- Major Robert Benson, Royal Artillery
- Lieutenant-Colonel William Arthur Benson, Royal Army Medical Corps
- Captain and Brevet Major Denis John Charles Kirwan Bernard, Rifle Brigade
- Captain Valentine Oakley Beuttler, Army Service Corps
- Captain Reginald Ernest Bickerton, MB, Royal Army Medical Corps
- Major Maurice McClean Bidder, AMICE, Royal Engineers
- Major and Brevet Lieutenant-Colonel Harry Biddulph, Royal Engineers
- Captain Clarence August Bird, Royal Engineers
- Major Elliot Beverly Bird, Royal Army Medical Corps
- Captain Claud Hamilton Griffith Black, Lancers
- Major Robert Barclay Black, MB, Royal Army Medical Corps
- Temp Lieutenant-Colonel Stewart Ward William Blacker, Royal Irish Fusiliers
- Lieutenant-Colonel Robert James Blackham, CIE FFPS, Royal Army Medical Corps
- Major John Eaton Blackwall, Nottinghamshire & Derbyshire Regiment
- Captain John Blakiston-Houston, Hussars
- Lieutenant-Colonel Ernest William Bliss, Royal Army Medical Corps
- Major Conrad Edward Grant Blunt, Reserve of Officers
- Temp Major Thomas Henry Boardman, Royal Irish Fusiliers
- Major Sydney Alexander Boddam-Whetham, MC, Royal Artillery
- Lieutenant-Colonel Henry Hendley Bond, Royal Field Artillery
- Major Charles Bonham-Carter, Royal West Kent Regiment
- Major Aubrey Holmes Bolton, Gloucestershire Regiment
- Captain Francis Osborne Bowen, Royal Irish Regiment
- Major Claude Edward Syndercombe Bower, Royal Artillery
- Quartermaster and Honorary Major William Bowes, Lancashire Fusiliers
- Major Charles Edward Boyce, Royal Artillery
- Lieutenant-Colonel Harry Augustus Boyce, Royal Field Artillery
- Captain Ernest Charles Patrick Boyle, Honourable Artillery Company
- Major Edward Austen Bradford, King's Royal Rifle Corps
- Major Frederick Ewart Bradshaw, Rifle Brigade
- Major Robert Napier Bray, West Riding Regiment
- Captain William Basil Charles-Bridge, Argyll & Sutherland Highlanders
- Captain Eustace Carlile Brierley
- Temp Major Arthur Henry Daniel Britton, Army Service Corps
- Lieutenant-Colonel Henry Jenkins Brock, Royal Field Artillery
- Major Alan Francis Brooke, Royal Field Artillery
- Lieutenant-Colonel Edward William Saurin Brooke, Royal Artillery
- Captain Geoffrey Francis Heremon Brooke, MC, Lancers
- Major Frederick Brousson, Royal Artillery
- Major Charles Turner Brown, Royal Engineers
- Honorary Major and Temp. Honorary Lieutenant-Colonel Oscar Brown, Army Ordnance Depot
- Major Andrew Duncan Montague Browne, Royal Lancaster Regiment
- Captain George Buckston-Browne, Royal Field Artillery
- Major John Gilbert Browne, Hussars
- Major William Theodore Redmond Browne, Army Service Corps
- Captain and Brevet Major Guy James Brownlow, Rifle Brigade
- Major Kenneth Hope Bruce, Gordon Highlanders
- Major Robert Bruce, Gordon Highlanders
- Major John Handfield Brunskill, MB, Royal Army Medical Corps
- Major Alan Bryant, Gloucestershire Regiment
- Major Ronald Anderson Bryden, Royal Army Medical Corps
- Major William Napier Budgen, Royal Artillery
- Major John Dashwood Buller, Army Service Corps
- Major Richard Archibald Bulloch, Royal Highlanders
- Major Arthur Burdett Burdett, York & Lancaster Regiment, and Royal Flying Corps
- Captain Frederick Reginald Burnside, Hussars
- Major Colin Burton, Army Service Corps
- Temp Major Herbert Fulford Bush, Army Service Corps
- Major James Alexander Butchart, Royal Artillery
- Captain Patrick Richard Butler, Royal Irish Regiment
- Lieutenant-Colonel Frank Anstie Buzzard, Royal Field Artillery
- Major John Dillon Byrne, Royal Artillery
- Captain Thomas Algar Elliott Cairnes, Dragoon Guards, and Royal Flying Corps
- Captain Hector Mackay Calder, MB, Royal Army Medical Corps
- Temp Major Cecil Aylmer Cameron, Intelligence Corps
- Captain James Alexander Campbell, Suffolk Regiment
- Major Robert Campbell, Cameron Highlanders
- Major Ronald Bruce Campbell, Gordon Highlanders
- Lieutenant-Colonel George Ambrose Cardew, Royal Artillery
- Lieutenant-Colonel Harold Eustace Carey, Royal Field Artillery
- Captain Wilfrid Leathes de Mussenden Carey, Royal Engineers
- Major Charles Cattley Carr, Reserve of Officers
- Major George Arthur Buxton Carr, London Regiment
- Major Harrie Gardiner Carr, Royal Artillery
- Captain and Brevet Major Lawrence Carr, Gordon Highlanders
- Lieutenant-Colonel Frederick Fitzgerald Carroll, MB, Royal Army Medical Corps
- Captain Louis Alfred Latimer Carter, Army Service Corps
- Major Reginald Wingfield Castle, Royal Garrison Artillery
- Captain John Adrian Chamier, Indian Army and Royal Flying Corps
- Major George Arthur Emerson Chapman, East Kent Regiment
- Major Eric Montagu Seton Charles, Royal Engineers
- Lieutenant-Colonel Claud Edward Charles Graham Charlton, Royal Artillery
- Captain Sydney Herbert Charrington, Hussars
- Major Nigel Keppel Charteris, Royal Scots
- Lieutenant-Colonel William Frederick Cheesewright, Royal Engineers
- Captain William Arthur Vere Churton, Cheshire Regiment
- Major Craufurd Alexander Gordon Clark, London Regiment
- Lieutenant-Colonel Sir Edward Henry St. Lawrence Clarke, Bt, West Yorkshire Regiment
- Captain Edwin Percy Clarke, Suffolk Regiment
- Major Marshal Falconer Clarke, Cheshire Regiment
- Major Mervyn Officer Clarke, Royal Fusiliers
- Temp Major Frederick Holden Cleaver, Special List and Royal Flying Corps
- Lieutenant-Colonel Robert William Clements, MB, Royal Army Medical Corps
- Captain Percy James Clifton, Royal Field Artillery
- Captain George Charles Knights Clowes, London Regiment
- Major Percy Lionel Coates, Gloucestershire Regiment
- Captain Ralph Patteson Cobbold, North Lancashire Regiment
- Major Horace Walter Cobham, Liverpool Regiment
- Temp Captain Frederick Sydney Cockram, Middlesex Regiment
- Lieutenant-Colonel Clifford Coffin, Royal Engineers
- Major George Burdett Coleman, Army Service Corps
- Honorary Major John Richard Collacott, Army Ordnance Depot
- Lieutenant-Colonel Harold Collinson, MB FRCS, Royal Army Medical Corps
- Major Herbert William Allan Collum, Army Service Corps
- Captain Julian Campbell Colquhoun, Leinster Regiment
- Captain George Lethbridge Colvin, General List
- Major John Marcus Hobson Conway, FRCSI, Royal Army Medical Corps
- Major George Stanley Curtis Cooke, Royal Engineers
- Brevet Lieutenant-Colonel Herbert Fothergill Cooke, Indian Army
- Captain Myer Coplans, MD, Royal Army Medical Corps
- Captain Frederick Alleyne Corfield, Army Service Corps
- Temp Major Arthur Egerton Cotton, Rifle Brigade
- Major Frederick Harold Courtney, Royal Garrison Artillery
- Captain Malcolm Gordon Cowper, East Yorkshire Regiment
- Major Charles Henry Fortnom Cox, Royal Field Artillery
- Brevet Major Patrick Godfrey Ashley Cox, Rifle Brigade
- Major Waldemar Sigismund Dacre Craven, Royal Field Artillery
- Major Richard Parry Crawley, MVO, Army Service Corps
- Major Codrington Howard Rees Crawshay, Royal Welsh Fusiliers
- Temp Lieutenant-Colonel Basil Edwin Crockett, Hampshire Regiment
- Major William Denman Croft, Scottish Rifles
- Major Leonard Markham Crofts, Royal West Surrey Regiment
- Temp Lieutenant-Colonel James Dayrolles Crosbie, Lancashire Fusiliers
- Rev. Ernest Courtenay Crosse, Royal Army Chaplains' Department
- Temp Lieutenant-Colonel Frank Percy Crozier, Royal Irish Rifles
- Temp Major Charles Edward Cummins, Durham Light Infantry
- Major Thomas Cunningham-Cunningham, Royal Artillery
- Major Reginald Heaton Locke Cutbill, Army Service Corps
- Captain Henry Wolryohe Dakeyne, Royal Warwickshire Regiment
- Major Thomas Gerald Dalby, King's Royal Rifle Corps
- Major Frank William Daniell, Northumberland Fusiliers
- Major Frederic Gustavus Danielsen, Royal Warwickshire Regiment
- Major Robert Henry Darwall, Royal Marines, attd. Egyptian Army
- Major Hugh Allan Davidson, MB, Royal Army Medical Corps
- Lieutenant-Colonel Percy Matcham Davies, Army Service Corps
- Major George William Patrick Dawes, Royal Berkshire Regiment and Royal Flying Corps
- Captain Alan Geoffrey Charles Dawnay, Coldstream Guards
- Major John Day, Royal Engineers
- Captain Frederick Farrer Deakin, Yorkshire Hussars
- Major Arthur Cecil Hamilton Dean, Royal Garrison Artillery
- Major Henry Victor Mottet de la Fontaine, East Surrey Regiment
- Lieutenant-Colonel James George Dennistoun, Royal Field Artillery
- Major Philip Oliver Ellard d'Esterre, East Lancashire Regiment
- Rev. F. Devas, Royal Army Chaplains' Department
- Lieutenant-Colonel Richard Stretton de Winton, Royal Garrison Artillery
- Captain David Dickie, FRCS, Royal Army Medical Corps
- Captain Gilbert Henry Dive, Royal Army Medical Corps
- Temp Lieutenant-Colonel Frederick Alfred Dixon, Royal Field Artillery
- Major Arthur Curtis Dobson, Royal Engineers
- Major John Archibald Don, Royal Artillery
- Captain Ralph Charles Donaldson-Hudson, Reserve and Royal Flying Corps
- Major Frederic George William Draffen, Scottish Rifles
- Lieutenant-Colonel Gilbert Drage, Herefordshire Regiment
- Captain Godfrey Drage, Royal Munster Fusiliers
- Temp Captain John Steuart Duckett, Lancers
- Major Basil Lawrence Duke, Royal Artillery
- Major Charles Harold Dumbbell, Nottinghamshire & Derbyshire Regiment
- Major and Brevet Lieutenant-Colonel Frederick Charles Dundas, Argyll & Sutherland Highlanders
- Major Frank Passy Dunlop, Worcestershire Regiment
- Major Alexander Edward, Earl of Dunmore, VC MVO, Lancers
- Lieutenant-Colonel Henry Mason Dunn, MB, Royal Army Medical Corps
- Captain Francis James Du Pré, Hussars
- Major and Brevet Lieutenant-Colonel Bertie Cunynghame Dwyer, Leicestershire Regiment
- Captain Charles Edward Campbell Eagles, Royal Marine Light Infantry, Royal Marines
- Major Theodore Eardley-Wilmot, York & Lancaster Regiment
- Major Schomberg Henley Eden, Royal Highlanders
- Temp Major Francis Joseph Frederick Edlmann, Northumberland Fusiliers
- Captain Georgia Bennick Edwards, Royal Army Medical Corps
- Temp Major George Richard Owen Edwards, Royal Field Artillery
- Major Charles Allen Elliott, Royal Engineers
- Lieutenant-Colonel Otto William Alexander Eisner, Royal Army Medical Corps
- Major Henry Horace Andrews Emerson, MB, Royal Army Medical Corps
- Captain Cecil Loraine Estridge, West Yorkshire Regiment
- Captain Arthur Percivale Evans, King's Royal Rifle Corps
- Major George Farrington Evans, Royal Engineers
- Major Llewelyn Evans, Royal Engineers
- Major Edward Arthur Fagan, Indian Army
- El Bimbashi (Majajor) Ahmed Fahmi (Effendi), Egyptian Army
- Lieutenant Charles Herbert Fair, London Regiment
- Temp Lieutenant-Colonel Herbert Francis Fenn, Lancashire Regiment
- Major William Albany Fetherstonhaugh, Indian Army
- Major Kenneth Douglas Field, Royal Garrison Artillery
- Lieutenant-Colonel Robert Bainbridge Fife, Royal Garrison Artillery
- Captain Lionel Hugh Knightley Finch, Cheshire Regiment
- Major Arthur Francis Babington Fishe, Royal Garrison Artillery
- Major Herbert George Fisher, Royal Field Artillery
- Major and Brevet Lieutenant-Colonel FitzGerald Gabbett Fitzgerald, Royal Army Medical Corps
- Major Peter Francis FitzGerald, Shropshire Light Infantry
- Major Tudor FitzJohn, Worcestershire Regiment
- Major Ernest Richard Fitzpatrick, North Lancashire Regiment
- Captain and Brevet Major Victor Augustine Flower, London Regiment
- Captain William Percy Stilles Foord, Gloucestershire Regiment
- Major Athel Murray Hay Forbes, Royal Scots Fusiliers
- Major Ronald Foster Forbes, Highland Light Infantry
- Major George Norman Bowes Forster, Royal Warwickshire Regiment
- Major Ronald Thomas Foster, Nottinghamshire & Derbyshire Regiment
- Lieutenant-Colonel George Despard Franks, Hussars
- Captain Arthur Ion Fraser, Indian Cavalry
- Major Pierce Butler Fraser, Army Service Corps
- Major William Humphrey May Freestun, Somerset Light Infantry
- Temp Captain Laton Frewen, King's Royal Rifle Corps
- Major and Brevet Lieutenant-Colonel Cuthbert Graham Fuller, Royal Engineers
- Major John Frederic Charles Fuller, Oxfordshire & Buckinghamshire Light Infantry
- Major John Campbell Fullerton, Royal Field Artillery
- Captain Alexander Gallaher, Dragoon Guards
- Lieutenant-Colonel Henry Edward Garstin, Royal Artillery
- Major Gerald John Percival Geiger, Royal Welsh Fusiliers
- Major and Brevet Lieutenant-Colonel Richard Walter St. Lawrance Gethin, Royal Artillery
- Captain Bertrand Dees Gibson, Northumberland Fusiliers
- Major Stanley Edmund Hercules Giles, Army Service Corps
- Major Valentine Giles, Royal Engineers
- Major Douglas Howard Gill, Royal Field Artillery
- Captain Gordon Harry Gill, Army Service Corps
- Temp Major Hugh James Gillespie, Royal Field Artillery
- Captain and Brevet Major Reginald Henry Gillespie, Leicestershire Regiment
- Major Charles Richard Gillett, Royal Artillery
- Temp Major Valentine Edgar Gooderson, Highland Light Infantry
- Major William Richard Power, Goodwin, Royal Army Medical Corps
- Temp Lieutenant-Colonel Francis Lewis Eawson Gordon, Royal Irish Rifles
- Major Henry William Gordon, Royal Engineers
- Major Stewart Gore-Browne, Royal Artillery
- Major Charles Rhodes Gover, Royal Artillery
- Captain James Archibald Graeme, Royal Engineers
- Lieutenant James Neville Gray, Special List
- Major Walter Ker Gray, Royal Field Artillery
- Major Hugh Annesley Gray-Cheape, Yeomanry
- Major and Brevet Lieutenant-Colonel Arthur Frank Umfreville Green, Royal Artillery
- Major Herbert Walter Green, East Kent Regiment
- Captain Thomas Waring Bunce Greenfield, Irish Guards
- Major Hugh Gilbert Gregorie, Royal Irish Regiment
- Major Alfred John Reginald Gregory, Royal Garrison Artillery
- Temp Lieutenant-Colonel James Grimwood, South Wales Borderers
- Major Bernard Salwey Grissell, Norfolk Regiment
- Lieutenant-Colonel Sir Edward Ion Beresford Grogan, Bt, Rifle Brigade
- Major George Meredyth Grogan
- Major Thomas Thackeray Grove, Royal Engineers
- Major Percy Robert Clifford Groves, Shropshire Light Infantry
- Honorary Major John Grute, Army Ordnance Depot
- Temp Major Clement Henderson Gurney, York & Lancaster Regiment
- Major Graham Howard Gwyther, Royal Welsh Fusiliers
- Major Claude Henry Haig, Leicestershire Regiment
- Major William Haig, Royal Army Medical Corps
- Rev. John Percy Hales, Royal Army Chaplains' Department
- Major Edward Hall, Nottinghamshire & Derbyshire Regiment
- Major John Alfred Hamilton, Army Service Corps
- Major Robert Townsend Hammick, Royal Artillery
- Major John Connor Hanna, Royal Garrison Artillery
- Major Edward Lewis Hardcastle, Royal Garrison Artillery
- Lieutenant Steven James Lindsay Hardie, Argyll & Sutherland Highlanders
- Temp Lieutenant-Colonel Colin Harding, CMG, Royal Warwickshire Regiment
- Major Thomas Sheffield Newcombe Hardinge, Royal Garrison Artillery
- Lieutenant-Colonel Reginald Stanley Hardman, Royal Field Artillery
- Temp Captain John Hardress-Lloyd, Royal Inniskilling Fusiliers
- Captain Eric John Hardy, Dragoons
- Captain John Wilberforce Hare, Royal Garrison Artillery
- Captain Alfred Harris, Royal Field Artillery
- Captain Thomas Birkbeck Harris, Royal Engineers
- Major George Hyde Harrison, Border Regiment
- Temp Lieutenant-Colonel Geoffrey Barnett Harrison, Royal Marines
- Temp Major Herbert Parsons Hart, King's Own Scottish Borderers
- Major Thomas Ernest Harty, Royal Army Medical Corps
- Major Francis Henry Harvey, East Yorkshire Regiment
- Major William John Saundry Harvey, Royal Army Medical Corps
- Major John McDougall Haskard, Royal Dublin Fusiliers
- Captain and Brevet Major William Holland Hastings, Indian Army
- Lieutenant-Colonel Corlis St. Leger Gillman Hawkes, Royal Field Artillery
- Major William Cotter Williamson Hawkes, Indian Army
- Lieutenant-Colonel Frank Hawthorn, MD, Royal Army Medical Corps
- Major Arthur Kennet Hay, Royal Artillery
- Major John Higson Hayes, Shropshire Yeomanry
- Major Sydney Thomas Hayley, Army Ordnance Depot
- Temp Major William Muir Hayman, Royal Engineers
- Major Arthur Edward Maxwell Head, Royal Field Artillery
- Major Charles Octavius Head, Royal Field Artillery
- Major Gordon Risley Hearn, Royal Engineers
- Major Harry Esmond Henderson, Royal Garrison Artillery
- Captain and Brevet Major Malcolm Henderson, Royal Scots
- Major Godfrey Clement Walker Heneage, MVO
- Lieutenant-Colonel Philip Walter Beresford Henning, Royal Field Artillery
- Major William Norman Herbert, Northumberland Fusiliers
- Major Arnold Herklots, Army Service Corps
- Major John Edward Norfor Heseltine, King's Royal Rifle Corps
- Lieutenant-Colonel Henry Hewetson, Royal Army Medical Corps
- Major Alfred Scott Hewitt, Royal West Kent Regiment
- Temp Lieutenant-Colonel Arthur Augustus Inglis Heyman, Highland Light Infantry
- Captain and Brevet Major Sir Henry Blyth Hill, Bt
- Major Basil Alexander Hill, Army Ordnance Depot
- Major Henry Warburton Hill, Royal Field Artillery
- Captain William James Montagu Hill
- Lieutenant-Colonel Henry Charles Rupert Hime, MB, Royal Army Medical Corps
- Temp Major Henry Noel Hoare, Army Service Corps
- Major Andrew Edward Hodder, MB, Royal Army Medical Corps
- Captain Cyril Mindon Trower Hogg, Indian Army
- Major Charles Walter Holden, Royal Army Medical Corps
- Captain Henry William Holland, Special List
- Captain and Brevet Major Samuel Clifford Holland, late Dragoon Guards
- Captain William George Holmes, Royal Welsh Fusiliers
- Major Rupert Edward Holmes à Court, Shropshire Light Infantry
- Captain The Honourable Neville Albert Hood, Royal Garrison Artillery
- Major Richard Hovil, Royal Field Artillery
- Major Charles Alfred Howard, King's Royal Rifle Corps
- Lieutenant-Colonel Francis James Leigh Howard, Army Service Corps
- Captain and Brevet Major Henry Cecil Lloyd Howard, Lancers
- Captain Frederick Duke Gwynne Howell, MC, Royal Army Medical Corps
- Major Reginald Howlett, MC, Royal Fusiliers
- Brevet Lieutenant-Colonel Desmond Murree FitzGerald Hoysted, Royal Engineers
- Major Hubert Jervoise Huddleston, MC, Dorsetshire Regiment
- Lieutenant-Colonel Wilfrid Edward Hudleston, Royal Army Medical Corps
- Major Arthur Ross Hudson, Royal Field Artillery
- Captain Alfred Huggins, Royal Flying Corps
- Captain Walter Backhouse Hulke, York & Lancaster Regiment, Lincolnshire Regiment
- Major Charles Robert Ingham Hull, Army Service Corps
- Major Granville Vere Hunt, Repair Unit, Army Service Corps
- Major Thomas Massie Hutchinson, Army Service Corps
- Temp Major Vernon Montgomerie Hutton, Army Service Corps
- Major Robert Henry Edmund Hutton-Squire, Royal Garrison Artillery
- Major Dermot Owen Hyde, MB, Royal Army Medical Corps
- Captain George Bayard Hynes, Royal Artillery and Royal Flying Corps
- Major Osburne Ievers, MB, Royal Army Medical Corps
- Captain George Hastings Impey, Royal Sussex Regiment
- Major Edward James Inches, Royal Field Artillery
- Lieutenant-Colonel Charles St. Maur Ingham, Royal Field Artillery
- Major and Brevet Lieutenant-Colonel John Darnley Ingles, Devonshire Regiment
- Lieutenant-Colonel Edgar Thomas Inkson, VC, Royal Army Medical Corps
- Major Sydney Armitage Innes, Royal Highlanders
- Major and Brevet Lieutenant-Colonel Evan Maclean Jack, Royal Engineers
- Major Frank Walter Fitton Jackson, Royal Field Artillery
- Captain Vivian Archer Jackson, York & Lancaster Regiment
- Temp Lieutenant-Colonel Boucher Charlewood James, Devonshire Regiment
- Major Cecil Polglase James, Argyll & Sutherland Highlanders
- Captain Charles Frederic Jerram, Royal Marine Light Infantry
- Captain Edmund Percy Johnson, Royal Field Artillery
- Major Frederick Evans Johnson, Army Service Corps
- Major Henry Alexander Johnson, Army Service Corps
- Lieutenant James Gerald Thewlis Johnson, Yeomanry
- Major John Tyrer Johnson, MB, Royal Army Medical Corps
- Lieutenant-Colonel Ronald Marr Johnson, Royal Artillery
- Temp Major Thomas Henry Fielder Johnson, Dorsetshire Regiment
- Lieutenant-Colonel Thomas Pelham Johnson, Army Service Corps
- Captain John Herbert Johnston, Royal Garrison Artillery
- Captain Harry Llewellyn Jones, Hussars
- Captain Howard Percy Jones, Royal Field Artillery
- Captain Philip Bennet Joubert de la Ferté, Royal Artillery and Royal Flying Corps
- Captain Max James Auguste Jourdier, East Surrey Regiment
- El Miralai (Colonel) Beshir Kambal (Bey), Egyptian Army
- Lieutenant-Colonel Sydney Keen, Royal Engineers
- Major Harry Beatty Kelly, MB, Royal Army Medical Corps
- Major Philip James Vandeleur Kelly, Hussars, attd. Egyptian Army
- Major Waldron Harold Fletcher Kelly, Army Service Corps
- Captain Henry Herbert Kemble, MC, London Regiment
- Temp Major Donald Stuart Kennedy, Army Service Corps
- Captain Dennis Malcolm King, MC, Liverpool Regiment
- Temp Major Gilbert East King, East Yorkshire Regiment
- Major Gerald Hartley King, Royal Artillery
- Major John William Carnegie Kirk, Duke of Cornwall's Light Infantry
- Lieutenant-Colonel Kenneth St. George Kirke, Royal Field Artillery
- Major Travers Kirkland, Royal Field Artillery
- Major Roderick Mackenzie Knolles, Royal Artillery
- Lieutenant Hugh Knothe, MC, Army Service Corps
- Major and Brevet Lieutenant-Colonel Harry Hugh Sidney Knox, Northamptonshire Regiment
- Major James Meldrum Knox, Royal Warwickshire Regiment
- Temp Major Robert Sinclair Knox, Royal Inniskilling Fusiliers
- Captain Robert Horace Koster, South Lancashire Regiment
- Major Bruce Launcelot Lake, Royal Army Veterinary Corps
- Major Roger Montague Radcliffe Lamb, Northumberland Fusiliers
- Major Walter John Lambert, Indian Army, attd. Liverpool Regiment
- Major John Frederick Paltock Langdon
- Lieutenant-Colonel James William Langstaff, Royal Army Medical Corps
- Major Frank Cordon Larmour, Army Ordnance Depot
- Major Ronald Hastings Lascelles, Royal Artillery
- Major Walter Henry Patrick Law, Army Service Corps
- Major Thomas Bernard Arthur Leahy, Army Ordnance Depot
- Major Augustine Leaning, Royal Army Veterinary Corps
- Temp Captain William Rimington Ledgard, Royal Marines Artillery
- Captain and Brevet Major Reginald Tilson Lee, Royal West Surrey Regiment
- Temp Major Neville Leese, Army Service Corps
- Major Reginald Francis Legge, Leinster Regiment
- Lieutenant-Colonel William Kaye Legge, Essex Regiment
- Captain Robert Anthony Cleghorn Linington Leggett, Worcestershire Regiment
- Captain Charles Herbert Lemmon, Royal Field Artillery
- Major Hubert Maxwell Lenox-Conyngham, FRCVS, Royal Army Veterinary Corps
- Lieutenant-Colonel Philip Leveson-Gower, Nottinghamshire & Derbyshire Regiment
- Major Claude Francis Liardet, Royal Garrison Artillery
- Temp Major Charles Edward Ligertwood, MD, Royal Army Medical Corps
- Major James Howard Lindsay, London Regiment
- Captain Michael Egan Lindsay, Dragoon Guards
- Captain Alfred Lord Lintott, London Regiment
- Major Cecil Hunter Little, Somerset Light Infantry, attached Egyptian Army
- Major Horace Lloyd, Northamptonshire Regiment
- Major Robert Norman Lockhart, Royal Artillery
- Lieutenant-Colonel Francis Douglas Logan, Royal Artillery
- Major Charles Moorsom Longmore, Royal Field Artillery
- Temp Major Lionel Fortescue King, Earl of Lovelace, Northumberland Fusiliers
- Major Stuart Low, Royal Garrison Artillery
- Major Penton Shakespear Lowis, Royal Garrison Artillery
- Captain Sir Charles Bingham Lowther, Bt, Yeomanry
- Major and Brevet Lieutenant-Colonel Cuthbert Henry Tindall Lucas, Royal Berkshire Regiment
- Temp Major Cyril Montagu Luck, Royal Engineers
- Major Frederick William Lumsden, Royal Marines Artillery
- Major William Forbes Lumsden, Royal Garrison Artillery
- Major Noel Luxmoore, Devonshire Regiment
- Major Gordon Ponsonby MacClellan, Royal Garrison Artillery
- Lieutenant-Colonel Robert Chaine Alexander McCalmont, Irish Guards
- Rev. William Patrick Glyn McCormick, Royal Army Chaplains' Department
- Temp Lieutenant-Colonel Sir George McCrae, VD, Royal Scots
- Major William Hew McCowan, Cameron Highlanders, employed Egyptian Army
- Captain Charles Leslie Macdonald, Unattd. List, attd. Manchester Regiment
- Major Edmond McDonnell, MB, Royal Army Medical Corps
- Major William Allan McDougall, FRCVS, Royal Army Veterinary Corps
- Major Charles Carlyle Macdowell, Royal Field Artillery
- Major Arthur Thomas McGrath, Royal Artillery
- Lieutenant-Colonel James Doull Mackay, Hampshire Regiment
- Captain Colin Mansfield Mackenzie, London Regiment
- Captain Donald Francis Mackenzie, MB, Royal Army Medical Corps
- Lieutenant Eric Dighton Mackenzie, Scots Guards
- Major John Hugh Mackenzie, Royal Scots
- Major William Scobie MacKenzie, Army Ordnance Depot
- Lieutenant-Colonel Frederick William Mackenzie, Royal Field Artillery
- Major John Pierse Mackesy, Royal Engineers
- Major James Mackinnon, Royal Army Medical Corps
- Major Ernest Elliot Buckland Mackintosh, Royal Engineers
- Temp Major Stanley Hugh Macintosh, Northumberland Fusiliers
- Captain Donald Kenneth McLeod, Indian Army
- Temp Major Francis Raymond McMahon, Royal Engineers
- Temp Captain Harold Alfred MacMichael, Sudan Civil Service, attached Egyptian Army
- Captain William Foster MacNeece, Royal West Kent Regiment and Royal Flying Corps
- Temp Major Graham McNicoll, Durham Light Infantry
- Captain Henry St. George Murray Mcrae, Indian Army
- Temp Major Francis Samuel Needham Macrory, Royal Inniskilling Fusiliers
- Major Charles Edwin McVittie, Army Service Corps
- Captain Valerio Awly Magawly Cerati de Calry, Dragoons
- Major Arthur Kerr Main, Royal Artillery
- Lieutenant-Colonel Cecil Wilmot Mainprise, Royal Army Medical Corps
- Major Mark Edward Makgill-Crighton-Maitland, Grenadier Guards
- Major Charles Herbert Mallock, Royal Field Artillery
- Captain Paul Copeland Maltby, Royal Welsh Fusiliers, and Royal Flying Corps
- Major Wilfred Osborne Marks, Army Service Corps
- Major Ronald Marryat, Royal Field Artillery
- Major and Brevet Colonel Francis James Marshall, Seaforth Highlanders
- Temp Captain John Dodds Marshall, MB, Royal Army Medical Corps
- Major Horace de Courcy Martelli, Royal Artillery
- Lieutenant-Colonel Edward Charles Massy, Royal Field Artillery
- Major Edmund Byam Mathew-Lannowe, Royal West Surrey Regiment
- Lieutenant-Colonel John Smart Matthew, Army Service Corps
- Temp Major Harry Maud, General List
- Captain Alan Hamer Maude, Army Service Corps
- Major John St. Aubyn Maughan, Royal Army Medical Corps
- Captain Geoffrey Archibald Prentice Maxwell, MVO MC, Royal Engineers
- Major Mervyn Meares, Army Ordnance Depot
- Lieutenant-Colonel Ernest Lennox Mears, Army Service Corps
- Major Trevor Irvine-Nevitt Mears, Army Service Corps
- Captain James Ross Conrad Meiklejohn, Border Regiment
- Captain Alexander Henry Menzies, Highland Light Infantry
- Major Christopher Henry Frank Metcalfe, Bedfordshire Regiment
- Lieutenant-Colonel Fenwick Henry Metcalfe, Royal Garrison Artillery
- Captain Francis Hugo Lindley Meynell, Royal Field Artillery
- Major Cecil Roy Millar, Royal Army Medical Corps
- Temp Captain Joseph Sidney Miller, Machine Gun Corps
- Temp Captain Robert Molyneux Miller, Royal Army Medical Corps
- Major John Milligan, Royal Field Artillery
- Captain Arthur Mordaunt Mills, Indian Army
- Major Octavius Rodney Everard Milman, Royal Garrison Artillery
- Major Herbert Milward Milward, Nottinghamshire & Derbyshire Regiment
- Brevet Lieutenant-Colonel John Randle Minshull Minshull-Ford, MC, Royal Welsh Fusiliers
- Captain Charles Johnstone Mitchell, Oxfordshire & Buckinghamshire Light Infantry
- Temp Major James Thomson Rankin Mitchell, Royal Scots
- Temp Lieutenant-Colonel Edgar Roberts Mobbs, Northamptonshire Regiment
- Major Herbert Ellicombe Molesworth, Royal Garrison Artillery
- Major and Brevet Lieutenant-Colonel Francis Stewart Montague-Bates, East Surrey Regiment
- Major Hugh Ferguson Montgomery, Royal Marine Light Infantry
- Captain Lancelot Geoffrey Moore, King's Royal Rifle Corps
- Major Hubert Horatio Shirley Morant, Durham Light Infantry
- Lieutenant-Colonel Edward Maudsley Morphew, Royal Army Medical Corps
- Captain Henry Treise Morshead, Royal Engineers
- Lieutenant-Colonel Frederick Blundell Moss-Blundell, Royal Field Artillery
- Major Joseph Ernest Munby, King's Own Yorkshire Light Infantry
- Captain Cyril Francis de Sales Murphy, MC, Royal Berkshire Regiment, and Royal Flying Corps
- Captain Kenelm Digby Bold Murray, Indian Army
- Major Leslie Murray, Royal Warwickshire Regiment
- Major Henry Lloyd Murrow, Royal Garrison Artillery
- Captain Edward Osborn Armstrong Newcombe, Reserve of Officers
- Major William Ashley Nicholls, Royal Field Artillery
- Captain Alexander George Nicol Smith, Army Service Corps
- Lieutenant-Colonel William Wylie Norman, Manchester Regiment
- Major Samuel Edward Norris, Liverpool Regiment
- Lieutenant Thomas Walker Nott, Gloucestershire Regiment
- Major Edward Bunbury North, Royal Fusiliers
- Lieutenant-Colonel Herbert John Nutt, Royal Warwickshire Regiment
- Rev. Maurice O'Connell, Royal Army Chaplains' Department
- Major Arthur Radulphus Oldfield, Army Ordnance Depot
- Captain George Milner Ormerod, Royal Field Artillery
- Rev. Benjamin Garniss O'Rorke, MA, Royal Army Chaplains' Department
- Major Darrell Ovey, Rifle Brigade
- Major Edmund Christopher Packe, Royal Fusiliers
- Major Lewis Meadows Shaw Page, Army Service Corps
- Major Santiago Luis-Pallant, Royal Army Medical Corps
- Major Samuel Farrer Godfrey Pallin, FRCVS, Royal Army Veterinary Corps
- Major William Parker, London Regiment
- Temp Captain William Newton Parker, MD, Royal Army Medical Corps
- Lieutenant-Colonel Claud Frederick Pillington Parry, Royal Field Artillery
- Captain Cecil Parsons, Royal West Surrey Regiment
- Lieutenant-Colonel Durie Parsons, Army Service Corps
- Major Arthur William Sibbald Paterson, Somerset Light Infantry, attached Royal Irish Fusiliers
- Major William Pattinson Paynter, Royal Artillery
- Major Sidney Arthur Pearse, Indian Army, attended East Lancashire Regiment
- Major Sydney Capel Peck, Royal Artillery
- Captain Ryland Talbot Pemberton, Army Service Corps
- Temp Major Hubert Stanley-Whitmore Pennington, Army Service Corps
- Major Arthur Francis Gore Pery-Knox-Gore, Army Service Corps
- Captain Thomas Henry Peyton, Royal Army Medical Corps
- Major Brian Surtees Phillpotts, Royal Engineers
- Captain Emil William Pickering, Royal Field Artillery
- Captain Francis Alexander Umfreville Pickering, Dragoons
- Major Francis Stewart Gilderoy Piggott, Royal Engineers
- Captain William Spilman Pilcher, Grenadier Guards
- Captain Guy Reginald Pilkington, South Lancashire Regiment
- Lieutenant-Colonel Edmund Walker Penny Pinkney, Army Service Corps
- Lieutenant-Colonel The Honourable Stuart Pleydell-Bouverie, Royal Field Artillery
- Captain John George Latham Pleydell-Nott, Army Service Corps
- Captain Kelburne Archibald Plimpton, East Yorkshire Regiment
- Lieutenant-Colonel Charles Edward Pollock, Royal Army Medical Corps
- Temp Major George Paton Pollitt, Royal Engineers
- Major Edward Alexander Pope, South Wales Borderers
- Captain Francis Pope, Northamptonshire Regiment
- Major and Brevet Lieutenant-Colonel Hubert Cecil Potter, Liverpool Regiment
- Major William Allen Potter, Army Service Corps
- Major Robert Montagu Powell, Royal Artillery
- Lieutenant William Henry Powell, Royal Field Artillery
- Major Hugh Stainton Poyntz, Bedfordshire Regiment
- Temp Captain Kenneth Elliston Poyser, Yorkshire Light Infantry
- Captain Thomas Wykeham Pragnell, Hussars
- Major Audley Charles Pratt, Royal Inniskilling Fusiliers
- Captain Robert Edward Burton Pratt, Royal Engineers
- Captain and Brevet Major Frank Preedy, MC, Royal Engineers
- Lieutenant-Colonel Alfred Frederick Prechtel, Royal Field Artillery
- Temp Lieutenant-Colonel Charies Frederick Pretor-Pinney, Rifle Brigade
- Major and Brevet Lieutenant-Colonel Thomas Herbert Francis Price, Duke of Cornwall's Light Infantry
- Major Thomas Rose Caradoc Price, Welsh Guards
- Major and Brevet Lieutenant-Colonel Geoffrey Robert Pridham, Royal Engineers
- Major and Brevet Lieutenant-Colonel Hall Grant Pringle, Royal Field Artillery
- Major Clive Gordon Pritchard, Royal Garrison Artillery
- Lieutenant-Colonel Charles William Profeit, MB, Army Medical Service
- Lieutenant-Colonel Harold Vernon Prynne, FRCS, Royal Army Medical Corps
- Temp Major Bruce Hale Puckle, Machine Gun Corps
- Captain William Brooke Purdon, MC MB, Royal Army Medical Corps
- Major Lydmar Moline Purser, MB, Royal Army Medical Corps
- Captain Kellow William Pye, Royal Engineers
- Temp Major Douglas Quirk, York & Lancaster Regiment
- Captain Archibald Gordon Rainsford-Hannay, Royal Engineers, employed Egyptian Army
- Major Frederick Rainsford-Hannay, Royal Field Artillery
- Major Algernon Forbes Randolph, Suffolk Regiment
- Lieutenant-Colonel Wilson Ranson, FRCS, Royal Army Medical Corps
- Major Matthew Burrow Ray, Royal Army Medical Corps
- Captain John James Read, Royal Field Artillery
- Major Robert James Rees-Mogg, Royal Irish Regiment, employed Egyptian Army
- Lieutenant-Colonel William John Kerr Rettie, Royal Field Artillery
- Captain Godfrey Dean Rhodes, Royal Engineers
- Major Henry George Ricardo, Royal Field Artillery (retired)
- Major Harold Arthur David Richards, Army Service Corps
- Lieutenant-Colonel Percy Edward Ricketts, MVO, Indian Army
- Major Arthur Wilmot Rickman, Northumberland Fusiliers
- Major John Herbert Ridgway, North Staffordshire Regiment
- Captain Crescent Gebhard Risley, Indian Army
- Major Theodore Francis Ritchie, MB, Royal Army Medical Corps
- Major Arthur Henry Roberts, Army Service Corps
- Major Charles Chetwode Robertson, Royal Field Artillery
- Major Norman Bethune Robertson, Royal Field Artillery
- Major William Robertson, Royal Engineers
- Major Archibald Tyrrell Robinson, East Surrey Regiment, attached Oxfordshire & Buckinghamshire Light Infantry
- Temp Lieutenant-Colonel Beverly Beverly Robinson, Yorkshire Light Infantry
- Honorary Major and Honorary Lieutenant-Colonel Edward Heaton Robinson, Army Ordnance Depot
- Major Frederick Winwood Robinson, Royal Field Artillery
- Major Leonard John Whishaw Robinson, Royal Field Artillery
- Major and Brevet Lieutenant-Colonel Stratford Watson Robinson, Royal Artillery
- Major William Pasley Robinson, Army Service Corps
- Lieutenant-Colonel Horace Samson Roch, Royal Army Medical Corps
- Major Henry Schofield Rogers, Royal Engineers
- Captain Hugh Henry Rogers, Royal Artillery (retired)
- Temp Lieutenant-Colonel George Rollo, Liverpool Regiment
- Captain Stanley Percy Ashby Rolls, MC, Dorsetshire Regiment
- Major Cresswell Paillet Rooke, Middlesex Regiment
- Major Alexander Macgregor Rose, MB, Royal Army Medical Corps
- Temp Lieutenant-Colonel Hugh Arthur Rose, Royal Scots
- Major Hugh Alexander Leslie Rose, Royal Artillery
- Major Walter Mytton Royston-Pigott, Army Service Corps
- Lieutenant-Colonel Henry John Russell, Army Service Corps
- Captain James Cosmo Russell, Indian Army
- Major William Chambers Pomeroy Russell, Royal Garrison Artillery
- Major William Kelson Russell, Royal Engineers
- Captain George James Paul St. Clair, Royal Artillery
- Major Edmund Farquhar St. John, Royal Artillery
- Lieutenant-Colonel Frederick Dudley Samuel, London Regiment
- Temp Major Frederick Alfaro Samuel, Royal Welsh Fusiliers
- Major Vincent Corbett Sandilands, Scottish Rifles
- Captain Arthur Edward Every Sargent, MC, Indian Army
- Lieutenant Percy William George Sargent, MB FRCS, Army Medical Service
- Captain Harold Cecil Rich Saunders, East Yorkshire Regiment
- Major Gerald Tahourdin Savage, Army Service Corps
- Major Lawrence Wrey Savile, Royal Artillery
- Temp Major Arnold Kenneth Malcolm Cecil Wordsworth Savory, East Yorkshire Regiment
- Major George Adinston McLaren Sceales, Argyll & Sutherland Highlanders
- Major Charles Alexander Reid Scott, Royal Artillery
- Temp Captain Ernest Scott, MB, Royal Army Medical Corps
- Major John Willoughby Scott, Yeomanry
- Temp Major Robert Hamilton Scott, Royal Inniskilling Fusiliers
- Lieutenant-Colonel Tom Ogle Seagram, Royal Field Artillery
- Major Douglas Thorne Seckham, South Staffordshire Regiment
- Lieutenant-Corporal Herbert Spencer Seligman, Royal Artillery
- Major Archibald George Seymour, Dragoons
- Captain Edward Seymour, MVO, Grenadier Guards
- Lieutenant-Colonel Daniel David Shanahan, Royal Army Medical Corps
- Major Gordon Donald Archibald Shaw, Royal Field Artillery
- Major Basil Heron Shaw-Stewart, Royal Artillery
- Captain Robert Shelton, Army Service Corps
- Lieutenant-Colonel James Donnelly Sherer, Royal Garrison Artillery
- Lieutenant-Colonel John Payzant Silver, MB, Royal Army Medical Corps
- Temp Major Charles Thomas Simcox, Duke of Cornwall's Light Infantry
- Temp Major Percy Reginald Owen Abel Sinmer, West Riding Regiment
- Captain John de Luze Simonds, Royal Garrison Artillery
- Lieutenant-Colonel Percy Cyriac Burrell Skinner, Northamptonshire Regiment
- Temp Lieutenant-Colonel Edgar Smalley, Manchester Regiment
- Lieutenant-Colonel George Edward Smith, CMG, Royal Engineers
- Rev. Canon Martin Linton Smith, DD, Royal Army Chaplains' Department
- Major Sidney Smith, Royal Field Artillery and Royal Flying Corps
- Major George Nowell Thomas Smyth-Osbourne, Devonshire Regiment
- Captain Denis Mavisyn Anslow Sole, Border Regiment
- Major Trevor Lloyd Blunden Soutry, Royal Irish Rifles
- Lieutenant-Colonel Gilbert Ormerod Spence, Durham Light Infantry
- Major Charlton Watson Spinks, Royal Artillery, employed Egyptian Army
- Staff Surgeon Charles Edward Cortis Stanford, MB RN, Royal Naval Division
- Captain and Brevet Major The Honourable Frederick William Stanley, Royal Artillery, Hussars
- Major Nigel Austin Stebbing, Royal Field Artillery
- Major Arthur William Stericker, Duke of Cornwall's Light Infantry
- Major Arthur Cornish Jeremie Stevens, Royal Engineers
- Major Cecil Mordant Henry Stevens, Royal Artillery
- Major Harold Raphael Gaetano Stevens, Royal Garrison Artillery
- Major Leighton Marlow Stevens, Worcestershire Regiment
- Captain Percival Henry Stevenson, King's Own Scottish Borderers
- Major Douglas Stewart, Royal Field Artillery
- Major William Stirling, Royal Field Artillery
- Major Ernest Norman Stockley, Royal Engineers
- Temp Major Harris Lawrence Stocks, Royal Scots
- Lieutenant-Colonel Thomas Richard Stokoe, Duke of Cornwall's Light Infantry
- Captain and Brevet Major Percy Vere Powys Stone, Norfolk Regiment
- Temp Major Philip Francis Story, Royal Engineers
- Major The Honourable Edward Plantagenet Joseph Corbally Stourton, Yorkshire Light Infantry
- Major Cyril Edwin Stranack, Royal Artillery
- Captain Frederick John Martin Stratton, Royal Engineers
- Captain Guy Clifford Stubbs, Suffolk Regiment
- Major John Orlando Summerhayes, Royal Army Medical Corps
- Temp Major Frank Summers, DSC, Machine Gun Corps
- Major and Brevet Lieutenant-Colonel William Frederick Sweny, Royal Fusiliers
- Major Donald Cuthbertson Sword, Scottish Rifles
- Major Mark Synge, Supply and Transport Corps, Indian Army
- Captain Thomas George Taylor, Gordon Highlanders
- Major Alfred Temperley, Northumberland Fusiliers
- Major and Brevet Lieutenant-Colonel Roger Stephen Tempest, Scots Guards
- Major William Percival Cosnahan Tenison, Royal Artillery
- Captain Frank Stanford Thackeray, MC, Highland Light Infantry
- Lieutenant-Colonel Albert George Thompson, MB, Royal Army Medical Corps
- Major and Brevet Lieutenant-Colonel Richard Lovell Brereton Thompson, Royal Engineers
- Captain Stephen John Thompson, Royal Field Artillery
- Major Charles Glendenning Thomson, Royal Army Medical Corps
- Major Austin Thorp, Royal Garrison Artillery
- Major Harold Thorpe, Yeomanry
- Major and Brevet Colonel Edward Ivan de Sausmarez Thorpe, Bedfordshire Regiment
- Major Lionel Victor Thurston, Royal Army Medical Corps
- Major Guy Thwaites, Army Service Corps, employed Egyptian Army
- Major Lord Alexander George Thynne, Yeomanry
- Lieutenant-Colonel Norman Eccles Tilney, Royal Artillery
- Major Francis Martin Tomkinson, Worcestershire Regiment
- Major James Newman Townsend, Royal Warwickshire Regiment
- Major William Henry Traill, East Lancashire Regiment
- Temp Major Reginald Graham Trower, MC, Royal Engineers
- Major Charles Montagu Truman, Lancers
- Captain Frederick Joseph Trump, Monmouthshire Regiment
- Major George Francis Stratford Tuke, Royal Artillery
- Major and Brevet Lieutenant-Colonel Ernest Vere Turner, Royal Engineers
- Major John Earner Turner, Scottish Rifles
- Major John Lannoy Forbes Tweedie, Gloucestershire Regiment, attached Lancashire Fusiliers
- Major William Cecil Erasmus Twidale, Royal Artillery
- Captain and Brevet Major Edward Kemble Twiss, Indian Army
- Major Francis Arthur Twiss, MVO, Royal Artillery
- Major and Brevet Lieutenant-Colonel Archibald George Brabazon Urmston
- Captain Archibald Tito le Marchant Utterson, Leicestershire Regiment
- Major Freegift William Van der Kiste, Royal Garrison Artillery
- Major Thomas Boyle Vandeleur, Royal Irish Regiment
- Temp Major Paul Cairn Vellacott, South Lancashire Regiment
- Temp Lieutenant-Colonel Arthur Neville Vince, Liverpool Regiment
- Lieutenant-Colonel Henry Oswald Wade, West Yorkshire Regiment
- Lieutenant-Colonel Thomas Stewart Herschal Wade, Lancashire Fusiliers
- Major Thomas Montague Wakefield, Royal Artillery
- Major John Crosby Walch, Royal Field Artillery
- Major Henry West Walker, Royal Artillery
- Captain William Herbert Walker, Royal Army Veterinary Corps
- Lieutenant-Colonel Frederick William Henry Walshe, Royal Artillery
- Major Charles Lawrence Tyndall Walwyn, MC, Royal Artillery
- Major William Melvill Warburton, Royal Field Artillery
- Major Hugh Fawcett Warden, Royal West Surrey Regiment
- Major John Waring, Royal Artillery
- Major Robert Baker Warton, Royal Artillery
- Major Hugh Branston Warwick, Army Ordnance Depot
- Lieutenant-Colonel Francis Wyatt Watling, Royal Engineers
- Lieutenant-Colonel Andrew Alexander Watson, Royal Army Medical Corps
- Lieutenant-Colonel Brian Watts, Royal Army Medical Corps
- Lieutenant-Colonel Benjamin Irby Way, North Staffordshire Regiment
- Captain and Brevet Major George Ambrose Congreve Webb, Reserve of Officers
- Major Kenneth Charles Weldon, Royal Dublin Fusiliers
- Major Harry Harris Were, Reserve of Officers
- Major Alexander Henry Delap West, Royal Artillery
- Major Francis George West, Royal Artillery
- Major John Leslie Weston, Army Service Corps
- Major Herbert Laurence Wethered, Army Ordnance Depot
- Majot Cyril Moreton Wheatley, General List
- Major Robert Henry Whitcombe, Army Service Corps
- Temp Major Arthur Charles White, Yorkshire Light Infantry
- Major George Frederick Charles White, Royal Artillery
- Captain Oliver Woodhouse White, Dorsetshire Regiment
- Lieutenant-Colonel Wilfred James Whitehead, London Regiment
- Lieutenant-Colonel Francis Henry Douglas Charlton Whitmore, Yeomanry
- Major and Brevet Lieutenant-Colonel Edgar Askin Wiggin
- Major and Brevet Lieutenant-Colonel Kenneth Wigram, Indian Army
- Captain Charles Joseph Wiley, Royal Irish Rifles
- Major Edmund Ernest Wilford, Indian Army
- Captain Charles Leyburn Wilkinson, Royal Field Artillery
- Major Henry Benfield Des Voeux Wilkinson, Durham Light Infantry
- Captain George Thomas Wilian, Home Counties Field Ambulance, Royal Army Medical Corps
- Captain John Condliff Modesley Williams, Royal Field Artillery
- Major and Brevet Lieutenant-Colonel Arthur Harry Hutton Wilson, Wiltshire Regiment
- Major Alexander Moreton Wilson, Army Service Corps
- Lieutenant-Colonel George Tyrie Brand Wilson, Argyll & Sutherland Highlanders, attached King's Own Scottish Borderers
- Major Henry Maitland Wilson, Rifle Brigade
- Temp Major William Herbert Wilson, Royal Field Artillery
- Major Maurice Guy Winder, Royal Army Medical Corps
- Major Basil Fenton Wingate, Royal Army Medical Corps
- Major Rev. William Edward Wingfield, Royal Field Artillery
- Temp Lieutenant-Colonel Edward Allan Wood, Shropshire Light Infantry
- Captain Hugo Kenneth Stuart Woodhouse, Liverpool Regiment
- Major Richard Nason Woodley, Royal Army Medical Corps
- Captain Max Woods, South Lancashire Regiment
- Temp Major Philip James Woods, 9th Battalion, Royal Irish Rifles
- Captain and Brevet Major Rivers Berney Worgan, Indian Army
- Major Geoffrey Raymond Worthington-Wilmer, Scottish Rifles, employed Egyptian Army
- Major Edward Martyn Woulfe Flanagan, East Surrey Regiment
- Captain William Gordon Wright, Royal Army Medical Corps
- Captain Ernest Robert Caldwell Wyatt, Indian Army
- Captain Richard Owen Wynne, Bedfordshire Regiment
- Major Ralph Maximilian Yorke, Yeomanry
- Major Herbert Nugent Young, Royal Inniskilling Fusiliers
- Lieutenant-Colonel Walter Herbert Young, Yorkshire Regiment
- Temp Captain William Allan Young, MB, Royal Army Medical Corps
- Major George Udny Yule, Royal Engineers
- Major William Dent Bewsher, Reserve of Officers
- Captain Frederick Cromie De Butts, MC, Indian Army
- Major Charles Victor Isacks, Army Pay Department
- Captain Herbert John Mackenzie, Indian Army
- Temp. Captain Peter Norman Nissen, Royal Engineers
- 2nd Lieutenant John Sanderson Poole, King's Royal Rifle Corps
- Lieutenant-Colonel Richard Elmslie Ramsden, Royal Field Artillery
- Captain Alexander Whitmore Colquhoun Richardson, Bedfordshire Regiment
- Major Percy Gotch Robinson, Royal Artillery
- Major Henry Storr, Reserve of Officers
- Major Henry Innes-Storey, Devonshire Regiment
- Captain William Wyndham Torre Torr, MC, West Yorkshire Regiment
- Major Stuart Harman Joseph Thunder, MC, Northamptonshire Regiment
- Captain Arthur Lucius Wilford, Indian Army
- Major and Brevet Lieutenant-Colonel Herbert Edward Winsloe, Royal Engineers
- Captain Ronald Henry Warton Worsley, King's Own Scottish Borderers, attached Egyptian Army

Australian Imperial Force

- Lieutenant-Colonel Stuart Milligan Anderson, Australian Field Artillery
- Lieutenant-Colonel Frederick William Gadsby Annand, Australian Pioneer Battalion
- Lieutenant-Colonel George Walter Barber, Australian Army Medical Corps
- Major Thomas Albert Blamey, Commonwealth Military Forces
- Major Stephen Bruggy, Commonwealth Military Forces
- Lieutenant-Colonel James William Clark
- Lieutenant-Colonel Harold Edward Cohen, Australian Field Artillery
- Lieutenant-Colonel Herbert Brayley Collett
- Lieutenant-Colonel Graham Coulter
- Lieutenant-Colonel Walter Adams Coxen, Australian Field Artillery
- Lieutenant-Colonel Herbert James Cox-Taylor, Australian Field Artillery
- Major Clarence Wells Didier Daly
- Major Francis Plumley Derham, Field Artillery Brigade, Australian Field Artillery
- Major Joseph Espie Dods, MC, Australian Army Medical Corps
- Lieutenant-Colonel James Murdoch Archer Durrant
- Captain Andrew James Dwyer
- Major Richard John Dyer, Australian Engineers
- Lieutenant-Colonel Charles Hazell Elliott
- Major Daniel Edward Evans, Australian Engineers
- Lieutenant-Colonel George Andrew Ferguson
- Lieutenant-Colonel Wilfrid Kent Fethers
- Lieutenant-Colonel Albert Cecil Fewtrell
- Lieutenant-Colonel Frederick William Dempster Forbes
- Major Henry Kenneth Fry, Australian Army Medical Corps
- Lieutenant-Colonel Colin Dunmore Fuller, Australian Light Horse Regiment
- Major Grosvenor George Stuart Gordon, Australian Engineers
- Lieutenant-Colonel William Grant, Australian Light Horse Regiment
- Major Frank Harbottle, Australian Field Artillery
- Lieutenant-Colonel Charles Henry William Hardy, VD, Australian Army Medical Corps
- Captain Douglas Rawson Harris, Australian Field Artillery
- Major Frank le Leu Henley, Australian Army Service Corps
- Lieutenant-Colonel Sydney Charles Edgar Herring
- Lieutenant-Colonel Owen Glendower Howell-Price, MC
- Lieutenant-Colonel Francis Augustus Hughes, Australian Field Artillery
- Lieutenant-Colonel Carl Herman Jess
- Major Arthur Harold Keith Jopp, Australian Field Artillery
- Lieutenant-Colonel Herbert Thomas Christopher Layh
- Captain Cyril McEachern Lillie
- Major Daniel Aston Luxton, Australian Infantry
- Lieutenant-Colonel David McFie McConaghy, CMG
- Major George St. John Fancourt McDonald, Australian Field Artillery
- Lieutenant-Colonel Iven Giffard Mackay
- Lieutenant-Colonel William Kenneth Seaforth Mackenzie
- Captain George Charles Magenis
- Lieutenant-Colonel Charles Henry Ernest Manning, Australian Army Service Corps
- Major Alexander Hammett Marks, Australian Army Medical Corps
- Lieutenant-Colonel Edward Fowell Martin
- Lieutenant-Colonel John Baldwin Meredith, Australian Light Horse Regiment
- Major Charles Gordon Norman Miles, Australian Divisional Artillery
- Rev. Frederic James Miles, Australian Army Chaplains' Department
- Major Stanley Lynall Milligan
- Major Edmund James Houghton Nicholson, Australian Pioneer Battalion
- Major Hector Alexander Nugent, Australian Army Service Corps
- Lieutenant-Colonel George Macleay Macarthur Onslow, Australian Light Horse Regiment
- Lieutenant-Colonel Owen Forbes Phillips, Australian Field Artillery
- Lieutenant-Colonel John Hare Phipps, Australian Army Medical Corps
- Major Eric Clive Pegus Plant
- Major Ernest George Radford, Australian Machine Gun Corps
- Lieutenant-Colonel Alexander Windeyer Ralston
- Major John Cecil Thomas Edmund Charles Ridley, Australian Light Horse Regiment
- Lieutenant-Colonel Stephen Richard Roberts, Australian Infantry
- Major David Thompson Rogers, Australian Field Artillery
- Lieutenant-Colonel Thomas Gordon Ross, Australian Army Medical Corps
- Major William Howard St. Clair, Australian Field Artillery
- Lieutenant-Colonel Charles Gordon Shaw, Australian Army Medical Corps
- Lieutenant-Colonel Robert Smith
- Lieutenant-Colonel George Cattell Somerville, Staff
- Major Alexander Steele, Australian Machine Gun Company
- Lieutenant-Colonel James Campbell Stewart
- Major Vernon Asleton Hobart Sturdee, Australian Engineers
- Lieutenant-Colonel Herbert James Cox Taylor, Australian Field Artillery
- Lieutenant-Colonel Frederick William Toll
- Major Theodore Friederick Ulrich
- Major Horace George Viney, Light Horse Regiment
- Lieutenant-Colonel James Walker
- Lieutenant-Colonel Stanley Price Weir
- Lieutenant-Colonel John Basil St. Vincent Welch, Australian Army Medical Corps
- Captain Leslie Charles Whitfeld, Australian Army Veterinary Corps
- Major William McKenzie Young

Canadian Forces

- Major Ronald Okeden Alexander, Canadian Infantry
- Major Merrill Vincent Allen, Canadian Mounted Rifles
- Major and Brevet Lieutenant-Colonel William Beaumont Anderson, Canadian Engineers
- Major William Andrewes, Canadian Infantry
- Lieutenant-Colonel Ralph Craven Andros, Canadian Mounted Rifles Battalion
- Major Frank Farquier Arnoldi, Canadian Field Artillery
- Major Walter Mackie Balfour, Canadian Mounted Rifles Battalion
- Major John Clement Ball, Canadian Field Artillery
- Major William Gilbert Beeman, Canadian Artillery
- Lieutenant-Colonel Arthur Henry Bell, Canadian Infantry
- Lieutenant-Colonel Charles Edward Bent, Canadian Infantry
- Major William Robert Bertram, Canadian Infantry
- Major Henry Eversley Boak, Royal Canadian Horse Artillery
- Lieutenant-Colonel Russell Hubert Britton, Canadian Field Artillery
- Captain Lawrence Newsam Beverley Bullock, Canadian Engineers
- Lieutenant-Colonel George Stephen Cantlie, Canadian Infantry
- Lieutenant-Colonel Henry Gurney Carscallen, Canadian Field Artillery
- Major Charles Francis Constantine, Royal Canadian Horse Artillery
- Temp Major Charles Arthur Corrigan, Canadian Army Service Corps
- Lieutenant-Colonel John Jennings Creelman, Canadian Field Artillery
- Major Ludger Jules Oliver Daly-Gingras, Canadian Infantry
- Temp. Major Angus Ward Davis, Canadian Engineers
- Major Arthur Édouard Dubuc, Canadian Infantry
- Lieutenant-Colonel William Henri de la Tour d'Auvergne Findlay, Canadian Army Service Corps
- Major Karl Creighton Folger, Canadian Ordnance Company
- Major James Wallace Forbes, Canadian Infantry
- Lieutenant-Colonel Frederick Arthur de Long Gascoigne, Canadian Infantry
- Lieutenant-Colonel Harry Augustus Genet, Canadian Infantry
- Temp Lieutenant-Colonel William Waring Primrose Gibsone, Canadian Divisional Headquarters
- Lieutenant-Colonel Harry Duncan Lockhart Gordon, Canadian Mounted Infantry
- Lieutenant-Colonel John Alexander Gunn, Canadian Infantry
- Major Hugh Walter Harbord, Canadian Mounted Rifles
- Major Frederick Owen Hodgins, Canadian Engineers
- Lieutenant-Colonel Thomas Fraser Homer-Dixon, Lord Strathcona's Horse
- Lieutenant-Colonel William St. Pierre Hughes, Canadian Infantry
- Major Bernard Maynard Humble, Canadian Infantry
- Lieutenant-Colonel Elmer Watson Jones, Canadian Infantry
- Major Terence Percival Jones, Canadian Infantry
- Major Walter Frederick Kemp, Canadian Infantry
- Lieutenant-Colonel James Kirkcaldy, Canadian Infantry
- Lieutenant-Colonel George Eric McCraig, Canadian Infantry
- Major Eric Whidden MacDonald, Canadian Infantry
- Major James Alexander Macdonell, Canadian Infantry
- Major Alan Brettell McEwen, Canadian Divisional Artillery
- Lieutenant-Colonel Archibald Ernest Graham McKenzie, Canadian Infantry
- Major John Percival MacKenzie, Canadian Infantry
- Major John Angus McDonald, Canadian Field Artillery
- Major Bartlett McLennan, Canadian Infantry
- Captain William Edward Manhard, Canadian Engineers
- Lieutenant-Colonel Henry Linton Milligan, Canadian Infantry
- Major Gordon Fraser Morrison, Canadian Infantry
- Major Frank Stanley Morrison, Royal Canadian Dragoons
- Major Lionel Frank Page, Canadian Infantry
- Major Robert Henry Palmer, Canadian Infantry
- Major Johnson Lindsay Rowlett Parsons, Canadian Infantry
- Major Thomas Edward Powers, Canadian Divisional Signal Company
- Major Barry Wentworth Roscoe, Canadian Mounted Rifles
- Major John Munro Ross, Canadian Infantry
- Lieutenant-Colonel Lorne Ross, Canadian Infantry
- Lieutenant-Colonel John Arthur Shaw, Canadian Army Service Corps
- Temp Colonel Arthur Evans Snell, Canadian Army Medical Corps
- Lieutenant-Colonel John Smith Stewart, Canadian Field Artillery
- Lieutenant-Colonel Thomas-Louis Tremblay, Canadian Infantry
- Major Paul Frederick Villiers, Canadian Infantry
- Major Francis Bethel Ware, Canadian Infantry
- Lieutenant-Colonel William Webster, Canadian Army Medical Corps
- Lieutenant-Colonel Robert Percy Wright, Canadian Army Medical Corps

New Zealand Force

- Lieutenant-Colonel William Henry Cunningham
- Lieutenant-Colonel John Findlay, CB, Canterbury Mounted Rifles
- Major Francis Henry Lampen, New Zealand Staff Corps
- Lieutenant-Colonel Charles Ernest Randolph Mackesy, Auckland Mounted Rifles
- Major Clyde McGilp, New Zealand Field Artillery
- Major Alexander George McKenzie
- Lieutenant-Colonel William Meldrum, CMG, Wellington Mounted Rifles Regiment
- Lieutenant-Colonel Charles William Melvill, New Zealand Rifle Brigade
- Lieutenant-Colonel Donald Norman Watson Murray, New Zealand Medical Corps
- Major James Pow, New Zealand Rifle Brigade
- Captain Victor Rogers, New Zealand Field Artillery
- Major Conrad Gordon Saxby, New Zealand Pioneer Battalion
- Major Robert Barrington Smythe, New Zealand Signal Company
- Lieutenant-Colonel Alexander Edward Stewart, New Zealand Rifle Brigade
- Major John Studholme, Canterbury Mounted Rifles

South African Contingent

- Temp Major Walter Brydon, South African Heavy Artillery
- Major Norman Harrison, South African Engineers
- Major Donald McLeay Macleod, South African Infantry
- Temp Major Michael Stanislaus Power, South African Medical Corps

In recognition of bravery and devotion to duty during mine-sweeping operations —

- Commander Hugh Seymour, RN
- Lieutenant-Commander Leslie Drew Fisher, RN
- Lieutenant-Commander Daniel McDowell, RN

For valuable services rendered in connection with the War —

- Captain James Molesworth Blair, Gordon Highlanders
- Captain Malcolm Grahame Christie, MC, Royal Flying Corps
- Major George Arthur Harris, Unattached List
- Major John Fraser Neilson, Hussars
- Temp. Major Ivon Henry Price, Special List
- Captain Arthur Holmes Quibell, Nottinghamshire & Derbyshire Regiment
- Captain Frank Rayner, Nottinghamshire & Derbyshire Regiment
- Major Sir Thomas Anderson Salt, Bt, late Hussars
- Major Harold Fownes Somerville, Rifle Brigade

Citations: In recognition of their services —

- Commander Frederick Edward Ketelbey Strong, RN. For the successful manner in which he conducted HMS Dwarf's actions, with the armed yacht Herzogin Elisabeth, Joss Battery, and the armed vessel Nachtigal, on 9, 11 and 16 September 1914, respectively, as well as other important duties, which on several occasions brought him into contact with the enemy during the Cameroon's Campaign.
- Commander Francis Henry Grenfell, RN
- Commander Herbert Charles Valentine Beresford Cheetham, RD, Royal Naval Reserve. As Chief Transport Officer with the Cameroon's Expeditionary Force, Cdr. Cheetham performed exceptional service under a heavy fire during the attacks on Jabassi on 8 October 1914, and in the subsequent embarkation of troops and retirement down stream of the flotilla after dark. He commanded the advanced detachments of the Nyong flotilla on the Edea expedition, driving out a hostile party from Dehane, and thereby enabling the French troops to land without opposition.
- Lieutenant-Commander Arthur Alured Mellin, RN
- Lieutenant-Commander John de Burgh Jessop, RN. In recognition of the skill and determination which he showed in making a successful submarine attack on an enemy light cruiser on 19 October 1916.
- Lieutenant-Commander Henry George Gardiner Westmore, RD, Royal Naval Reserve
- Lieutenant-Commander John Percival, Royal Naval Reserve. Lieutenant-Commander Percival was acting director of Nigeria Marine at the commencement of hostilities in the Cameroons, and was largely responsible, for the efficient manner in which the Nigeria Marine vessels were fitted out for duty with the expedition. He also performed valuable service as King's Harbour Master at Duala from 28 September to 14 December 1914, when he was appointed Director of Nigeria Marine at Lagos, in which position he invariably assisted the Senior Naval officer in every way possible throughout the campaign.

In recognition of services in the Battle of Jutland —

- Fleet Surgeon Ernest Alfred Penfold, MB, RN. Was in the fore medical distributing station when a heavy shell burst just outside, killing and wounding many. He was knocked down, bruised and shaken, but personally assisted in the removal of the wounded and tended them with unremitting skill and devotion for 40 hours without rest. His example was invaluable in keeping up the morale of the wounded and of the medical party under very trying conditions, the shell having, destroyed instruments, dressings, etc.
- Commander John Coombe Hodgson, RN. Led Destroyer attack on enemy Battle Cruisers, but, becoming engaged with enemy Destroyers, was unable to get within range. On conclusion of gun attack, in which several hostile Destroyers were sunk and the enemy beaten off, he attacked enemy Battle Fleet and fired four torpedoes under very hot fire of enemy Battleships secondary armament. His Destroyer was struck and damaged by a shell.
- Lieutenant-Commander Evelyn Claude Ogilvie Thomson, RN. Senior Officer of a Division of Destroyers, and having defeated the enemy Destroyers, gallantly pressed home attack with torpedoes on enemy Battle Cruisers.
- Captain Harold Blount, Royal Marine Artillery. Performed excellent service as officer of Q Turret on 31 May, as well as in the action off Heligoland in August 1914, and at the Dogger Bank in January 1915.

In recognition of their gallantry and devotion to duty in the Field —

- Captain Aylmer Gustavus Clerk, MC, Hertfordshire Regiment. For conspicuous gallantry in action. He led his company in the attack with great courage and initiative. He organised the consolidation of the captured position under heavy fire. On another occasion he repelled an enemy counter-attack. He set a splendid example throughout the operations.
- Temp Lieutenant-Commander Bernard Henry Ellis, Royal Naval Volunteer Reserve. For conspicuous gallantry in action.
- Temp Captain Christopher Garrett Elkington, Gloucestershire Regiment. For conspicuous gallantry in action. With six men he attacked and silenced an enemy machine gun. Later, he displayed great courage and ability in organising the defence of the position. He was twice wounded, but remained at duty directing operations until he was again severely wounded.
- Captain Cecil Champagne Herbert-Stepney, King's Royal Rifle Corps, attached Nottinghamshire & Derbyshire Regiment. For conspicuous gallantry in action. He went forward under intense fire to ascertain that consolidation was proceeding satisfactorily. His preparations for the attack, and his action throughout the assembly, contributed very largely to the success of the operations.
- Major Thomas David Murray, Hampshire Regiment, attached Royal Highlanders, temporarily attached Cambridgeshire Regiment. For conspicuous gallantry in action. He showed great skill and resource in handling his battalion over a very extended front and over a very difficult country. He seized all his objective, took many prisoners, and eventually consolidated the position won.
- Temp Captain Dyfrig Huws Pennant, Royal Army Medical Corps, attached Headquarters, Royal Field Artillery. For conspicuous gallantry and devotion to duty. He dressed and remained with three wounded men under the most intense fire. He has at all times set a splendid example of courage and coolness, and has on many occasions done fine work.
- Temp Lieutenant Walter Sterndale-Bennett, Royal Naval Volunteer Reserve. For conspicuous gallantry in action. He assumed command of and handled his battalion with marked courage and ability. He personally collected a party and bombed the enemy out of part of their second line, where they might have held up the attack.

==== Awarded a Bar to the Distinguished Service Order (DSO*) ====
- Commander Noel Frank Laurence, DSO RN. In recognition of the skill and determination which he showed in making a successful submarine attack on an enemy Battle Squadron on 5 November 1916.
- Lieutenant William Henry Stanway, DSO, Royal Welsh Fusiliers, attached Cheshire Regiment. For conspicuous gallantry in action. He handled his battalion in the attack with great courage and ability. He captured the position, inflicted much loss on the enemy, and took a large number of prisoners.

=== Distinguished Service Cross (DSC) ===
- Flight Lieutenant Ernest William Norton, Royal Naval Air Service. In recognition of his skill and gallantry in destroying a German kite balloon on 20 October 1916, under severe anti-aircraft fire.
- Surgeon Hother McCormack Hanschell, Royal Navy. In recognition of his services with the Tanganyika Flotilla. The comparative immunity from sickness enjoyed by the members of the expedition was due to the unremitting care bestowed by Surgeon Hanschell on the health of the personnel and on the sanitary state of the camps and vessels.
- Lieutenant Arthur Darville Dudley, Royal Naval Volunteer Reserve. In recognition of his services with the Tanganyika Flotilla. He showed great coolness and skill in handling his ship in all circumstances.
- Sub-Lieutenant Guy Trevarton Sholl, Royal Naval Volunteer Reserve. In recognition of his services in charge of a squadron of Royal Naval Armoured Cars in Armenia and Persia. By his presence of mind he saved the cars when they were ambushed by the Turks at Marnik on 1 September 1916, and by his devotion to duty, courage and hard work he effected the capture of the village of Norschen on 9 September and secured the explosion of a Turkish magazine, with great loss to the enemy. His consistent cheerfulness and unselfishness were a material factor in the success of the work accomplished by the cars.
- Gunner (T) James Albert Graham, Royal Navy. In recognition of his services in a submarine, which carried out a successful attack on an enemy Battle Squadron on 5 November 1916.
- Captain John Couch, Master of the Transport Trevorian. In recognition of the great coolness, judgment and resource which he displayed under very trying circumstances during the evacuation of Constanța on 22 October 1916. The Trevorian was the last ship to leave the harbour, which was already being shelled, was exposed to shell fire for an hour after putting to sea, and successfully avoided a submarine attack during the voyage. During the whole of this time Captain Couch remained on the bridge.

In recognition of services in the Battle of Jutland

- Francis William Potter, Gunner, RN. For very important duties during the action, carried out with great coolness and accuracy.
- Thomas Bazley, Gunner (T), RN. Was of great assistance during action on night of 31 May-1 June. In charge of torpedo armament of ship, and fired at enemy's Battle Fleet during the night with effect.

In recognition of bravery and devotion to duty during mine-sweeping operations

- Lieutenant Peter Alexander Crawford Sturrock, RN
- Lieutenant Arthur Edgar Buckland, RN
- Temp Lieutenant James Collis Bird, RN
- Lieutenant William G. Wood, Royal Naval Reserve
- Lieutenant Geoffrey Unsworth, Royal Naval Reserve
- Lieutenant Rudolph Lancelot Wikner, Royal Naval Reserve
- Lieutenant William St. Clair Fleming, Royal Naval Reserve
- Lieutenant John Percival Tugwood, Royal Naval Reserve
- Acting Lieutenant William George Duggan, Royal Naval Reserve
- Skipper Frederick Alfred Sibley, Royal Naval Reserve
- Skipper Benjamin Robert Joyce, Royal Naval Reserve
- Skipper George Ferguson, Royal Naval Reserve
- Skipper Alexander McLeod, Royal Naval Reserve
- Skipper Alexander McKay, Royal Naval Reserve
- Skipper Donald McMillan, Royal Naval Reserve
- Skipper Samson Herbert Hayes, Royal Naval Reserve

=== Military Cross (MC) ===
- Lieutenant Ernest Henry Alton, Territorial Force and Officers Training Corps
- Temp. 2nd Lieutenant Alphonso Watson Henchy, Royal Dublin Fusiliers
- 2nd Lieutenant Harry Aspdin Hewitt, Nottinghamshire & Derbyshire Regiment
- Lieutenant Robert Charles Lyon Holme, Somerset Light Infantry and Royal Flying Corps
- Lieutenant Guy Hardy MacCaw, Hussars
- Captain Michael Cleeve Martyn, Nottinghamshire & Derbyshire Regiment
- Temp. Captain Henry Stewart Powell, Ceylon Rifle and Royal Flying Corps
- Captain Herbert Vernon Stanley, MB, Royal Army Medical Corps
- Temp. 2nd Lieutenant Charles Weir, Royal Irish Rifles
- Temp. 2nd Lieutenant Arthur Lewis Williams, attached Hussars
- Captain Reginald Stuart Abbott, Indian Army
- Battery Sergeant Major William Henry Abbott, Royal Field Artillery
- Temp Lieutenant Robert Lloyd Abell, Royal Field Artillery
- Temp Captain Lauchlan Henry Dyke Acland, Royal Engineers
- Temp 2nd Lieutenant Robert Parker Adam, Argyll & Sutherland Highlanders, attached Machine Gun Corps
- Lieutenant Arthur Joseph John Paul Agius, London Regiment
- Temp 2nd Lieutenant Charles Bernard Ainslie, Hussars, attached Machine Gun Squadron
- Temp Captain William Ainslie, MD FRVS, Royal Army Medical Corps
- 2nd Lieutenant James Aitken, Royal Engineers
- Temp Captain Sidney James Alexander, Royal Field Artillery
- Quartermaster and Honorary Lieutenant John Allan, Seaforth Highlanders
- Quartermaster and Honorary Captain James Henry Alldridge, Rifle Brigade
- Temp Captain John Stanley Allen, Northumberland Fusiliers
- Captain Robert Hall Allen, Royal Artillery
- Temp Lieutenant Samuel Allen, Royal Irish Rifles
- Captain Harry Surtees Altham, King's Royal Rifle Corps
- Temp Captain George Douglas Amery, Hampshire Regiment
- Temp Lieutenant Charles Anderson, Royal Scots
- Temp Captain Eric John Anderson, Oxfordshire & Buckinghamshire Light Infantry
- Captain Martin Alan Anderson, Royal Engineers
- Lieutenant Frederick Dudley Andrews, Gloucestershire Regiment
- Temp Lieutenant William Paul Andrews, Royal Engineers
- 2nd Lieutenant John Ajigell, South Lancashire Regiment, attached Machine Gun Corps
- Temp Lieutenant Harry Allan Angier, Suffolk Regiment
- Lieutenant Edmund Graham Angus, Royal Field Artillery
- Temp Captain George Wilfred Anson, North Lancashire Regiment
- 2nd Lieutenant Geoffrey Arthur Anstee, Bedfordshire Regiment
- Captain Ralph Christopher Apletre, Royal Garrison Artillery
- 2nd Lieutenant John Ernest Appleyard, Royal Engineers
- Lieutenant Sidney Charles Manley Archibald, Royal Field Artillery
- Captain Robert William Ardagh, Royal Field Artillery
- 2nd Lieutenant Benjamin Arkle, Liverpool Regiment
- 2nd Lieutenant Cecil George Arkwright, Northumberland Fusiliers
- 2nd Lieutenant Tom Elsworth Armistead, West Yorkshire Regiment
- Company Sergeant Major John Henry Armitage, Northumberland Fusiliers
- Temp Captain George Jackson Armstrong, West Yorkshire Regiment
- Temp Captain Walter Launcelot Armstrong, General List
- Lieutenant John Sigismund Arthur, Royal Artillery
- Company Sergeant Major Frank Edgar Ash, Liverpool Regiment
- Temp Captain George F. Ashton, Northumberland Fusiliers
- Temp Lieutenant Herbert Courtenay Atkin-Berry, Machine Gun Corps
- Captain Surtees Atkinson, Royal Field Artillery
- 2nd Lieutenant Jehu Fosbrooke Gerrard Aubin, Durham Light Infantry
- Captain Robert Starmer Audas, Royal Army Veterinary Corps, employed Egyptian Army
- 2nd Lieutenant Wentworth Murray Austin, Wiltshire Regiment
- Lieutenant Samuel James Manson Auld, Royal Berkshire Regiment
- Lieutenant Sir William Eric Thomas Avery, Bt, Army Service Corps
- Temp 2nd Lieutenant Charles Axten, Royal Field Artillery, attached Trench Mortar Battery
- 2nd Lieutenant Ernest Robert Crocket Aylett, Northamptonshire Regiment
- Temp Lieutenant Walter Edgar Aylwin, Bedfordshire Regiment
- Temp Lieutenant Myers Babington, Royal Engineers
- 2nd Lieutenant Noel Francis Bacon, Royal Artillery, attached Trench Mortar Battery
- Captain Richard Romer Claude Baggallay, Irish Guards
- Temp Captain Horace Stanley Bagshaw, Manchester Regiment
- Rev. Charles Henry Bailey, Royal Army Chaplains' Department
- Temp Lieutenant James Oswald Baird, Royal Engineers
- 2nd Lieutenant Colin Willoughby Baker, Leicestershire Regiment
- 2nd Lieutenant Eric William Baldwin, Royal Fusiliers
- Temp Lieutenant Charles William Robert Ball, Machine Gun Corps
- Temp Captain Frank Leslie Ball, East Yorkshire Regiment
- Temp Captain Thomas Balston, General List
- Captain Cyril d'Albini Sykes Banks, Royal Garrison Artillery
- Temp Captain John Cook Banks, King's Royal Rifle Corps
- Captain Kenneth Barge, Indian Army
- 2nd Lieutenant Stanley Randall Barham, Royal Field Artillery
- Temp Lieutenant Charles William Tone Barker, Durham Light Infantry
- 2nd Lieutenant Archie Fairbairn Barnes, Gloucestershire Regiment
- Temp 2nd Lieutenant Harry Farquharson Barnes, Royal Field Artillery
- Temp Lieutenant The Honourable Ronald Gorell Barnes, Rifle Brigade
- Captain William Gordon Barnes, Royal Army Veterinary Corps
- Temp Lieutenant Alexander Barnett, Royal Irish Rifles
- Temp Lieutenant Reginald Walter Barnett, King's Royal Rifle Corps
- Temp Captain George Barnett, late Army Service Corps
- Temp Captain Robert McGowan Barrington-Ward, Duke of Cornwall's Light Infantry
- Company Sergeant Major Frederick James Barren, Royal Welsh Fusiliers
- Temp Captain Sidney Norman Barron, Royal Engineers
- Temp Captain Francis Richard Barry, Royal Field Artillery
- Captain Richard Augustin Marriott Basset, Royal West Surrey Regiment
- Rev. Edward Yeld Bate, Royal Army Chaplains' Department
- Lieutenant John Percival Bate, Worcestershire Regiment
- Captain Austin Graves Bates, Royal Artillery
- Company Sergeant Major Joseph Battilana, Yorkshire Light Infantry
- Temp 2nd Lieutenant Charles William Beadle, East Surrey Regiment
- Lieutenant Allan Oswald Rufus Beale, Bedfordshire Regiment
- Temp Captain Herbert Luis Beardsley, Leicestershire Regiment
- 2nd Lieutenant Basil Perry Beale, Army Service Corps
- Sergeant Major George Dunn Bedson, Royal Highlanders
- 2nd Lieutenant George Arthur Beggs, London Regiment
- Temp Captain Delvine Bell, MB, Royal Army Medical Corps
- Lieutenant Eastman Bell, Yeomanry
- Temp Captain Francis Gordon Bell, MD FRCS, Royal Army Medical Corps
- Lieutenant John Joseph James Bell, Royal Field Artillery
- Temp Captain Sidney Lara Bell, West Yorkshire Regiment
- Lieutenant William Ivor Bell, Royal Engineers
- Captain Hugh Maurice Bellamy, Lincolnshire Regiment
- Captain Froude Dillon Bellew, Somerset Light Infantry
- Lieutenant Philip Reginald Bence-Jones, Royal Engineers
- Rev. Arnold John Bennett, Royal Army Chaplains' Department
- Temp Lieutenant John Lewis Birkbeck Bentley, Royal Horse Artillery
- Lieutenant Percy Bentley, Yorkshire Light Infantry
- Captain Francis George Joseph Berkeley, Hampshire Regiment
- Temp Lieutenant Oliver Percy Bernard, Royal Engineers
- Temp Captain Alexander Tennant Mackintosh Berney-Ficklin, Norfolk Regiment
- Temp Captain Edwin Aris Berrisford, Royal Engineers
- Temp Lieutenant Owen Charles Bevan, Royal Artillery
- Lieutenant Gordon Beveridge, Royal Field Artillery
- Temp 2nd Lieutenant Edmund George Bingham, Yorkshire Regiment
- Temp Captain Stanley Norman Bingley, Royal Artillery
- 2nd Lieutenant Arthur Lennox Binns, Lincolnshire Regiment
- Temp Lieutenant P. C. Binns, General List, attached Trench Mortar Battery
- 2nd Lieutenant Leonard Sanderson Birbeck, West Yorkshire Regiment
- Lieutenant Henry Theodore Bircham, Durham Light Infantry
- Lieutenant William Birrell, East Kent Regiment
- Company Sergeant Major Thomas Bishop, Gloucestershire Regiment
- Lieutenant George Bissett, 1st Battalion Royal Scots Fusiliers
- 2nd Lieutenant Cyril Anderson Blackburn, Royal Garrison Artillery
- 2nd Lieutenant Leonard Arthur Blackett, King's Royal Rifle Corps
- Temp Captain Robert Dallas Blackledge, Highland Light Infantry
- Captain Gilbert Blaine, Somerset Light Infantry
- 2nd Lieutenant Thomas Stapleton Blakeley, Royal Lancaster Regiment
- Drill Sergeant Company Sergeant Major Walter Bland, Welsh Guards
- Temp Captain John Eastman Blow, Royal Engineers
- 2nd Lieutenant Charles Eric Boast, Royal Engineers
- Lieutenant Frederick Ernest Bodel, Liverpool Regiment, attached Trench Mortar Battery
- Lieutenant Thomas Leonard Boden, Middlesex Regiment
- Temp 2nd Lieutenant Robert Alexander Bogue, Highland Light Infantry
- Lieutenant Richard Bolster, Royal Field Artillery
- 2nd Lieutenant Eustace Walter Booth, South Staffordshire Regiment
- Temp Captain Arthur George Bootle-Wilbraham, Royal Engineers
- Temp Lieutenant William Heron Berwick, Royal Field Artillery
- Temp Captain John Francis Bourke, Royal Army Medical Corps
- 2nd Lieutenant Walter James Boutall, London Regiment
- Captain Aubrey Percival Bowen, Shropshire Light Infantry
- Captain George Eustace Summers Bowen, Royal Field Artillery
- Temp Lieutenant Edwin Guthrie Bowers, Northumberland Fusiliers
- Captain George Edward Wentworth Bowyer, Oxfordshire & Buckinghamshire Light Infantry
- Quartermaster and Honorary Lieutenant Joseph Bowyer, Lancashire Fusiliers
- Temp Captain Hedley Boyers, MB, Royal Army Medical Corps
- Temp Lieutenant James Boyle, Royal Engineers
- Temp Captain Lewis Ceilings-Boyle, Royal Engineers
- Temp Lieutenant Alan Geoffrey Brace, Royal Engineers
- Temp Lieutenant George Bradstock, Royal Field Artillery
- Temp Captain Brian Challoner Brady, Northumberland Fusiliers
- Rev. Kevin Richard Brady, Royal Army Chaplains' Department
- Temp 2nd Lieutenant Albert Newby Braithwaite, General List, attached Trench Mortar Battery
- Captain William Hodgson Braithwaite, West Yorkshire Regiment
- Captain Douglas Stephenson Branson, York & Lancaster Regiment
- Temp 2nd Lieutenant Dennis James Brass, Lincolnshire Regiment
- Captain Eustace Arthur Bray, East Yorkshire Regiment
- Lieutenant George Bray, Royal Engineers
- Lieutenant Clement Noel Brewin, Royal Garrison Artillery
- 2nd Lieutenant Edward Ettingdere Bridges, Oxfordshire & Buckinghamshire Light Infantry
- 2nd Lieutenant Arthur Ernest Brock, Royal Garrison Artillery
- Quartermaster and Honorary Lieutenant Samuel Brocklehurst, King's Own Scottish Borderers
- Temp Captain Charles Gordon Brodie, Royal Engineers, late Hampshire Regiment
- Captain Walter Lorrain Brodie, VC, Highland Light Infantry
- Temp Lieutenant John Coventry Bromhall, Machine Gun Corps
- Temp Captain Henry James Brooks, Manchester Regiment
- Temp 2nd Lieutenant Edward James Brooman, Lancashire Fusiliers
- Temp 2nd Lieutenant Ammiel Ezra Brown, Hampshire Regiment
- Lieutenant Horace Manton Brown, Suffolk Regiment
- Honorary Captain Peter Thomas Brown, Army Ordnance Depot
- Lieutenant Robert Arnold Brown, Argyll & Sutherland Highlanders
- Temp Lieutenant William Edward Leighton Brown, Cheshire Regiment
- Temp Captain George Edward Allenby Browne, Liverpool Regiment
- Temp Captain Edgar Lionel Browning, South Staffordshire Regiment
- Company Sergeant Major John Brucass, Middlesex Regiment
- Rev. Percy Middleton Brumwell, Royal Army Chaplains' Department
- 2nd Lieutenant Alexander Bryce, Royal Scots Fusiliers, attached Machine Gun Corps
- Temp Lieutenant John Humphrys Way Buckell, Royal Engineers
- Temp Lieutenant Peter Burton Buckley, Royal Engineers
- Captain Francis Henry Budden, Royal Engineers
- Temp Captain Geoffrey Armstrong Buddie, Royal Engineers
- 2nd Lieutenant Eric Tremayne Buller, Duke of Cornwall's Light Infantry
- Captain Robert Burgess, Royal Army Medical Corps
- Quartermaster and Honorary Major John Burke, Royal Dublin Fusiliers
- Temp Lieutenant Harold Burke-Jacklin, Royal Field Artillery, attached Trench Mortar Battery
- Temp Captain Richard Parry Burnett, South Staffordshire Regiment
- Lieutenant Percival Ernest Burrows, Nottinghamshire & Derbyshire Regiment
- Temp Captain George Beatty Burwell, MB, Royal Army Medical Corps
- Temp 2nd Lieutenant Eric Lindsay Bury, Royal Engineers
- Captain Basil Harding Butler, Royal Field Artillery
- Quartermaster and Honorary Lieutenant Ernest George Butler, West Yorkshire Regiment
- Captain Richard Brooke Butler-Stoney, Royal Field Artillery
- 2nd Lieutenant Harry Lewis Butterworth, Royal Engineers
- 2nd Lieutenant Reginald Harry Cale, Royal West Kent Regiment
- Regimental Sergeant Major William Callaghan, Royal Munster Fusiliers
- Temp 2nd Lieutenant Percival Alfred Calton, West Yorkshire Regiment
- Captain Alan Charles Cameron, York & Lancaster Regiment
- 2nd Lieutenant Aylmer Lochiel Cameron, Royal Field Artillery
- Temp Captain John William Cameron, Special List, attached Trench Mortar Battery
- 2nd Lieutenant John Brown Corrie Cameron-Mitchell, Royal Engineers
- Temp Captain Cyril Cammack, North Lancashire Regiment
- Temp Lieutenant Alan Urquhart Campbell, Royal Naval Division attached Trench Mortar Battery
- Lieutenant Harold James Campbell, Guards Divisional Ammunition Column, Royal Field Artillery
- 2nd Lieutenant John Haydon Cardew, Royal Field Artillery
- Lieutenant Reginald William Cardew, Royal Engineers
- Captain Robert John Henry Carew, Royal Dublin Fusiliers
- Captain Cecil Thomas Carfrae, Royal Field Artillery
- Captain Frederick Montague Methuen Carlisle, Highland Light Infantry
- Lieutenant John Charles Deriton Carlisle, London Regiment
- Temp Lieutenant Mathew Carr, Royal Scots Fusiliers
- Captain Charles Frederick Carson, Royal Engineers
- Captain Francis Samuel Carson, Royal Army Medical Corps
- Temp 2nd Lieutenant George Watson Carson, Liverpool Regiment
- Temp Lieutenant Joseph Baldwin Carson, Royal Horse Artillery
- Lieutenant Percy Carter, Worcestershire Regiment
- Temp Captain Samuel Wilfrid Carty, Army Service Corps
- Captain Colin Cassidy, MB, Royal Army Medical Corps, employed Egyptian Army
- Temp 2nd Lieutenant George Edward Caswell, Northumberland Fusiliers
- Temp Captain Malcolm Cathcart, Northamptonshire Regiment
- Lieutenant Thomas Francis Cavenagh, Royal Field Artillery
- Temp Captain Ronald Newton Caws, Gloucestershire Regiment
- Temp 2nd Lieutenant Thomas Edward Chad, Royal Sussex Regiment
- Temp Captain Cyril Roy Chambers, South Lancashire Regiment
- Temp Lieutenant Ernest John Collis Chapman, General List
- Lieutenant Henry Ernest Chapman, Royal Field Artillery
- 2nd Lieutenant Richard Charnock, Liverpool Regiment
- 2nd Lieutenant Henry Cheesemond, Northumberland Fusiliers
- Captain Ralph Chenevix-Trench, Royal Engineers
- Lieutenant Ralph Eric Maxwell Cherry, West Yorkshire Regiment
- Captain Robert Graeme Cherry, Royal Field Artillery and Royal Flying Corps
- Temp Captain Alexander Bruce Cheves, MB, Royal Army Medical Corps
- Captain Joseph Lister Cheyne, Lancers
- 2nd Lieutenant Hugh Faithful Chittenden, Royal Sussex Regiment
- Temp Captain Emelius Charles Chomier, South Wales Borderers
- Temp Lieutenant Joseph Roberts Cholerton, Nottinghamshire & Derbyshire Regiment
- Temp Lieutenant John Murray Chrystal, Royal Engineers
- Company Sergeant Major Alfred Charles Church, Royal Engineers
- Temp 2nd Lieutenant James Archibald Church, Royal Engineers
- Captain Alfred Joseph Clark, Royal Army Medical Corps
- Temp 2nd Lieutenant John William Dixon Clarke, Oxfordshire & Buckinghamshire Light Infantry
- Captain Thomas Courtenay Clarke, Royal Army Medical Corps
- Sergeant Major William Clarke, Liverpool Regiment
- Temp Captain Harold Claxton, Special List
- Captain Herbert Henry Spender Clay, Life Guards
- Temp 2nd Lieutenant Robert Richard Clay, Dorsetshire Regiment
- Temp Lieutenant Thomas Harry Clegg, Manchester Regiment
- Lieutenant Eric Charles Clifford, Royal Field Artillery
- Temp Captain John Clough, Motor Machine Gun Corps
- Temp Lieutenant Herbert Wallis Coales, Royal Engineers
- Temp Lieutenant Maurice Lake Cobb, Royal Engineers
- Captain Guy Fromanteel Cobbold, York & Lancaster Regiment
- 2nd Lieutenant Stanley d'Eyncourt Colam, Gordon Highlanders
- Temp Captain Guy Cecil Richard Coleridge, South Staffordshire Regiment
- Temp Captain Samuel Edward Collier, Essex Regiment
- Lieutenant Arthur Francis St. Clair Collins, Army Service Corps
- Temp Captain Henry Archer Colt, Gloucestershire Regiment
- Temp Lieutenant Edward Walter David Colt-Williams, Army Service Corps
- Sergeant Major James William Oscar Columbine, West Riding Regiment
- Temp Captain George Henry Comport, Royal Engineers
- Temp 2nd Lieutenant Thomas Rathesay Conning, Royal Welsh Fusiliers
- Lieutenant Herbert Norman Constantino, Yorkshire Regiment
- Captain Joseph Gabbett Maunsell Butterworth Cooke, Royal Garrison Artillery
- 2nd Lieutenant Wilfrid Edward Cooke, Royal Field Artillery
- 2nd Lieutenant John Cecil Coombes, Oxfordshire & Buckinghamshire Light Infantry, attached Trench Mortar Battery
- Temp 2nd Lieutenant Edward Priestley Cooper, East Yorkshire Regiment
- Temp 2nd Lieutenant Sydney George Cordwell, Leicestershire Regiment
- 2nd Lieutenant Charles Edward Correll, Yorkshire Regiment
- 2nd Lieutenant John Charles Corsan, Royal Field Artillery
- Sub Conductor Frederick Richard Costigan, Army Ordnance Corps
- Temp Captain John Sewell Courtauld, General List
- Rev. John Dey Coutts, Royal Army Chaplains' Department
- Captain William McCrea Cleeve Cowan, Royal Field Artillery
- Captain Arthur Basil Cowburn, Border Regiment
- Temp Lieutenant Noel Bruce St. John Cowie, Royal Field Artillery
- Temp Captain Richard John Cowser, Army Service Corps
- 2nd Lieutenant Cyril Ernest Cox, Middlesex Regiment
- Temp Captain James Wolseley Cox, East Lancashire Regiment
- Captain Ralph George Snead Cox, Royal Inniskilling Fusiliers, attached Machine Gun Corps
- Captain Archibald Craig, Argyll & Sutherland Highlanders
- Temp Captain George Washington Cooper Craik, General List, attached Trench Mortar Battery
- Captain Hugh Gregan Crawford, Royal Army Medical Corps
- Lieutenant Cedric Basil Hartley Crawshaw, Royal Engineers
- Lieutenant Duncan Vandeleur Creagh, Hussars
- Temp Captain Andrew Gavin Maitland Makgill Crichton, Cameron Highlanders
- Captain George Keeble Crichton, Lowland Divisional Train, Army Service Corps
- Temp Captain Richard Howe Crichton, Royal Munster Fusiliers
- Temp Captain Percy Greville Howard Cripps, Duke of Cornwall's Light Infantry
- Lieutenant Norman Richard Crockatt, Royal Scots
- Temp Captain Douglas Edward Crosbie, Royal Army Medical Corps
- Company Sergeant Major Charles Cross, Machine Gun Corps, formerly Norfolk Regiment
- Captain William Henry Francis Crowe, Royal Field Artillery
- Temp Lieutenant Maxwell William Frederic Cullinan, King's Royal Rifle Corps
- Captain Arthur Gordon Cummins, MB, Royal Army Medical Corps, employed Egyptian Army
- 2nd Lieutenant Cecil Cundall, Royal Inniskilling Fusiliers
- Company Sergeant Major Thomas Cunningham, Cameron Highlanders
- Captain William Sidney Noel Curie, Royal Field Artillery
- Captain Archibald Douglas Currie, Royal Field Artillery
- 2nd Lieutenant John Dorrien Constable Curtis, Royal Lancaster Regiment
- Temp Captain Philip Pinckney Curtis, Hussars
- 2nd Lieutenant Raymond Howarth Cutting, Devonshire Regiment, commanding Machine Gun Company
- Temp Lieutenant Cedric Hunton Daggett, Northumberland Fusiliers
- Temp Lieutenant Thomas Daish, Royal Engineers
- Temp Lieutenant Paul Dalton, Rifle Brigade
- 2nd Lieutenant William Daly, East Lancashire Regiment
- Temp Lieutenant Cyril Danby, General List and Royal Flying Corps
- Temp Captain Clive Collingwood Dangar, Special List (late Hussars)
- Temp Major Thomas Edward St. Clare Danniell, General List and Royal Flying Corps
- Captain Cecil Francis Davey, Reserve
- Temp Captain William Edgsworth David, MB, Royal Army Medical Corps
- Captain Duncan Davidson, MB, Royal Army Medical Corps
- Captain Edward Humphrey Davidson, Gordon Highlanders
- Temp Lieutenant Evan Davies, Welsh Regiment
- Company Sergeant Major Henry Lewis Davies, Middlesex Regiment
- Captain Otto Hanbury Davies, Royal Garrison Artillery
- Temp Lieutenant Thomas Henry Davies, Royal Engineers
- Temp Captain John Ogilvie Davis, Royal Flying Corps, Special Reserve
- Company Sergeant Major Henry Davison, Scots Guards, attached Gordon Highlanders
- Captain Hugh Frank Dawes, Royal Fusiliers
- Captain Alfred Dawson, Royal Field Artillery
- 2nd Lieutenant Frank Dawson, Northumberland Fusiliers
- Temp Captain James Maclaren Dawson, Royal Army Veterinary Corps
- Temp Lieutenant Mark Scott Duncan Day, Royal Engineers
- Temp 2nd Lieutenant Shirley Cuthbert Day, Nottinghamshire & Derbyshire Regiment
- Temp Lieutenant Lancelot Colin William Deane, South Wales Borderers
- Lieutenant George Dudley DeAth, Royal Engineers
- Captain Murray Heathfield Dendy, Royal Artillery
- Captain Guy de Hoghton, Yorkshire Light Infantry, attached Machine Gun Corps
- Temp Captain Kenneth de Jong, Royal Sussex Regiment
- 2nd Lieutenant John Joseph Dempsey, Scottish Rifles
- Temp Captain Harold Henry de Laessoe, General List
- Captain Humphrey Edmund de Trafford, Coldstream Guards
- Temp 2nd Lieutenant Colin Deuchar, Northumberland Fusiliers
- Temp 2nd Lieutenant Richard Harding Frank Devereaux, Rifle Brigade
- Staff Sergeant Major Ernest Dickinson, Army Service Corps
- Lieutenant William Everard Dickson, Lancashire Fusiliers, attached Machine Gun Company
- Captain John March Diggles, Cheshire Regiment
- Temp Lieutenant Thomas Brabazon Disney, Royal Engineers
- Quartermaster and Honorary Lieutenant John Disselduff, Argyll & Sutherland Highlanders
- Lieutenant Joseph Gilbert Dixon, Worcestershire Regiment
- Temp Lieutenant Reginald Malyn Dixon, Royal Engineers
- Temp 2nd Lieutenant Vernon Gilbert Dixon, King's Royal Rifle Corps
- Temp Lieutenant Alfred Percival Dobson, Royal Berkshire Regiment, attached Machine Gun Company
- 2nd Lieutenant Philip Henley Dodgson, Royal Field Artillery
- Temp 2nd Lieutenant George William Arthur Doe, Devonshire Regiment
- Temp Lieutenant Henry Eric Dolan, Headquarters, Royal Field Artillery
- Captain Daniel Dougal, Royal Army Medical Corps
- Temp Lieutenant Charles Stuart Douglas, Nottinghamshire & Derbyshire Regiment
- Rev. William Joseph Doyle, Royal Army Chaplains' Department
- Captain John Hughes Drake, Yeomanry
- Temp 2nd Lieutenant Leonard Apthorpe Draper, Royal Fusiliers, attached Machine Gun Company
- Temp Lieutenant William Basil Yeatman Draper, Royal Engineers
- Company Sergeant Major John Drayson, Northumberland Fusiliers
- Lieutenant Evelyn Hugh James Duberly, Grenadier Guards
- Temp 2nd Lieutenant James Edward Duffield, Leinster Regiment
- Temp 2nd Lieutenant Cecil Duffitt, Royal Engineers
- Temp Captain Robert Norman Duke, Royal Highlanders
- Captain Thomas Ingram Dun, MB, Royal Army Medical Corps
- Lieutenant Alan Gomme Duncan, London Regiment
- Temp Captain George Wilson Duncan, Seaforth Highlanders
- Captain Charles Stuart Dunkley, Welsh Regiment
- Lieutenant John Kinninmont Dunlop, London Regiment, attached Machine Gun Company
- Temp Captain John Leeper Dunlop, MB, Royal Army Medical Corps
- Lieutenant Raymond Frederick Dunnett, Worcestershire Regiment
- Battery Quartermaster Sergeant William Dunsmore, Highland Light Infantry
- Captain James Alfred Durie, Royal Highlanders
- Captain Thomas Edwin Durie, Royal Field Artillery
- Temp Lieutenant Kingsley Dykes, Royal West Kent Regiment
- 2nd Lieutenant William Easten, Northumberland Fusiliers
- Captain Hugh William Viscount Ebrington, Dragoons
- Captain Henry Charles Hamilton Eden, Royal Field Artillery
- Temp Captain Beresford Harry Huey Edkins, Army Service Corps, attached Machine Gun Corps
- Captain Charles Derwent Edwards, MD, Royal Army Medical Corps
- 2nd Lieutenant Edward Edwards, Lincolnshire Regiment
- Captain Guy Janion Edwards, Coldstream Guards
- Captain Harold Walter Edwards, Royal Warwickshire Regiment
- John Henry Edwards, Middlesex Regiment
- Temp 2nd Lieutenant Franklin George Ekins, Royal Irish Regiment
- Temp Captain Sacheverelle Pole Eldrid, Wiltshire Regiment
- Temp 2nd Lieutenant Valentine Byron Curzon de Pole Eldrid, General List, attached Trench Mortar Battery
- Quartermaster and Honorary Major Alfred Ellam, West Riding Regiment
- Temp Lieutenant George Fothergill Ellenberger, Yorkshire Light Infantry
- Honorary Captain Henry Frederick Elliott, Army Ordnance Depot
- Lieutenant John Gray Ellis, London Regiment
- Captain Richard Stanley Ellis, Royal Field Artillery
- Captain Arthur Addison Ellwood, Lincolnshire Regiment, attached Machine Gun Company
- Temp Captain Wilfrid Elstob, Manchester Regiment
- Temp 2nd Lieutenant Arthur Alexander English, Royal Engineers
- Temp Lieutenant William Richard English-Murphy, South Staffordshire Regiment
- Temp Captain Lionel Ensor, Suffolk Regiment
- Temp Lieutenant James Epps, Royal Engineers
- Temp Captain Evan Evans, Royal Army Medical Corps
- Captain Sydney Gerald Evans, Royal Sussex Regiment
- Battery Quartermaster Sergeant Thomas Evans, Royal Scots
- Company Sergeant Major Walter Evans, Worcestershire Regiment
- Temp 2nd Lieutenant George Thomas Eve, Royal Engineers
- Temp Quartermaster and Honorary Lieutenant Frederick George Evenden, Royal Army Medical Corps
- Temp 2nd Lieutenant Horace John Everett, Bedfordshire Regiment
- Temp Lieutenant Arthur Potter Evershed, Royal Field Artillery
- Temp Lieutenant George Fairbairn, Royal Engineers
- Temp Captain Donald Farquharson, General List
- Temp Lieutenant Sydney Farr, Royal Field Artillery
- Captain James Edward Fasken, Army Service Corps
- Temp Captain John Champion Faunthorpe, General List
- Temp Captain Walter Fawcus, Northumberland Fusiliers
- Lieutenant Reginald William Lyon Fellowes, MC, Royal Field Artillery
- Temp Major Sidney Fenner, Royal Berkshire Regiment
- Lieutenant George Ferguson, Royal Field Artillery
- Captain Philip Hew Ferguson, Royal Field Artillery
- 2nd Lieutenant Edward Hubert Field, Royal Field Artillery
- Temp Lieutenant Arthur Percival Figgins, Welsh Regiment
- Temp 2nd Lieutenant Ernest Victor Finch, Lancashire Fusiliers
- Temp Captain Vernon Shaw Taylor Fincken, General List, attached Yorkshire Light Infantry
- Captain Charles Bannatyne Findlay, Royal Artillery
- Temp Lieutenant William Eric Fisher, Army Service Corps
- Temp Captain James Gerald Edward FitzGerald, Machine Gun Corps
- Temp Lieutenant Maurice Harrington FitzGerald, Royal Munster Fusiliers
- 2nd Lieutenant John Aloysius FitzHerbert, Royal Garrison Artillery
- Captain Ernest Gale Fleming, Royal Field Artillery
- Captain Thomas Gordon Fleming, MB, Royal Army Medical Corps
- Quartermaster, Honorary Lieutenant and Temp Major Albert Fletcher, Royal Flying Corps
- Temp 2nd Lieutenant Louis Edward Flint, Nottinghamshire & Derbyshire Regiment
- Temp Captain Francis Flood-Page, Royal Engineers
- Temp Captain Robert William Foot, Royal Artillery
- Captain John Lachlan Forbes, Royal Garrison Artillery
- Captain James Forbes-Robertson, Border Regiment
- Temp Captain Careleton Yates Ford, MD, Royal Army Medical Corps
- Company Sergeant Major Henry Charles Ford, Royal Welsh Fusiliers
- Temp 2nd Lieutenant Hubert Forrest, Royal Garrison Artillery, attached Trench Mortar Battery
- 2nd Lieutenant John Campbell Forsyth, Royal Highlanders
- Lieutenant Frederick William Foster, Royal Warwickshire Regiment
- Lieutenant Neville John Acland Foster, Royal Field Artillery
- Temp Captain Alfred Fox, Royal Field Artillery
- Captain Marmaduke Sextus Fox, Highland Light Infantry
- Temp 2nd Lieutenant Ralph Henry Shoolbred Fox, Royal Engineers
- Temp Captain Cecil James Francis, Northumberland Fusiliers
- Temp Lieutenant Douglas James Fraser, Royal Field Artillery
- Temp Captain Donald Thomas Fraser, MB, Royal Army Medical Corps
- Lieutenant Francis Hugh Fraser, West Riding Regiment
- Captain John Fraser, MB, Royal Army Medical Corps
- Quartermaster and Honorary Lieutenant Charles Henry Frazier, Manchester Regiment
- Lieutenant Walter Hanson Freeman, West Yorkshire Regiment
- Quartermaster and Honorary Captain Sidney Freestone, Essex Regiment
- Lieutenant Lancelot Gerhard Freeth, Royal Engineers
- Company Sergeant Major Samuel Stephen Froud, Army Service Corps
- Temp Captain Archibald Fullerton, MB, Royal Army Medical Corps
- Temp Captain William Stanley Furness, Royal Inniskilling Fusiliers
- Captain Harry Read Gadd, Suffolk Regiment
- Captain Henry Davis Gale, Royal Field Artillery
- Temp Captain Harold Rosonlew Gallatly, General List
- Captain William Rickards Galwey, MB, Royal Army Medical Corps
- 2nd Lieutenant Leslie Carr Gamage, London Regiment
- Sergeant Major Robert Gamble, Irish Guards
- 2nd Lieutenant Henry Stobart Gammell, Gordon Highlanders
- Temp Captain Charles Arthur Garden, Special Reserve Battalion, Royal Engineers
- Temp Captain David Gardiner, King's Royal Rifle Corps
- Temp Captain Alfred Thomas Goldie Gardner, Royal Field Artillery
- Temp Lieutenant Kenneth Gordon Garnett, Royal Field Artillery
- Captain Alan Parry Garnier, Northumberland Fusiliers
- Lieutenant Lawrence Francis Garratt, Royal Garrison Artillery
- Temp 2nd Lieutenant Henry Burton-Guest Garrett, General List, attached Trench Mortar Battery
- Captain Richard Vesey Mackay Garry, Royal Garrison Artillery
- Lieutenant Clair James Gasson, South Lancashire Regiment
- 2nd Lieutenant Gordon Smith Mellis Gauld, Royal Field Artillery
- Temp Captain Alastair Cosmo Burton Geddes, General List and Royal Flying Corps
- Lieutenant Horace James Gee, Royal Garrison Artillery
- Lieutenant William Charles Coleman Gell, Royal Warwickshire Regiment
- Captain Gerard Edward James Gent, Duke of Cornwall's Light Infantry
- Temp Captain Paul Gibb, Army Service Corps
- Temp Lieutenant Thomas Telford Gibb, Royal Engineers
- Captain Alfred Joseph Gibbs, Royal Artillery
- Captain Lancelot Merivale Gibbs, Coldstream Guards
- 2nd Lieutenant Newton Gott Gibson, Royal Scots Fusiliers
- Temp Lieutenant Charles Gilchrist, Royal Engineers
- Lieutenant Humfrey Livingston Gilks, London Regiment
- Captain John Galbraith Gill, MB, Royal Army Medical Corps
- Captain Napier John Gill, Royal Artillery and Royal Flying Corps
- Temp Lieutenant Allyne Farmer Gimson, Royal Field Artillery
- Temp 2nd Lieutenant Walter Stanley Gimson, Yorkshire Light Infantry, commanding Trench Mortar Battery
- Temp Lieutenant Robert John Gittins, Machine Gun Company
- Captain Guy de Courcy Glover, South Staffordshire Regiment
- Rev. Edward O'Sullivan Goidanich, Royal Army Chaplains' Department
- Temp 2nd Lieutenant Cyril Harry Golding, Welsh Regiment
- Captain Arthur Vincent Gompertz, Royal Engineers
- Captain Guy Vernon Goodliffe, Royal Fusiliers
- Lieutenant Alan Francis Lindsay-Gordon, Irish Guards
- Temp Lieutenant Bradford Leslie Gordon, Yorkshire Light Infantry
- Temp Captain William Hay Gosse, Royal Field Artillery
- Acting Regimental Sergeant Major Herbert Goulding, Lancashire Fusiliers
- Temp Captain Geoffry Balfour Gourlay, Gordon Highlanders
- Lieutenant Donald James Grant, Argyll & Sutherland Highlanders
- Temp Lieutenant William Grant, Royal Engineers
- Sergeant Major William Gray, Liverpool Regiment
- Quartermaster and Honorary Captain John Henry Greaseley, Leicestershire Regiment
- Temp Lieutenant Albert Green, Royal Engineers
- Temp 2nd Lieutenant Edwin Unsworth-Green, North Lancashire Regiment
- Temp 2nd Lieutenant Gilbert Ware M. Green, Royal Flying Corps
- Captain Ranolf Nelson Greenwood, Cheshire Regiment
- Lieutenant Guy Cochrane Veall Greetham, Somerset Light Infantry
- Captain Arthur Leslie Gregory, Dorsetshire Regiment
- Captain Mancha Gregory, Royal Field Artillery
- Temp Captain Robert Blyth Greig, General List
- Temp Captain James Ross Grieve, Royal Field Artillery
- Rev. Hubert Vavasor Griffiths, Royal Army Chaplains' Department
- Lieutenant Edward William Macleay Grigg, Grenadier Guards
- Captain Stanley Thomas Grigg, West Yorkshire Regiment, attended Camel Corps, Egyptian Army
- Temp 2nd Lieutenant Hugh Noel Grimwade, Durham Light Infantry
- 2nd Lieutenant Herbert Frederick Grizelle, London Regiment
- Captain Richard Raymond de Cruce Grubb, Hussars and Royal Flying Corps
- Captain John Gurdon, East Surrey Regiment
- Temp Lieutenant Reginald Duncan Gwyther, Royal Engineers
- Captain Edward Sidney Hacker, Army Service Corps
- Temp Captain David Hamilton Hadden, MB
- Battery Quartermaster Sergeant Samuel Hague, Gloucestershire Regiment
- Lieutenant Richard Haigh, Royal Berkshire Regiment
- Captain George Harris Haines, Royal Army Medical Corps
- Temp Sub-Lieutenant William Charles Haken, RN
- Divn Captain Harry Alexander Lewis Hall, Royal Engineers
- Lieutenant Henry Ronald Hall, Royal Field Artillery
- Quartermaster and Honorary Lieutenant James Henry Hall, Gordon Highlanders
- Captain Philip Ashley Hall, Oxfordshire & Buckinghamshire Light Infantry
- Lieutenant Roger Hall, Royal Fusiliers
- 2nd Lieutenant James Hugh Halle, Devonshire Regiment
- Temp Captain Robert Morton Hamilton, General List
- Temp Captain Harold Parrish Hamilton, MB, Royal Army Medical Corps
- Lieutenant Hugh Bowenscombe Hammond, Royal Field Artillery, attached Trench Mortar Battery
- Captain Lionel Berkeley Harbord, Indian Army
- Temp Captain George Francis Hardy, Royal Army Medical Corps
- Lieutenant John Herbert Hardy, Royal Lancaster Regiment
- Temp Captain Lancelot Geldert Hare, Yorkshire Regiment
- Captain William Theodore Hare, Royal Army Medical Corps
- Temp Lieutenant Royland Ray Harkus, King's Own Scottish Borderers
- Lieutenant Arthur Leslie Harman, Royal Field Artillery
- Temp Captain Raymond Edwards Harman, Royal Garrison Artillery
- Company Sergeant Major Robert Henry Harper, Gloucestershire Regiment
- Temp Quartermaster and Honorary Lieutenant George Henry Harris, Nottinghamshire & Derbyshire Regiment
- 2nd Lieutenant George Herbert Harrison, North Lancashire Regiment
- Lieutenant Cecil Pryce Harrison, Royal Horse Artillery
- Temp Captain George Arthur Harrison, Royal Engineers
- Sergeant Major Joseph Harrison, South Lancashire Regiment
- Captain William Clavering Hartgill, Royal Army Medical Corps
- 2nd Lieutenant Leslie George Hartmann, Royal Field Artillery
- Temp 2nd Lieutenant Thomas Daniel Harvey, attached Machine Gun Company
- Lieutenant John Francis Haseldine, Royal Engineers
- Sergeant Major Frederick Hatt, Royal Dublin Fusiliers
- Captain Leonard Arthur Hawes, Royal Artillery
- Temp Lieutenant Richard Maurice Hawkins, Royal Fusiliers
- Lieutenant Stanley Hawkins, Honourable Artillery Company
- Lieutenant Douglas Hay, Royal Field Artillery
- Captain Audrey Thomas Husey Hayes, Royal Field Artillery
- Temp 2nd Lieutenant Charles Wyndham Hayes, Royal Engineers
- Quartermaster and Honorary Lieutenant Arthur Hazlegrove, South Staffordshire Regiment
- Captain Norman Canning Healing, Royal Garrison Artillery
- Temp 2nd Lieutenant Christopher Francis Healy, Royal Dublin Fusiliers
- 2nd Lieutenant Frederick William Heath, London Regiment
- Lieutenant Frederick Allan Hellaby, Machine Gun Corps
- Captain Charles Edward Piercy Henderson, Royal Field Artillery
- Temp Captain Gilbert Heron, Royal Field Artillery
- Captain Charles Montague Hewlett, South Lancashire Regiment
- Temp Captain Morris Sadler Heycock, Rifle Brigade
- 2nd Lieutenant Cuthbert Ambrose Anthony Hiatt, Norfolk Regiment and Royal Flying Corps
- Temp Captain John Geoffrey Hibbert, Army Ordnance Depot
- 2nd Lieutenant Eric Raymond Hicks, Royal Field Artillery, attached Medium Trench Mortar Battery
- 2nd Lieutenant William Edward Hicks, Royal Garrison Artillery
- Quartermaster and Honorary Lieutenant Hugh Hidden, Life Guards
- 2nd Lieutenant Daniel Higgins, London Regiment
- Lieutenant John Esmond Longuet Higgins, London Regiment
- Temp Lieutenant Henry Hilditch, Machine Gun Corps
- 2nd Lieutenant Arthur Frederick Creery Hill, Surrey Yeomanry
- Captain Charles Frederick Hill, Suffolk Regiment
- Temp Captain Horace Frederick Hill, Middlesex Regiment
- Lieutenant Ernest Ebenezer Hine, East Lancashire Regiment
- Temp 2nd Lieutenant Joseph Hirst, East Yorkshire Regiment, attached Trench Mortar Battery
- Temp Captain Albert Goring Hoade, General List
- Captain Godfrey Cecil Sanford Hodgson, Yeomanry
- Sergeant Major James Hodson, Manchester Regiment
- Temp Lieutenant Arthur Rupert Pieschell-Hoffmann, Army Service Corps
- Lieutenant John William Hoggart, Royal Field Artillery
- Lieutenant William Corson Holden, Royal Garrison Artillery
- Captain Allen Holford-Walker, Argyll & Sutherland Highlanders, attached Machine Gun Corps
- Temp Captain Frank Holl, Army Service Corps
- Lieutenant Harold Ernest Holland, London Regiment
- Temp Lieutenant Jasper Cyril Holmes, Royal Engineers
- Temp Lieutenant John Seaman Holmes, Royal Engineers
- Sergeant Major William Thomas Holmes, King's Royal Rifle Corps
- Temp Lieutenant George Herbert Hopkins, Liverpool Regiment
- 2nd Lieutenant Gerard Walter Sturges Hopkins, Royal Warwickshire Regiment, attached Trench Mortar Battery
- Captain Rawdon Scott Hopkins, East Yorkshire Regiment
- Temp Captain Edwin James Hornby, Royal Engineers
- Lieutenant Charles Edward Homer, Royal Garrison Artillery
- Temp Captain Wilfred Palmer Horsley, General List, attached Trench Mortar Battery
- 2nd Lieutenant Gilbert Burdett Howcroft, West Riding Regiment
- 2nd Lieutenant Allen Crawford Howard, Royal Engineers
- Temp Lieutenant Edward Howell, North Lancashire Regiment
- Captain Sidney Howes, Lancers
- Company Sergeant Major Albert Howes, London Regiment
- 2nd Lieutenant Charles Frederick Hoyle, Yeomanry
- Temp Captain Walter Musgrave Hoyle, Royal Lancaster Regiment
- Lieutenant Frank Hudson, Royal Flying Corps
- Temp Lieutenant Henry Moore Hudspeth, Royal Engineers
- Temp Captain Christopher Wyndham Hughes, Wiltshire Regiment
- Lieutenant Frederick Llewellyn Hughes, Liverpool Regiment
- Temp Major Joshua Bower Hughes-Games, Durham Light Infantry
- Captain Francis Hugh Huleatt, Royal Field Artillery
- Temp Lieutenant Frederick Charles Humphreys, Somerset Light Infantry
- Company Sergeant Major George Robert Humphriss, Royal Warwickshire Regiment
- Captain Edgar David Cope Hunt, Suffolk Regiment
- Temp Lieutenant Brian Hussey, Royal Engineers
- Lieutenant George Thomas Hutchinson, Oxfordshire Hussars Yeomanry
- Lieutenant Henry Youle Huthwaite, Royal Lancaster Regiment
- 2nd Lieutenant Henry Cyril Harker Illingworth, Royal Berkshire Regiment
- Captain Henry Bouhier Imbert-Terry, Royal Field Artillery
- Captain Robert Lance Impey, MB, Royal Army Medical Corps
- 2nd Lieutenant William Ernest Ind, London Regiment
- Lieutenant Gordon Stewart Inglis, Royal Engineers
- Lieutenant John Drummond Inglis, Royal Engineers
- Captain Alexander Innes, Royal Highlanders
- Lieutenant Raymond Percy Gilbert Ireland, King's Royal Rifle Corps
- Temp Captain Richard Bryan Ireland, Royal Engineers
- Quartermaster and Honorary Lieutenant John Foster Ives, Royal Army Veterinary Corps
- Temp Lieutenant John Jack, Royal Welsh Fusiliers
- Temp Lieutenant John William Jack, Royal Engineers
- Temp Captain Andrew Francis Butler Jackson, Army Service Corps
- Lieutenant Alexander Maclean Jackson, Royal Engineers
- 2nd Lieutenant Ernest Jackson, Royal Engineers
- 2nd Lieutenant Harold Alfred Jackson, Essex Regiment
- Captain Henry Hall Jackson, Hussars
- Temp 2nd Lieutenant Harry Yule Vivian Jackson, Royal Engineers
- Captain Mansel Halket Jackson, Indian Army
- Captain Richard Dingwall Jackson, Royal Engineers
- Temp Captain Theophilus Rudolph Jackson, General List
- Acting Regimental Sergeant Major Charles Frederick Jagger, East Yorkshire Regiment
- Temp Captain Albert John Stanley James, Royal Welsh Fusiliers
- Temp Lieutenant Francis Raymund James, Royal Field Artillery
- Captain Cecil Jarvis, 20th Deccan Horse, Indian Army
- Temp Captain Arthur Alfred Jayne, Royal Engineers
- Temp 2nd Lieutenant Stanley Gordon Jeeves, Royal Engineers
- Captain Wilfred John Jervois, Northamptonshire Regiment
- Lieutenant Samuel Beckett Johns, South Wales Borderers
- Lieutenant Cyril George Johnson, Northumberland Fusiliers
- Temp Captain Herbert Hammond Johnson, Welsh Regiment
- Honorary Captain Robert Charles Johnson, Army Ordnance Depot
- Captain George Gordon Johnstone, MB, Royal Army Medical Corps
- Temp Lieutenant Austin Ellis Lloyd Jones, Headquarters, Royal Artillery
- Captain Cedric La Touche Turner Jones, Royal Engineers
- 2nd Lieutenant Eric Greville Jones, Durham Light Infantry
- Captain Frank Bernard Jones, Oxfordshire & Buckinghamshire Light Infantry
- Lieutenant James Jones, Durham Light Infantry
- Temp 2nd Lieutenant Llewellyn Wynne Jones, Royal Welsh Fusiliers
- Captain Owen Glyndwr Digby Jones, Royal Engineers
- 2nd Lieutenant Owen John Jones, Royal Field Artillery
- Rev. Sidney Jenkins Jones, Royal Army Chaplains' Department
- Battery Quartermaster Sergeant Daniel David Jones, Coldstream Guards
- 2nd Lieutenant Sydney Stevenson Jones, South Lancashire Regiment
- 2nd Lieutenant Peter Crichton Kay, Middlesex Regiment
- Temp Captain Raymond Conrad Murray Keefe, Manchester Regiment
- Temp. Captain Bertram Francis Eardley Keeling, Royal Engineers
- 2nd Lieutenant Augustine Henry Keenan, Royal Highlanders
- Temp Captain David Barrogill Keith, Scottish Rifles
- Captain Thomas James Kelly, MB, Royal Army Medical Corps
- 2nd Lieutenant Alexander Kemp, Royal Engineers
- Captain Geoffrey Chicheley Kemp, B Battery, Royal Field Artillery
- Lieutenant James Crichton Kemp, Royal Scots
- 2nd Lieutenant Joseph Kendall, Lincolnshire Regiment
- Temp Captain Keith Kennard, Army Service Corps
- Captain Charles Courtenay Marshall Kennedy, Hertfordshire Regiment, attached Anzac Corps
- Lieutenant Albert Edmund Kent, Leicestershire Regiment
- 2nd Lieutenant Harold Anthony Kenyon, Royal Engineers
- Temp Lieutenant Robert White Keown, East Kent Regiment
- Sergeant Major Charles Henry Kernot, Royal Flying Corps
- Captain John David Kerr, Nottinghamshire & Derbyshire Regiment
- Lieutenant Loraine Macgregor Kerr, West Yorkshire Regiment
- Company Sergeant Major Peter Kerr, Royal Scots
- Temp Captain Robert Goodman Kerr, Royal Inniskilling Fusiliers
- Company Sergeant Major Arthur Kidd, Cameron Highlanders
- Lieutenant Edward Charles Randolph Kilkelly, Royal Field Artillery
- Temp Lieutenant James Benjamin Kindersley, Royal Field Artillery
- Temp Captain Edward Herbert King, Special List, attached Intelligence Corps
- Company Sergeant Major Harry King, Royal West Surrey Regiment
- Temp Captain Maurice Baylis King, MB, Royal Army Medical Corps
- Temp Captain William James King, Rifle Brigade
- Captain Algernon Robert Fitzhardinge Kingscote, Royal Garrison Artillery
- Lieutenant Reginald George Kinsey, Highland Light Infantry, attached Machine Gun Company
- Temp 2nd Lieutenant Leslie Holbrook Kitton, General List, attached Trench Mortar Battery
- Lieutenant John Kyle, East Yorkshire Regiment, commanding Trench Mortar Battery
- Temp 2nd Lieutenant William George Lacey, Army Service Corps
- Temp Captain Charles John C. La Coste, General List
- Temp Lieutenant John Head Laidman, Royal Artillery, attached Trench Mortar Battery
- 2nd Lieutenant William Frederick Laing, Durham Light Infantry
- Captain Alexander Fane Lambert, Royal Artillery
- Temp Captain Guy Fitzroy Lambert, East Yorkshire Regiment
- Captain Ronald Streeter Lambert, Grenadier Guards
- Lieutenant John Robertson Lamberton, Highland Light Infantry
- Temp 1st Class Staff Sergeant Major Joseph George Lane, Army Service Corps
- Rev. John Lane-Fox, Royal Army Chaplains' Department
- Lieutenant Norman Cyril Lang, Royal Garrison Artillery
- Temp Captain Ernest Theodore Lavarack, Suffolk Regiment
- 2nd Lieutenant Charles Edward William Lavender, Gloucestershire Regiment
- Temp Captain John Herbert George Lawrance, Royal Berkshire Regiment
- Sergeant Major William George Lawrance, Rifle Brigade
- Lieutenant Maurice Edward Seymour Laws, Royal Garrison Artillery
- Captain Ernest Ivory Lea, Royal Warwickshire Regiment
- Captain Robin Seely Leach, Royal Field Artillery
- 2nd Lieutenant William Kenneth Muntz Leader, Duke of Cornwall's Light Infantry
- Temp Captain Claude Lancelot Leake, General List
- Temp Lieutenant George Ledgard, Royal Engineers
- Company Sergeant Major Frederick Charles Leavens, Royal Sussex Regiment
- Temp Lieutenant Audley Andrew Dowell Lee, Leicestershire Regiment
- Lieutenant Kenneth James Lee, Royal Engineers
- 2nd Lieutenant Leslie Gordon Lee, Yorkshire Regiment, attached Trench Mortar Battery
- Temp Captain Francis Thomas Lee-Norman, Royal Engineers
- Captain Frank Bertram Legh, Royal Engineers
- Captain Hubert le Jeune, Royal Flying Corps
- Captain Gerald Quin Lannane, FRCSI, Royal Army Medical Corps
- Temp Lieutenant Hugh William Lester, West Riding Regiment
- Temp 2nd Lieutenant Jack Levy, Royal Fusiliers
- Temp Captain Dudley Lewis, York & Lancaster Regiment
- Temp Captain Malcolm Meredith Lewis, Royal Welsh Fusiliers
- Temp Captain Walter Lewis, Gloucestershire Regiment
- 2nd Lieutenant William Maximilian Lindley, Royal Engineers
- 2nd Lieutenant Robert Strathern Lindsay, Royal Scots
- Lieutenant John Lindsell, North Lancashire Regiment
- Captain Hubert Frederick Ling, Suffolk Regiment
- Captain Robert Walton Ling, Royal Field Artillery
- 2nd Lieutenant Arthur Carr Ashton Litchfield, Royal Field Artillery
- Captain James Lithgow, Royal Garrison Artillery
- Temp 2nd Lieutenant Clarence Robert Little, General List, attached Trench Mortar Battery
- Temp Lieutenant James William Littlejohn, MD, Royal Army Medical Corps
- Captain John Conway Lloyd, South Wales Borderers
- Captain John Daniel Stuart Lloyd, Welsh Horse
- Temp Captain Philip Lloyd-Graeme, King's Royal Rifle Corps
- Battery Sergeant Major Charles Locke, Royal Field Artillery
- 2nd Lieutenant Leslie Keith Lockhart, Royal Field Artillery
- Temp Captain Ambrose Lome Lockwood, MD, Royal Army Medical Corps
- Temp Captain Malcolm Hunter Logan, Royal Engineers
- Captain Cyril Ernest Napier Lomax, Welsh Regiment
- 2nd Lieutenant Reginald Frederick Long, Royal Field Artillery
- Temp Captain Ralph Longstaff, East Yorkshire Regiment
- Captain Reginald Percy Lord, Hampshire Regiment
- 2nd Lieutenant John Scott Lorimer, Norfolk Regiment, commanding Trench Mortar Battery
- Temp Captain Harry Chickall Lott, Royal Sussex Regiment
- Temp Quartermaster and Honorary Lieutenant John Lovelock, Shropshire Light Infantry
- Lieutenant Alban Low, Royal Irish Fusiliers, attached Machine Gun Company
- Temp Captain William Douglas Lowe, Durham Light Infantry
- 2nd Lieutenant Herbert Lowther, Royal Field Artillery
- Temp Lieutenant Cecil John George Luck, Seaforth Highlanders
- Captain David Lumsden, Royal Highlanders
- Captain William Vernon Lumsden, Argyll & Sutherland Highlanders, attached Machine Gun Company
- Temp Major Norman Lunn, Northumberland Fusiliers
- Captain William Ernest Craven Lunn, MB, Royal Army Medical Corps
- 2nd Lieutenant Hugh Ralph Lupton, West Yorkshire Regiment
- Captain Lionel Gallwey Lutyens, Royal Field Artillery
- Surgeon-Captain Evelyn John Hansler Luxmoore, Life Guards
- Captain William Lyall, Gordon Highlanders
- Temp Lieutenant Norman Yates Lyle, Royal Scots Fusiliers
- Temp Captain Sydney James Lyle, Royal Irish Rifles
- Lieutenant Cecil Eric Lewis Lyne, Royal Field Artillery
- Captain Harold Syme Macdonald, Royal Field Artillery
- Temp Lieutenant William Murray Macdonald, Royal Engineers
- Temp Lieutenant John MacFarlane, Royal Fusiliers
- Lieutenant Peter Donald MacFeat, Royal Engineers
- Temp Captain Charles Atkinson Mackenzie, Army Ordnance Depot
- Lieutenant Donald Mackenzie, King's Own Scottish Borderers
- Temp Captain Eric Lofts Mackenzie, MB, Royal Army Medical Corps
- Lieutenant Lionel do Anarel Mackenzie, Gordon Highlanders
- Temp Lieutenant Norman Alexander Mackenzie, Royal Engineers
- Quartermaster and Honorary Captain James Mackie, Gordon Highlanders
- Temp Captain John Duncan Mackie, Argyll & Sutherland Highlanders
- Captain Ronald Gillian Maclaine, Argyll & Sutherland Highlanders, attached Camel Corps, Egyptian Army
- Captain Malcolm Neynoe Macleod, Royal Engineers
- Temp Captain William Macleod, Royal Army Medical Corps
- Captain Alan David Macpherson, Royal Field Artillery
- Temp 2nd Lieutenant Albert Ewart Mainhood, Dorsetshire Regiment
- Captain John Allan Freeman Mair, East Yorkshire Regiment
- Temp 2nd Lieutenant Ralph Lionel Maitland-Heriot, Royal Field Artillery
- 2nd Lieutenant Robert Keith Makant, North Lancashire Regiment
- Conductor Adam Malcolm, Army Ordnance Depot
- Temp Lieutenant Wilfred Reginald Malone, Royal Irish Rifles
- Temp Captain Alfred Malseed, MB, Royal Army Medical Corps
- 2nd Lieutenant Deane Mann, Royal West Surrey Regiment
- 2nd Lieutenant Douglas Mann, Somerset Light Infantry, attached Machine Gun Company
- Temp 2nd Lieutenant Horatio Geoffrey Cornwallis Mann, Royal West Kent Regiment
- Lieutenant John Charles Mann, Royal Welsh Fusiliers
- 2nd Lieutenant James Alexander Mansfield, Royal Irish Fusiliers
- Temp Lieutenant George Malcolm Manuelle, Army Ordnance Depot
- Captain Bernard Oswald March, Royal Field Artillery
- Lieutenant George Frederick March, Nottinghamshire & Derbyshire Regiment
- Temp 2nd Lieutenant Alan William Dobson Mark, Royal Engineers
- Temp 2nd Lieutenant Herbert Henry Marks, Durham Light Infantry
- Lieutenant Arthur Pelham Marriott, Royal Field Artillery
- 2nd Lieutenant Richard Brereton Marriott-Watson, Royal Irish Rifles
- Temp Captain Wallace Marrs, General List
- Captain Robert Marten Weymouth Marsden, Royal Engineers
- Temp 2nd Lieutenant Gordon Marsh, Royal Berkshire Regiment
- Lieutenant James Neville Marshall, Irish Guards
- Captain Jeffery Eardley Marston, Royal Field Artillery
- Temp Captain Claude Kennedy Martin, Devonshire Regiment
- Regimental Sergeant Major David James Martin, Suffolk Regiment
- 2nd Lieutenant Edward Lancelot Martin, Royal Engineers
- Temp Captain Jasper James Martin, Connaught Rangers
- Captain Rutter Barry Martyn, Wiltshire Regiment and Royal Flying Corps
- 2nd Lieutenant Renould Marx, Royal Field Artillery
- Temp Captain Laurence Mason, Royal Artillery
- 2nd Lieutenant William Ewart Mason, North Lancashire Regiment
- Company Sergeant Major Herbert Mathews, Yorkshire Light Infantry
- Temp Captain Duncan Mathieson, Northumberland Fusiliers
- Temp Captain John Cuthbert Matthews, MB, Royal Army Medical Corps
- Temp Captain Charles Raymond Maude, General List
- Captain Godfrey Kindersley Maurice, Royal Army Medical Corps
- Captain Ernest Cassel Maxwell, Cheshire Regiment
- Temp Lieutenant Reginald Stewart Maxwell, General List and Royal Flying Corps
- 2nd Lieutenant Robert Watson McCrone, Royal Engineers
- 2nd Lieutenant Sylvester McDonald, Worcestershire Regiment
- Temp Captain George Robert Denison McGeagh, Royal Army Medical Corps
- Captain Hugh McConnell McHaffie, Argyll & Sutherland Highlanders
- Rev. Joseph McHardy, Royal Army Chaplains' Department
- Captain Kenneth Ian MacIver, Royal Garrison Artillery
- Temp Captain John Walker McKenna, Royal Field Artillery
- Company Sergeant Major Thomas McKenzie, Royal Warwickshire Regiment
- Rev. Joseph Henry McKew, Royal Army Chaplains' Department
- Quartermaster and Honorary Lieutenant William McKinley, Norfolk Regiment
- Temp 2nd Lieutenant John Arthur McKinnell, Seaforth Highlanders
- Temp Lieutenant Thomas McLachlan, Northumberland Fusiliers
- 2nd Lieutenant Alexander McLaren, Army Service Corps
- Temp Captain William McLaren, Highland Light Infantry
- Lieutenant Charles McMaster, General List, attached Trench Mortar Battery
- Captain Hugh McMaster, Royal Field Artillery
- Temp Lieutenant John McMurtrie, Royal Engineers
- Company Sergeant Major William McNally, Worcestershire Regiment
- Lieutenant Alfred George McNaught, Northamptonshire Regiment
- Rev. James Henry McShane, Royal Army Chaplains' Department
- Quartermaster and Honorary Lieutenant John Mead, Royal Flying Corps
- Captain Gerald King Mears, Essex Regiment
- Sergeant Major Alexander Measures, Leicestershire Regiment
- Captain Paul Raymond Meautys, North Staffordshire Regiment
- Lieutenant Edgar Julius Medley, Royal Field Artillery
- Temp Lieutenant Leslie Woodfield Mellonie, Royal Garrison Artillery
- Captain John Seymour Mellor, King's Royal Rifle Corps
- Temp Captain Adam Fisher Menzies, Royal Army Medical Corps
- Captain John Fergusson Menzies, Nottinghamshire & Derbyshire Regiment
- 2nd Lieutenant George Douglas Meredith, Royal Garrison Artillery
- Temp Lieutenant Frederick Gordon Messervy, Royal Artillery
- Temp 2nd Lieutenant R. J. Metcalfe, Devonshire Regiment
- Temp Captain William Francis Mewton, Royal Engineers
- Sergeant Major Albert Charles Middleton, Royal West Surrey Regiment
- Temp Captain Kenneth Earl Millan, MB, Royal Army Medical Corps
- Temp Captain Norman Shera Millican, Liverpool Regiment
- 2nd Lieutenant Percival Findlay Mills, Royal Engineers
- 2nd Lieutenant Charles Howard Goulden Millis, Nottinghamshire & Derbyshire Regiment
- Captain John Milne, Gordon Highlanders
- Rev. Garth Ewart Minnear, Royal Army Chaplains' Department
- Captain Christopher Carrol Mitchell, Royal Field Artillery
- Captain David Johnstone Mitchell, King's Royal Rifle Corps
- 2nd Lieutenant Harold Mitchell, West Yorkshire Regiment
- Captain Thomas Bryson Mitchell, Royal Scots
- Captain William Gore Sutherland Mitchell, Highland Light Infantry and Royal Flying Corps
- Temp Captain Frederick Stewart Modera, Royal Fusiliers
- 2nd Lieutenant John Davenport Newal Molesworth, Lancashire Fusiliers
- Captain Gordon Wickham Monier-Williams, London Regiment
- 2nd Lieutenant Frederick Thomas Monk, Scottish Rifles
- Temp Lieutenant Charles Moore, Army Service Corps
- 2nd Lieutenant Morgan Edward Jellett Moore, Royal Irish Rifles
- Captain John Theodore Cuthbert Moore-Brabazon, Royal Flying Corps
- Captain Miles Ernest Morgan, Royal Engineers
- Temp 2nd Lieutenant Tom Henry Emerson Morgan, Royal Engineers
- Temp Captain Rupert Falshaw Morkill, Royal Engineers
- Temp Major Cyril Clarke Boville Morris, Army Service Corps
- Honorary Captain Frederick Morris, Army Ordnance Depot
- Captain John Morris, MB FRCS, Royal Army Medical Corps, attached Cheshire Regiment
- Temp 2nd Lieutenant George Ernest Morrison, Devonshire Regiment
- Captain Richard Fielding Morrison, Royal Field Artillery
- Captain Walter Francis Morrogh, Machine Gun Corps
- Temp Lieutenant Owen Frederick Morshead, Royal Engineers
- Captain Allen Handfield Morton, Royal Field Artillery and Royal Flying Corps
- 2nd Lieutenant Gilbert Douglas Morton, Liverpool Regiment
- Lieutenant William Noel Jobson Moscrop, Durham Light Infantry
- Lieutenant William Philipson Moss, Royal Irish Rifles
- Captain Joseph Cecil Mary Mostyn, Royal Field Artillery
- Captain Alfred Law Mowat, West Riding Regiment
- Lieutenant Arthur Rupert Moxsy, Royal Inniskilling Fusiliers
- 2nd Lieutenant William Edward Heath Muir, Royal Scots
- Captain Gerald Thomas Mullally, MB, FRCS, Royal Army Medical Corps
- Temp Captain Frederick James Mulqueen, Royal Engineers
- Lieutenant David Campbell Duncan Munro, Gordon Highlanders
- Temp 2nd Lieutenant William Thomson Murchie, Royal Scots Fusiliers, attached Trench Mortar Battery
- 2nd Lieutenant Charles Arthur Campbell Murdoch, Rifle Brigade
- Lieutenant John Cyril Murley, London Regiment, attached Machine Gun Company
- Lieutenant Edmund Victor Burke Murphy, Royal Irish Rifles
- Temp Lieutenant Patrick Joseph Murphy, Leinster Regiment
- Temp Captain Walter Murray, Royal Engineers
- Temp Captain James Sproule Myles, Royal Inniskilling Fusiliers
- Temp Major William Henry Napper, Army Service Corps
- 2nd Lieutenant Alfred Claude Nash, Royal Field Artillery, attached Trench Mortar Battery
- Temp Captain Christopher Raleigh Nash-Wortham, Army Service Corps
- Temp 2nd Lieutenant Frederick Charles Allan Campbell Neal, East Lancashire Regiment
- Mechanic Sergeant Major Charles Blakely Neal, Army Service Corps
- 2nd Lieutenant Alan Skeffington Neale, Leicestershire Regiment
- Temp Captain Frederick Theodore Neale, Oxfordshire & Buckinghamshire Light Infantry
- 2nd Lieutenant Pascall Needham, Royal Warwickshire Regiment
- Temp 2nd Lieutenant Horace Hunter Neeves, Northumberland Fusiliers
- Lieutenant Donald Francis Neilson, Lincolnshire Regiment
- Temp Captain George Nesbit, Northumberland Fusiliers
- Lieutenant Reginald William Newman, Gloucestershire Regiment
- Captain Lanceray Arthur Newnham, Middlesex Regiment
- Temp 2nd Lieutenant Thomas Newton, Lancashire Fusiliers
- Captain Frederick John James Ney, Royal Army Medical Corps
- Temp Captain Joseph Dallas Nicholl, Royal Irish Rifles
- Lieutenant Francis Peter Ross Nichols, Army Service Corps
- Captain Edward Hugh Jasper Nicolls, East Surrey Regiment
- Temp Lieutenant Claud Robert Nightingale, Army Service Corps
- Lieutenant Dudley Nisbet, South Lancashire Regiment
- Temp Lieutenant John Borthwick Nixon, Northumberland Fusiliers
- 2nd Lieutenant Duncan Norman, Royal Engineers
- Captain Geoffrey Schuyler Norman, Royal Irish Regiment
- Lieutenant Louis Cameron Nott, Gloucestershire Regiment
- Temp Lieutenant Douglas Oake, General List, attached Trench Mortar Battery
- Lieutenant Henry John Percy Oakley, Royal Field Artillery
- Captain John Cooke Power O'Brien, Royal Irish Fusiliers
- Rev. Philip Francis Oddie, Royal Army Chaplains' Department
- Temp 2nd Lieutenant Albert Edward Odell, General List, Royal Engineers
- Lieutenant Bryan Bernard Joseph Aloysius O'Donnell, Royal Warwickshire Regiment, attached Machine Gun Corps
- Captain Morgan John Winthrop O'Donovan, Royal Irish Fusiliers
- Company Sergeant Major Charles Roby Oldfield, East Lancashire Regiment
- Temp 2nd Lieutenant John Burleigh Oldfield, Northamptonshire Regiment
- Lieutenant Edward Laurence Olivier, Liverpool Regiment
- 2nd Lieutenant John Denis Circuit Oliver, Royal Artillery, commanding Trench Mortar Battery
- Captain John Barwick Orde, Royal Artillery
- Lieutenant Herbert Joseph M. O'Reilly, Royal Irish Regiment
- Temp Lieutenant Edward Russell Hugh Orford, Royal Munster Fusiliers
- Temp 2nd Lieutenant Alan Ostler, Royal Field Artillery
- Lieutenant Alexander Oswell, Durham Light Infantry
- Captain Robert Edward Otter, London Regiment
- 2nd Lieutenant Charles Edward Ovington, London Regiment, attached Machine Gun Company
- Captain Alfred Lloyd Owen, Royal Engineers
- Temp Lieutenant Bertram Maurice Owen, Royal Engineers
- Temp Lieutenant Edward John Baron Oxenham, Army Ordnance Depot
- Lieutenant Herbert Anselm Oxenham, Royal Flying Corps
- Captain Gerald Stewart Oxley, King's Royal Rifle Corps
- Captain Francis Woodbine Parish, King's Royal Rifle Corps
- Temp Lieutenant Horace Victor Parker, Royal Field Artillery
- Sergeant Major Stanley John Parker, Wiltshire Regiment
- Temp Lieutenant Wilfred Henry Parker, Suffolk Regiment
- Temp Lieutenant Carol Lewis Parkin, Royal Field Artillery
- Captain Herbert Denis Parkin, Army Service Corps
- Captain Leslie Gerard Parkinson, Gloucestershire Regiment
- Lieutenant John Wynand Parks, East Lancashire Regiment
- Temp Lieutenant Wilfred Wharton Parr, Gloucestershire Regiment
- Captain Montagu Martindale Parry-Jones, Royal Fusiliers
- Temp Lieutenant William Linnell Partridge, Royal Army Medical Corps
- Temp Lieutenant Arthur Alexander Adam Paterson, Royal Field Artillery
- Temp 2nd Lieutenant James Hunter Patrick, King's Own Scottish Borderers
- Lieutenant Laird Irvine Cassan Paul, Royal Field Artillery
- 2nd Lieutenant William Paul, West Yorkshire Regiment
- Captain Denys Whitmore Payne, Royal Garrison Artillery
- Lieutenant Ernest William John Payne, Royal Flying Corps
- Temp Captain Joseph Payne, South Lancashire Regiment
- 2nd Lieutenant Arthur Henry Pearce, Royal Garrison Artillery
- Temp Lieutenant Gerald Vyvyan Pearse, Royal Field Artillery
- Temp Captain John Hesketh Pearson, Nottinghamshire & Derbyshire Regiment
- 2nd Lieutenant Ernest George Pease, Northumberland Fusiliers
- 2nd Lieutenant Edward Kenrick Bruce Peck, Manchester Regiment
- Temp Lieutenant George Edgar Peck, Royal Engineers
- Temp Captain John Norman Peck, Liverpool Regiment
- Temp Lieutenant John Edward Pedley, King's Royal Rifle Corps
- Temp Lieutenant Robert Peers, General List, attached Royal Engineers
- Captain Vivian Humphrey Langford Pellew, Royal Garrison Artillery
- Temp Lieutenant Albert James Pelling, Royal Engineers
- Sergeant Major William Henry Pellin, Rifles Brigade
- Temp 2nd Lieutenant Francis Seaton Pemberton, King's Royal Rifle Corps
- Temp Captain Reginald Charles Penfold, Royal Fusiliers
- Captain Frank Penn, Life Guards
- Temp Lieutenant George Penna, King's Royal Rifle Corps
- 2nd Lieutenant Norman Montague Penny, Royal Field Artillery
- Captain Thomas Eward Fraser Penny, Yorkshire Light Infantry
- Lieutenant Claude Quayle Lewis Penrose, Royal Garrison Artillery
- Lieutenant Robert Rawnsley Maxwell Perceval, Royal Field Artillery
- Temp 2nd Lieutenant George Reginald Percy, Royal Engineers
- Temp Captain Michael Perrin, North Lancashire Regiment
- Captain Ivan Cockayne Pery-Knox-Gore, Royal Field Artillery
- Lieutenant Frederick William Petrie-Hay, Gordon Highlanders, attached Machine Gun Company
- Temp Lieutenant Michael Gladstone Pettigrew, Royal Army Medical Corps
- Lieutenant Thomas Henry Peverell, Seaforth Highlanders
- Captain Frederick William Pfeil, Royal Garrison Artillery
- Temp 2nd Lieutenant Albert Edward Phelan, Northumberland Fusiliers
- Battery Quartermaster Sergeant George Thomas Philip, Royal Scots
- 2nd Lieutenant Arnold Webb Phillips, Royal Fusiliers
- Temp Lieutenant Geoffrey Phillips, Royal Field Artillery
- Temp Lieutenant George Cuthbert Davidson Phillips, Royal Engineers
- 2nd Lieutenant Herbert Francis Picker, Royal Engineers
- Temp Captain Gervas Evelyn Pierrepont, General List
- Captain Frederick Alfred Pile, Headquarters, Royal Artillery
- Lieutenant Eward Francis Pipe, East Yorkshire Regiment
- Temp Captain John Herbert Piper, Northamptonshire Regiment
- Temp Lieutenant Charles Harry Pitt, Royal Engineers
- Company Sergeant Major John Alexander Pitt, Shropshire Light Infantry
- Company Sergeant Major John Pittman, Northamptonshire Regiment
- Lieutenant Walter Michael Hungerford Pollen, Scottish Rifles, commanding Machine Gun Company
- Temp Lieutenant William Godfrey Thomas Pope, Royal Engineers
- Temp Lieutenant Norman Porteous, Royal Engineers
- 2nd Lieutenant William Ford Porteous, Middlesex Regiment, attached Machine Gun Company
- Captain Malcolm Tindal Porter, Royal Engineers
- Temp Captain Edward Darley Powell, Royal Engineers
- Captain Henry Royds Pownall, Royal Field Artillery
- Lieutenant Acton Brooke Pratt, Worcestershire Regiment
- Lieutenant Fendall William Harvey Pratt, Royal Garrison Artillery
- Captain The Honourable Hubert Anthony John Preston, Royal Irish Regiment
- Company Sergeant Major Charles Henry Price, Northumberland Fusiliers
- Temp Lieutenant Charles Weaver Price, Machine Gun Company
- 2nd Lieutenant Herbert Allen Price, Somerset Light Infantry, attached Machine Gun Company
- Temp Lieutenant Rhys Clifford Price, General List, attached Trench Mortar Battery
- Sergeant Major William Price, Somerset Light Infantry
- Captain Robert Ulick Hamilton Prioleau, Rifle Brigade
- Temp Captain John Nelson Prior, Royal Engineers
- Temp Lieutenant Leonard Browne Primrose, Royal Engineers
- 2nd Lieutenant Leslie Howson Pullen, London Regiment, attached Machine Gun Company
- Captain Arthur William Purser, Royal Field Artillery
- Company Sergeant Major Charles Robert Purnell, Rifle Brigade
- Temp Captain Andrew Banks Raffle, MD, Royal Army Medical Corps
- 2nd Lieutenant William Raine, Liverpool Regiment
- Lieutenant Rowan Scrope Rait-Kerr, Royal Engineers
- Temp Captain Herwald Ramsbotham, General List
- Temp 2nd Lieutenant William Marshall Ramsay, Northumberland Fusiliers
- Captain Vincent Basil Ramsden, South Wales Borderers
- Temp Lieutenant Douglas Estment Randall, Royal Field Artillery
- 2nd Lieutenant Vincent Washington Hobson Ranger, Oxfordshire & Buckinghamshire Light Infantry
- Temp Lieutenant William Macalister Ransford, Royal Engineers
- Temp Lieutenant Ronald Rawson Rawson, Royal Engineers
- Lieutenant William Lister Read, Cheshire Regiment
- Temp Captain Rupert Frederick William Rebsch, South Wales Borderers
- Captain John Thorpe Reckitt, Army Service Corps
- 2nd Lieutenant Maurice Alexander Reddie, King's Royal Rifle Corps, attached Trench Mortar Battery
- 2nd Lieutenant Francis Vernon Lyne Redman, Royal Garrison Artillery
- Rev. Lancelot George Reed, Royal Army Chaplains' Department
- Temp Major Evan Thomas Rees, South Wales Borderers
- 2nd Lieutenant Wilford Norman Reeve, Dragoon Guards
- Captain Brian Reeves, Royal Welsh Fusiliers
- Captain Arthur William Reid, Royal Engineers
- Rev. Herbert Reid, Royal Army Chaplains' Department
- Temp Lieutenant Ernest Godwin Reidy, Royal Artillery
- Captain William Charles Retallack, Royal Warwickshire Regiment
- Lieutenant Roger Clayton Reynolds, Royal Field Artillery
- Temp Lieutenant Frederick William Richards, Royal Engineers
- Temp Captain Arthur Valentine Richardson, Yorkshire Regiment
- Captain George Carr Richardson, Royal Field Artillery
- Sergeant Major Richard Richardson, Durham Light Infantry
- Temp Captain Arthur Richmond, MB, Royal Army Medical Corps
- 2nd Lieutenant William Frederick Richmond, East Lancashire Regiment
- Lieutenant Herbert Leslie Ridley, Royal Dublin Fusiliers
- 2nd Lieutenant Charles Robinson Robbins, Royal Artillery and Royal Flying Corps
- Temp Captain Frederick John Roberts, Nottinghamshire & Derbyshire Regiment
- Temp Lieutenant Harold Roberts, Royal Engineers
- 2nd Lieutenant Norman Latimer Roberts, Royal Field Artillery (Special Reserve)
- Temp Lieutenant James Huntley Robertson, Lancers
- Temp Captain Charles Douglas Robinson, North Staffordshire Regiment
- Temp Lieutenant Ernest Harold Robinson, Shropshire Light Infantry
- Captain Sir Frederick Villiers Laud Robinson, Bt, Northamptonshire Regiment
- Lieutenant Leslie George Robinson, Reserve of Officers
- Temp Captain Thomas Gerald Robinson, Royal Berkshire Regiment
- Temp 2nd Lieutenant John Patrick Roche, General List, attached Trench Mortar Battery
- Captain James Roche-Kelly, South Irish Horse
- Company Sergeant Major Sidney Herbert Roffey, London Regiment
- Temp Lieutenant Roy Eyton Roller, Royal Field Artillery
- 2nd Lieutenant Francis Hugh Ronksley, Royal Engineers
- Temp Lieutenant Richard Lang Roscoe, Royal Fusiliers
- Temp Captain John Brenchley Rosher, Durham Light Infantry
- Temp Lieutenant Percy Gilbert Ross-Hume, General List and Royal Flying Corps
- Lieutenant Harry Ross-Skinner, Highland Light Infantry
- Temp Captain Henry Joseph Round, Intelligence Corps
- Acting 1st Class Battery Sergeant Major Arthur William Rouse, Army Service Corps
- 2nd Lieutenant Gilbert Rowan, Royal Highlanders
- Lieutenant Robert Berkley Rowett, Royal Garrison Artillery
- Temp Captain Sidney Douglas Rumbold, York & Lancaster Regiment
- Temp Lieutenant Sidney Errell Rumsey, South Wales Borderers
- Temp Lieutenant Charles Hermann Schmettan Runge, General List
- 2nd Lieutenant Edward Frederick Langley Russell, Liverpool Regiment
- Temp Captain James Russell, Highland Light Infantry
- Temp Captain Curteis Fraser Maxwell Norwood Ryan, Royal Engineers, Special Reserve
- Rev. Frank Dowland Ryan, Royal Army Chaplains' Department
- Captain Julian Neil Oscar Rycroft, Royal Highlanders
- 2nd Lieutenant Henry Sadler, Royal Sussex Regiment
- Temp Captain Archibald Safford, Army Service Corps
- Temp Captain Morice Julian St. Aubyn, King's Royal Rifle Corps
- 2nd Lieutenant Henry Alexander Sale, North Staffordshire Regiment, attached Machine Gun Company
- 2nd Lieutenant Arthur Joseph Samut, Wiltshire Regiment
- Captain Samuel E. Sandars, Royal Fusiliers
- Company Sergeant Major Vernus Frederic Bernard Sanders, Nottinghamshire & Derbyshire Regiment
- Company Sergeant Major Douglas Sandilands, East Yorkshire Regiment
- 2nd Lieutenant William Mandeville Sankey, Monmouthshire Regiment
- 2nd Lieutenant James Edward Sargent, Royal Garrison Artillery
- Temp 2nd Lieutenant Edward Eaton Sargint, Royal Irish Fusiliers
- Lieutenant Reginald Stafford Saumarez, London Regiment
- Temp 2nd Lieutenant Horace Charles Saunders, Royal West Surrey Regiment
- Temp Captain Eric Humphrey Savill, Devonshire Regiment
- 2nd Lieutenant Underwood J. Saville, Cambridgeshire Regiment, attached Trench Mortar Battery
- Temp Lieutenant Basil Sawers, Royal Engineers
- Quartermaster and Honorary Lieutenant Edward James Sayer, Yeomanry
- Temp Lieutenant Leslie Sayer, Royal Warwickshire Regiment
- Captain Reginald Oscar Schwarz, King's Royal Rifle Corps
- Sergeant Major Charles Alexander Scott, Royal Highlanders
- Captain George Scott, MD, Royal Army Medical Corps
- Captain James Alwin Colville Scott, Royal Army Medical Corps
- Temp Lieutenant John James Scott, Royal West Kent Regiment
- Temp 2nd Lieutenant Robert Henry Roe Scott, Royal Field Artillery, attached Trench Mortar Battery
- Captain Montague Allan Hume Scott, Royal Engineers
- Temp Lieutenant Sydney Clermont Scott, Essex Regiment
- Temp Captain William Dishington Scott, Highland Light Infantry
- Captain Thomas Henry Sebag-Montefiore, Royal Field Artillery
- 2nd Lieutenant Skinner Raymond Sebastian, Hampshire Regiment
- Lieutenant Edwin Lloyd Sellars, Manchester Regiment
- Temp Captain Edward Owen Sewell, General List
- Temp Lieutenant Thomas Reginald Sewell, Royal Field Artillery
- Captain Arthur Talbot Shakespear, Royal Engineers
- Lieutenant William Shanks, Royal Engineers
- Captain Bernard Marshall Rayment Sharp, East Yorkshire Regiment, commanding Machine Gun Company
- Captain Frederick Roland Studdert Shaw, MB, Royal Army Medical Corps
- Temp Captain George Murray Shaw MB, Royal Army Medical Corps
- Company Sergeant Major John William Shaw, King's Royal Rifle Corps
- Temp Captain William David Shaw, Highland Light Infantry
- Temp Captain Albert Thomas Shead, Army Ordnance Depot
- Temp 2nd Lieutenant Fraser Morton Sheard, General List, attached Trench Mortar Battery
- Temp Lieutenant James Shelly, Royal Engineers
- Temp Lieutenant John Chiene Shepherd, Royal Engineers
- 2nd Lieutenant Walter Scott Shepherd, Wiltshire Regiment
- 2nd Lieutenant Matthew Sheppard, Yorkshire Dragoons
- Temp Captain Hudson Frederick Shepperd, Royal Irish Rifles
- Lieutenant Alan Trevor Shipton, Middlesex Regiment
- Captain Arthur Lafite Sidebottom, Royal Garrison Artillery
- Temp 2nd Lieutenant Thomas Clifton Simpson, Unattended List, attached Royal Munster Fusiliers
- Lieutenant Vere Elliot Ward Simpson, Royal Irish Regiment
- Captain William Arthur John Simpson, Royal Field Artillery
- Captain Frederick Alexander Single, Dragoon Guards
- Company Sergeant Major Albert George Sirett, Oxfordshire & Buckinghamshire Light Infantry
- Temp 2nd Lieutenant Alexander Patrick Skeil, Royal Scots Fusiliers
- Temp Lieutenant Arthur James Skey, Royal Artillery
- Temp Captain Roland Edgar Slade, Royal Engineers
- Temp Lieutenant Charles Howard Slater, Royal Irish Rifles
- Lieutenant Edward Vere Slater, Royal Engineers
- Temp 2nd Lieutenant Stewart Beattie Slater, General List and Trench Mortar Battery
- Lieutenant Cuthbert Sleigh, Royal Engineers
- Lieutenant John Cotesworth Slessor, Royal Flying Corps
- Captain Herbert Douglas Smart, Royal Army Medical Corps
- Temp Captain Arthur Johnston Smith, Royal Engineers
- 2nd Lieutenant Alexander Francis Smith, Royal Field Artillery
- Temp Lieutenant Augustus Featonby Smith, Royal Field Artillery
- Sergeant Major Charles Smith, Leinster Regiment
- Lieutenant Desmond Abel Smith, Grenadier Guards, attached Machine Gun Company
- Temp Lieutenant Edward Thomas Smith, Liverpool Regiment
- 2nd Lieutenant George Stanley Edwin McGuiness Smith, North Staffordshire Regiment, attached Trench Mortar Battery
- Temp Lieutenant Herbert Leyland Smith, Royal Engineers
- Captain Ian Mackintosh Smith, Somerset Light Infantry
- Temp Captain James Rockcliffe Smith, King's Royal Rifle Corps
- Temp Captain Robert Arthur Smith, Royal Fusiliers
- Company Sergeant Major William Arthur Smith, Royal Irish Regiment
- 2nd Lieutenant Walter Campbell Smith, London Regiment
- 2nd Lieutenant George Richard Gore Smyth, Liverpool Regiment
- Temp Lieutenant Thomas Ralph Sneyd-Kinnersley, Royal Engineers
- Captain William McElrea Snodgrass, MB, Royal Army Medical Corps
- 2nd Lieutenant Ernest Henry Soar, Royal Fusiliers, attached Machine Gun Company
- Temp Captain Wilfred Newell Soden, MD, Royal Army Medical Corps
- Captain Ernest George Sotham, Manchester Regiment
- Captain Percy Gaisford Spackman, Royal Engineers
- Lieutenant Richard Wedgwood Sparrow, Hussars
- Honorary Lieutenant Gustave William Spears, Army Ordnance Depot
- Temp Captain Malcolm Scott Speir, Royal Engineers
- Lieutenant John Spence, Royal Engineers
- Temp Quartermaster and Honorary Lieutenant Harry Spencer, Royal Fusiliers
- Lieutenant Thomas Patrick Spens, Scottish Rifles
- 2nd Lieutenant Wilfrid James Maginnis Sproulle, West Riding Regiment, attached Machine Gun Company
- 2nd Lieutenant The Honourable Oliver Frederick George Stanley, Lancashire Hussars
- Company Sergeant Major Albert Charles Statham, Royal Engineers
- Lieutenant William Arthur Macdonald Stawell, Royal Engineers
- Temp Lieutenant Howard Stedman, Indian Army
- Temp Lieutenant Alexander Murray Stephen, Royal Garrison Artillery
- Sergeant Major George Alfred Stephens, Royal Garrison Artillery
- Lieutenant Talbert Stevenson, Royal Highlanders
- Temp Captain William Scott Stevenson, Argyll & Sutherland Highlanders
- 2nd Lieutenant George Robert William Stewart, General List, commanding Trench Mortar Battery
- Temp Lieutenant James Ernest Stewart, Royal Engineers
- Temp Captain John Ebenezer Stewart, Border Regiment
- Captain Colin Robert Hoste Stirling, Scottish Rifles
- Temp Lieutenant William Hewitt Stitt, Royal Irish Fusiliers
- Captain Arthur Edward Stokes-Roberts, Worcestershire Regiment
- Captain Alan Gething Stone, Gurkha Rifles, Indian Army
- Company Sergeant Major Frank Berry Stone, Royal Engineers
- Captain Robert Graham William Hawkins Stone, Royal Engineers
- 2nd Lieutenant Richard Boys Stones, Durham Light Infantry
- Captain Leonard Boole Stott, MB, Royal Army Medical Corps
- Lieutenant William Strachan, Royal Field Artillery
- 2nd Lieutenant Donald Strange, Border Regiment
- Temp 2nd Lieutenant Thomas Grainger Stewart, Royal Scots
- Captain The Honourable James Gray Stuart, Royal Scots
- Temp Captain William Grant Spruell Stuart, Cameron Highlanders
- Captain Malden Augustus Studd, Royal Field Artillery
- Temp 2nd Lieutenant William Edward Cedric Sturman, South Lancashire Regiment
- Temp Honorary Captain Claude Francis Denny Suggate, Army Ordnance Depot
- Captain Lional Randolph Coleridge Sumner, Gloucestershire Regiment
- Temp Lieutenant David Campbell Suttie, MB, Royal Army Medical Corps
- Captain Sir Richard Vincent Sutton, Bt, Life Guards
- 2nd Lieutenant Bertine Entwisle Sutton, Yeomanry, and Royal Flying Corps
- 2nd Lieutenant Desmond Sutton, London Regiment
- Temp Captain Geoffrey Storrs Sutton, Liverpool Regiment
- Captain Oliver Sutton-Nelthorpe, Rifle Brigade
- Captain Matthew Sykes, Royal Garrison Artillery
- Captain Samuel Stanley Sykes, West Yorkshire Regiment
- Temp Lieutenant Alexander Symons, Middlesex Regiment
- Temp Captain Gilbert George Symons, Cheshire Regiment
- 2nd Lieutenant Mark Winterbottom Tait, London Regiment, commanding Machine Gun Corps
- Sergeant Major Alfred Tapp, Royal West Kent Regiment
- 2nd Lieutenant Arthur Gerard Tapp, Royal Field Artillery
- Temp, Lieutenant Robert Bertram Tasker, Royal Engineers
- Lieutenant Darcy Edward Derrick Taylor, Royal Fusiliers
- Temp Lieutenant Eric Taylor, Royal Engineers
- Captain George Pritchard Taylor, MB, Royal Army Medical Corps
- Temp Lieutenant John Bentcliffe George Taylor, Rifle Brigade
- Quartermaster and Honorary Captain James Eccles Taylor, Highland Light Infantry
- Temp 2nd Lieutenant John George Taylor, Durham Light Infantry
- Temp 2nd Lieutenant Oscar Percy Taylor, General List, attached Trench Mortar Battery
- Captain Thomas Edgar Hugh Taylor, Royal Irish Regiment
- Temp Lieutenant Francis Lewis Tempest, Suffolk Regiment
- Captain George Temple, Royal Field Artillery
- Temp Lieutenant Charles Twynam Teychenne, Royal Garrison Artillery
- 2nd Lieutenant Noel Thacker, Gloucestershire Regiment, attached Trench Mortar Battery
- Captain Leslie Raymond Thoday, North Staffordshire Regiment
- Temp Captain John Gibb Thorn, Gordon Highlanders
- Lieutenant Albert Garnett Thomas, South Staffordshire Regiment
- Temp 2nd Lieutenant Benjamin Stewart Buckingham Thomas, Welsh Regiment
- Lieutenant Gwilym Ivor Thomas, Royal Field Artillery
- Temp 2nd Lieutenant George Vinson Thomas, East Yorkshire Regiment
- 2nd Lieutenant Lionel Beaumont Thomas, Royal Horse Artillery
- Captain Robert Clifford Lloyd Thomas, Monmouthshire Regiment
- Temp Captain Ronald Hawkesby Thomas, Royal Engineers
- Quartermaster and Honorary Lieutenant William Thomas, Royal Flying Corps
- Temp Captain William Geoffrey Thomas, Royal Welsh Fusiliers
- Temp 2nd Lieutenant Sidney Thompson, York & Lancaster Regiment, attached Machine Gun Company
- Captain George Thomson, Yorkshire Light Infantry
- Captain James Noel Thomson, Royal Artillery
- Temp Lieutenant Percy Arthur Henry Thorniley, Manchester Regiment
- 2nd Lieutenant Augustine Patrick Thornton, Royal Irish Rifles
- Temp Captain Francis Ruthven Thornton, Royal Army Medical Corps
- Lieutenant Thomas Thornton, York & Lancaster Regiment
- Lieutenant Roland Thorp, Royal Field Artillery Special Reserve
- Captain James Oliver Thurburn, Royal Artillery
- Lieutenant Arthur Cecil Ticehurst, Royal Engineers
- Captain Ord Henderson Tidbury, Middlesex Regiment
- Temp Captain Warwick Edward Tidy, Manchester Regiment
- Lieutenant Alexander Tillett, Devonshire Regiment
- Temp Lieutenant Stanley Day Timson, Royal Field Artillery
- Temp Lieutenant Charles Godfrey Tindall, Royal West Kent Regiment
- Captain William Tod, Royal Scots Fusiliers
- Captain Edward Devereux Hamilton Tollemache, Coldstream Guards
- Captain James Frederick Hugh Tomasson, Royal Artillery
- 2nd Lieutenant Geoffrey Stewart Tomkinson, Worcestershire Regiment
- Temp Captain Gerald Edward Guy Tooth, Leicestershire Regiment
- Temp Captain Gerald Franklin Torrey, General List
- Captain Rowland Henry Towell, Royal Field Artillery
- Captain Robert Beauchamp Tower, Nottinghamshire & Derbyshire Regiment
- Lieutenant John Walter Heath Toynbee, East Kent Regiment, attached Machine Gun Company
- Temp 2nd Lieutenant Harry Treacher, Royal Sussex Regiment
- Temp. Captain Harold Richard Tuppen, Royal Army Service Corps
- Company Sergeant Major Robert Turnbull, King's Own Scottish Borderers
- Lieutenant Arthur Brooke Turner, Royal Warwickshire Regiment
- Temp Captain Arthur Ward Turner, York & Lancaster Regiment
- Temp Lieutenant Henry Moore Turner, Cheshire Regiment
- 2nd Lieutenant John Turner, Royal Warwickshire Regiment
- 2nd Lieutenant Sydney Ward Turner, Suffolk Regiment
- Captain Algernon Corbet Turnor, Royal Horse Guards
- Temp Major Thomas Frederic Tweed, Lancashire Fusiliers
- Temp Lieutenant Cunningham Burnside Tweedie, King's Own Scottish Borderers
- Temp Lieutenant Cyril Douglas Twynam, Royal Engineers
- 2nd Lieutenant Frederick Tymms, South Lancashire Regiment
- Lieutenant Thomas Tyrwhitt-Drake, Oxfordshire & Buckinghamshire Light Infantry
- Lieutenant Charles Edward Tyson, Royal Field Artillery
- Temp 2nd Lieutenant John Hodgson Tyson, Royal Field Artillery
- Captain Lyndall Fownes Urwick, Worcestershire Regiment
- 2nd Lieutenant Silas Charles Richardson Usher, Royal Engineers
- Captain John Edward Utterson-Kelso, Royal Scots Fusiliers
- Lieutenant Henry Havelock d'Estamps Vallancey, Royal Field Artillery
- Honorary Captain Albert Robert Valon, Army Ordnance Depot
- Temp Lieutenant Stanley Charles Vickers, Royal Engineers
- Temp Lieutenant John Furse Bancroft Vidal, Royal Engineers
- Lieutenant Thomas Whitehair Vigers, Royal Engineers
- Captain William Bernard Vince, London Regiment
- Temp Lieutenant Gordon Philip Voss, Motor Machine Gun Corps
- Temp Captain Charles Douglas Waddell, General List, attached Trench Mortar Battery
- Temp Lieutenant Henry Charles Calderwood Walkem, Royal Engineers
- Captain George Croxton Walker, Royal Engineers
- Temp Captain Arthur Walker, West Yorkshire Regiment
- 2nd Lieutenant Jeffrey Walker, Royal Warwickshire Regiment
- Temp Lieutenant James Thomas Walker, Royal Garrison Artillery
- Captain William Keating Walker, Machine Gun Service
- Temp Captain Arthur Jewell Walkey, Royal Inniskilling Fusiliers
- Temp Lieutenant Henry Benedict Wall, Royal Engineers
- Lieutenant Archibald Lyle Wallace, Royal Field Artillery, attached Trench Mortar Battery
- Temp 2nd Lieutenant James Clarke Wallace, Royal Engineers
- Captain John Thornhill Wallace, Royal Horse Artillery, attached 8th Divisional Trench Mortar
- Temp Captain Herbert William Waller, Northumberland Fusiliers
- Temp Captain Percy Warbrick, Royal Engineers
- Lieutenant Richard Percyvale Ward, Royal Welsh Fusiliers
- Temp Captain Victor Ward Brown, General List
- Captain Mark Kingsley Wardle, Leicestershire Regiment
- Temp Lieutenant George MacDowell Warner, King's Royal Rifle Corps
- Rev. Wynyard Alexander Warner, Royal Army Chaplains' Department
- Temp Lieutenant John Warnock, Royal Engineers
- Captain William Robert Vaughton Warren, Army Service Corps
- 2nd Lieutenant Arthur Edward Wass, Hussars
- Captain George Guy Waterhouse, Royal Engineers
- Captain Michael Theodore Waterhouse, Yeomanry
- 2nd Lieutenant Horace Frank Waters, London Regiment
- Temp 2nd Lieutenant William Clifford Watkin, Royal Engineers
- Captain Forrester Colvin Watson, Hussars
- Captain Frank Leslie Watson, West Yorkshire Regiment
- 2nd Lieutenant Joseph Herbert Watson, Royal Engineers
- Captain Thomas Hovenden Watson, Worcestershire Regiment
- 2nd Lieutenant James Watt, King's Own Scottish Borderers
- Acting Regimental Sergeant Major Albert Watts, North Lancashire Regiment
- Temp Lieutenant Robert Watts, Army Service Corps
- Temp Captain Thomas Hall Waugh, Northumberland Fusiliers
- 2nd Lieutenant George Sholto Ripley Webb, Royal Berkshire Regiment, attached Trench Mortar Battery
- Temp Captain Maurice Everett Webb, Royal Engineers
- Temp Captain Noel William Webb, Royal Flying Corps
- Lieutenant Percy Lovell Webb, London Regiment
- Temp Lieutenant Basil Courtenay Victor Weeks, Royal Marines
- Lieutenant Ronald Morce Weeks, South Lancashire Regiment
- Captain John Francis Jessop Weiss, Royal Berkshire Regiment
- Temp Captain Ronald Sidney Panton Wells, Royal Field Artillery
- Lieutenant Thomas Clinton Wells, Welsh Regiment
- Temp Captain Percy B. Welton, Royal Welsh Fusiliers
- Lieutenant Edward Wenham, Kings Royal Rifle Corps
- Temp Captain Reginald Francis West, General List
- Temp Captain George Cecil Westbrook Westbrooke, Royal Welsh Fusiliers
- Temp Lieutenant Harry Westwood, Royal Engineers
- 2nd Lieutenant Ralph Gates Wever, Royal Engineers
- Captain Arthur Weyman, Leicestershire Regiment
- Temp 2nd Lieutenant John Wharton, South Staffordshire Regiment
- Temp Captain Ellis George Whately, Hertfordshire Regiment
- Lieutenant John Ben Wheater, Army Service Corps
- 2nd Lieutenant Bertram Seymour Whidborne, Royal Field Artillery, attached Trench Mortar Battery
- Rev. Richard Whincup, MA, Royal Army Chaplains' Department
- Temp Captain Henry Whittaker, Royal Engineers
- 2nd Lieutenant John Tudor Whitaker, Army Service Corps and Royal Flying Corps
- Lieutenant Cecil William Keane White, Royal Horse Artillery
- Temp 2nd Lieutenant Noel Blanco White, General List
- Temp Lieutenant William White, Highland Light Infantry
- 2nd Lieutenant Bernard Whiteman, Royal Sussex Regiment
- Temp Captain Brian William Wibberley, MB, Royal Army Medical Corps
- 2nd Lieutenant Henry William Wiebkin, Royal Artillery
- Temp 2nd Lieutenant Henry Wild, Northumberland Fusiliers
- Temp Lieutenant George Thomas Wilkes, East Surrey Regiment
- Lieutenant Cyril Francis Wilkins, Royal Irish Rifles
- 2nd Lieutenant Thomas Wilkins, Royal Field Artillery
- 2nd Lieutenant Alfred Wilkinson, Durham Light Infantry, commanding Trench Mortar Battery
- 2nd Lieutenant Louis John Austin Will, Worcestershire Regiment
- 2nd Lieutenant Harry Willans, Bedfordshire Regiment
- Temp Captain David Llewelyn Williams, Royal Army Medical Corps
- Honorary Lieutenant and Temp Captain Gerard William Williams, Royal Engineers
- Battery Sergeant Major Henry Alfred Williams, Royal Artillery
- Captain Arthur Reginald Williamson, Durham Light Infantry
- Captain Maurice Joseph Williamson, Royal Army Medical Corps
- Temp Lieutenant Thomas Roy Williamson, Royal Fusiliers
- Temp Lieutenant William Henry Rowe Williamson, Army Service Corps
- Lieutenant Henry Urmston Willink, Royal Field Artillery
- Temp Captain Harvey Thew Willmer, Liverpool Regiment
- Temp Captain Bassett FitzGerald Wilson, General List
- Temp Captain Edward Arthur Wilson, Royal Engineers
- Temp Captain Frederick Gordon Wilson, Northumberland Fusiliers
- Temp Captain Gavin Laurie Wilson, Argyll & Sutherland Highlanders
- Temp Captain Ivan Stuart Wilson, MD, FRCS, Royal Army Medical Corps
- Temp Captain John Wolseley Wilson, Gloucestershire Regiment
- Captain Percy Norton Whitestone Wilson, Royal Fusiliers
- Captain Francis William Wilson-Fitzgerald, Dragoons
- Temp 2nd Lieutenant Charles William Winkley, Machine Gun Corps
- Temp Captain Ernest Arthur Winter, Royal Fusiliers
- Temp 2nd Lieutenant Charles Edward Witcomb, Gloucestershire Regiment
- Captain Frank Hole Witts, Irish Guards
- Captain Robert Wolrige-Gordon, Grenadier Guards
- Lieutenant Alexander Lyttleton Wood, South Staffordshire Regiment
- Captain John Hutchinson Wood, MB, Royal Army Medical Corps
- Captain Edward Ambrose Woods, Royal Field Artillery
- Lieutenant James Woods, Royal Field Artillery
- Temp 2nd Lieutenant Hubert Worsley Woolley, Royal Field Artillery
- Lieutenant Albert Edward Worrall, King's Own Scottish Borderers
- Captain Hugh Gildart Worsley, Royal Field Artillery
- Temp Captain Thomas Ryland Worthington, Manchester Regiment
- Captain Walter Gustavus Worthington, London Regiment
- Temp Lieutenant Sidney Murray Wren, Royal Engineers
- Temp Captain Joseph Herbert Wright, Gloucestershire Regiment
- Rev. J. Jackson Wright, Royal Army Chaplains' Department
- 2nd Lieutenant Philip Lowndes Wright, Oxfordshire & Buckinghamshire Light Infantry
- Temp 2nd Lieutenant Sidney George Wright, Royal West Kent Regiment
- Captain Francis Piers Wye, Royal Field Artillery
- Lieutenant Philip Herbert Wykeham, Royal Artillery
- Lieutenant Jasper William George Wyld, Oxfordshire & Buckinghamshire Light Infantry
- Temp Captain Robert Meredydd Wynne-Edwards, Royal Welsh Fusiliers
- Lieutenant Victor Alexander Campbell Yate, Durham Light Infantry
- Quartermaster and Honorary Major Alexander Preston Yeadon, Cameron Highlanders
- Temp Lieutenant Oliver Kinnard York, Gloucestershire Regiment
- Company Sergeant Major Charles Percy Young, Middlesex Regiment
- Temp 2nd Lieutenant Hugh Young, Royal Inniskilling Fusiliers
- Temp Captain John Miller Young, MB, Royal Army Medical Corps
- Lieutenant Keith de Lorentz Young, Indian Army
- Temp Lieutenant Henry Waldo Yoxall, King's Royal Rifle Corps
- Temp Lieutenant Nelson Zambra, Royal Artillery

Australian Imperial Force

- Lieutenant Robert Clegg Åland, Infantry Battalion
- Captain Harold Mathieson Beiers, Infantry Battalion
- Captain James Bentley, Army Medical Corps
- Captain John Bright Birch, Army Medical Corps
- Captain Arthur Richard Blainey, Infantry Battalion
- Lieutenant Charles Adrian Boccard, Infantry Battalion
- Captain William Bridgeford, Machine Gun Company
- Captain Horace Clowes Brinsmead, Infantry Battalion
- Lieutenant Arnold Brown, Infantry Battalion
- Lieutenant Harcourt Earl Douglas Brown, Trench Mortar Battery, Field Artillery
- Lieutenant John Leslie Gibson Buckland, Engineers
- Lieutenant Reginald Clive Callister, Machine Gun Corps
- Captain Henry Gervais Lovatt Cameron, Infantry Battalion
- Captain Gordon Cathcart Campbell, Infantry Battalion, attached Machine Gun Section
- Lieutenant Harrison McDowell Campbell, Infantry Battalion
- Captain Richard Gardiner Casey, Volunteer Automobile Corps
- Lieutenant Launcelet Arthur Cleveland, Field Artillery
- Lieutenant Cyril Albert Clowes, Field Artillery
- Captain Norman Clowes, Headquarters, Artillery
- Captain Frederick Lawrence Coldwell-Smith, Infantry Battalion
- Captain Arthur Edmund Colvin, Army Medical Corps
- Lieutenant Guy Kennedy Davenport, Field Artillery Brigade
- Captain William McIntyre Davis, Infantry Battalion
- Captain Arthur William Dodd, Field Artillery
- Captain Francis Henry Dunn, Infantry Battalion
- Lieutenant Walter Edmund Swan Edgar, Infantry Battalion
- Lieutenant Thomas Arthur Fairfax, Infantry Battalion
- Lieutenant James Joseph Fay, Infantry Battalion
- Lieutenant Ernest John Ferguson, Artillery, attached Trench Mortar Battery
- Captain William Reginald Rogers Ffrench, Machine Gun Company
- Captain Eric Mortley Fisher, Army Medical Corps
- Sergeant Major Albert Henry Percy Fleming, Infantry Battalion
- Captain Alexander Moore Forbes, Field Artillery
- Captain Frederick Edward Forrest, Artillery
- Captain Walter Fowler-Brownsworth, Army Service Corps
- Captain Richard Allen Geddes, Infantry Battalion
- Rev. Patrick James Gilbert, Royal Army Chaplains' Department
- Rev. Edward O'Sullivan Goidanich, Royal Army Chaplains' Department
- Captain John MacDonald Grant, Engineers
- Captain Charles Berry Grieve, Army Service Corps
- Captain Charles Guilfoyle, Infantry Battalion
- 2nd Lieutenant Walter Rieve Hallahan, Infantry Battalion
- Major Norman Charles Harris, Engineers
- Captain Charles Henry Harrison, Infantry Battalion
- Captain the Rev. Joseph Hearn, Royal Army Chaplains' Department
- Lieutenant William Frederick Hinman, Infantry Battalion
- Captain Frederick Brock Hinton, Light Horse Regiment, attached Machine Gun Company
- Captain Arnold Kingsley Hosking, Infantry Battalion
- Major William Inglis, Infantry Battalion
- Captain Walter William James, Engineers
- Captain John Thomas Jones, Army Medical Corps
- Captain Harold Reginald Koch, Infantry Battalion
- Lieutenant Elmer Winfred Drake Laing, Infantry Battalion
- Captain John Henry McElroy, Infantry Battalion
- Captain George Stanley McIlroy, Infantry Battalion
- Captain Donald Alexander McNab, Infantry Battalion, attached Trench Mortar Battery
- Captain Mafra William McVeau, Infantry Battalion
- Captain Douglas Gray Marks, Infantry Battalion
- Captain Gordon Louis Maxfield, Infantry Battalion
- Captain Charles Beverley Metcalfe, Army Medical Corps
- Lieutenant Christopher Kenneth Millar, Infantry Battalion
- Captain Thomas George Millner, Army Service Corps
- Captain Clarence Frank Mills, Australian Engineers
- Captain Keith Officer, Light Horse Brigade
- Captain Lowell Thomas Oscar Pedler, Pioneer Battalion
- Sergeant Major William John Phillips, Field Artillery
- Lieutenant William Elmhurst Potts, Engineers
- Captain Hugh Dougas Pulling, Infantry Battalion
- Lieutenant Cyril George Ross, Infantry Battalion
- Captain William Henry Sanday, Pioneer Battalion
- Captain James Edmund Savage, Army Service Corps
- Captain Edgar Geoffrey Sawer, Infantry Battalion, attached Machine Gun Company
- Lieutenant William Charles Scurry, Infantry Battalion, attached Trench Mortar Battery
- Captain Ivan Brunker Sherbon, Infantry Battalion
- Captain George Douglas Smith, Headquarters
- Captain Carl Speckman, Pioneer Battalion
- Captain Geoffrey Lewis Strachan, Field Artillery
- Captain David Thomson, Infantry Battalion
- Captain Harold Edward Townsend, Pioneer Battalion
- Captain Charles George Walklate, Infantry Battalion
- Lieutenant Albert Edward Wallis, Artillery, attached Trench Mortar Battery
- 2nd Lieutenant Herbert Fraser Watson, Infantry Battalion
- Captain Stanley Holm Watson, Engineers
- Captain Albert Ernest Wearne, Light Horse Regiment, Australian Imperial Force
- Captain Eric Norman Webb, Engineers
- Lieutenant Ernest Leslie Wilcock, Infantry Battalion
- Major Aubrey Roy Liddon Wiltshire, Infantry Battalion
- Captain Percy William Woods, Infantry
- Lieutenant Hugh Wrigley, Infantry Battalion
- 2nd Lieutenant Charles Frederick Yeadon, Infantry Battalion

Canadian Forces

- Captain William Douglas Adams, Infantry Battalion
- Captain Douglass Harvey Barnett, Infantry Battalion
- Lieutenant Harold Grafton Barnum, Infantry Battalion
- Lieutenant Charles Austin Bell, Engineers
- Captain John Kay Beveridge, Infantry Battalion
- Lieutenant Percy Vere Binns, Engineers
- Captain George Howard Bradbrooke, Mounted Rifles Battalion
- Lieutenant Frederick Archibald Brewster, Canadian Engineers
- Captain Alexander Douglas Cameron, Lord Strathcona's Horse
- Captain Alue Edward Cameron, Royal Army Veterinary Corps
- Captain John Forin Campbell, Pioneer Battalion
- Lieutenant John Robert Cartwright, Infantry Battalion
- Captain Dameral Aubrey Clarke, Princess Patricia's Canadian Light Infantry
- Temp Lieutenant Roger Fyfe Clarke, Canadian Engineers
- Lieutenant Cuthbert Peart Coatsworth, Pioneer Battalion
- Captain Percy Edward Colman, Mounted Rifles Battalion
- Company Sergeant Major James Collett, Infantry Battalion
- Lieutenant Graham Cruickshank, Mounted Rifles Battalion
- Captain Herbert McMillan Dawson, Cavalry Regiment
- Captain James Arnold Delancey, Infantry Battalion
- Lieutenant Duncan Fraser Dewar, Engineers
- Captain Angus Alexander Drinnan, Army Medical Corps
- Lieutenant Robert Lionel Dunsmore, Engineers
- Captain Alfred Eastham, Machine Gun Service
- Lieutenant Harold Lee Fetherstonhaugh, Field Artillery
- Sergeant Major Edward Eleazar Frost, Pioneer Battalion
- Temp Honorary Major Rev. Alexander MacLennan Gordon, Royal Army Chaplains' Department
- Lieutenant Oswald Wetherald Grant, Infantry Battalion
- Captain The Honourable Francis Egerton Grosvenor, Infantry Battalion
- Captain Ralph Price Harding, Field Artillery
- Lieutenant John Percival Harvey, Engineers
- Captain Charles Francis Hawkins, Machine Gun Service
- Captain Patrick Hennessy, Army Service Corps
- Captain Harry Edmund Hodge, Infantry Battalion, attached Machine Gun Company
- Lieutenant James Parker Hooper, General List
- Captain Eugene Harvey Houghton, Infantry Battalion, attached Machine Gun Company
- Captain Cyrus Fiske Inches, Artillery
- Lieutenant Frank Edward Harte Johnson, Army Service Corps
- Sergeant Major Thomas Fred Jordan, Infantry Battalion
- Lieutenant William Harold Kippen, Infantry Battalion
- Lieutenant Clarence Lea, Mounted Rifles Battalion
- Captain Allan Leavitt, Engineers
- Captain Frederick William Lees, Army Medical Corps
- Lieutenant James Hubert Leeson, Engineers
- Captain Robert Marsden Luton, Army Medical Corps
- Captain James Ernest McAskill, Army Medical Corps
- Lieutenant Angus Gillis Macauley, Canadian Engineers
- Captain George Cross McDonald, Princess Patricia's Canadian Light Infantry
- Lieutenant Donald Henry Macfarlane, Engineers
- Lieutenant Malcolm MacAdam McGregor, Infantry Battalion
- Captain David Livingstone McKeand, Infantry Battalion
- Lieutenant Francis Harold McLorg, Infantry Battalion
- Lieutenant John Barkley Mason, Engineers
- Captain Herbert Molson, Infantry Battalion
- Captain Percival John Montague, Infantry Battalion, Deputy Assistant Adjutant General, Headquarters
- Major Lafayette Harry Nelles, Infantry Battalion
- Lieutenant Francis Philip Douglas Newland, Infantry Battalion
- Captain William Freeman Nicholson, Army Medical Corps
- Lieutenant George Waller de Courcy O'Grady, Infantry Battalion
- Lieutenant George Paterson, Infantry Battalion
- Lieutenant Harry Bronghall Pepler, Infantry Battalion
- Lieutenant Harold Phillips, Royal Canadian Regiment
- Captain Paul Poisson, Army Medical Corps
- Captain Charles Frederick Clauston Porteous, Divisional Headquarters
- Captain Raymond Pouncey, Infantry Battalion, attached Trench Mortar Battery
- Lieutenant Charles G. Power, Infantry Battalion
- Captain George Purves, Infantry Battalion
- Temp Captain Alan Bruce Ritchie, Canadian Engineers
- Lieutenant John Hamilton Roberts, Royal Horse Artillery
- Lieutenant Andrew Murray Robertson, Engineers
- Captain George Ross Robertson, Infantry Battalion
- Captain Walford Douglas Somerled Rorison, Army Medical Corps
- Captain Percy Guy Routh, Mounted Infantry Battalion
- Lieutenant Hugh Millar Rowe, Pioneer Battalion
- Captain Edward James Carson Schmidlin, Headquarters, Divisional Engineers
- Lieutenant John Westry Stagg, Infantry Battalion
- Lieutenant Richard Winslow Stayner, Mounted Rifles Battalion
- Captain Douglas Hinch Storms, Field Artillery
- Captain Kenneth Stuart, Engineers
- Captain Thomas Alexander Hatch Taylor, Infantry Battalion, attached Machine Gun Company
- Captain Robert Grant Thackray, Divisional Artillery Headquarters
- Lieutenant Gilbert Tyndale-Lea, Field Artillery
- Captain Lawrence Bertram Unwin, Infantry Battalion
- Captain Hugh McIntyre Urquhart, Infantry Battalion
- Captain Francis Alfred Wilkin, Motor Machine Gun Brigade
- Lieutenant Frank Scott Winser, Infantry Battalion
- Captain Richard Worrall, Infantry Battalion
- Lieutenant Ernest James Young, Engineers

Egyptian Army

- El Saghkolaghasi Mahmud Bahgat (Effendi), S.O. to Camel Corps
- El Saghkolaghasi Mahmud Hafez (Effendi), Staff
- El Saghkolaghasi Mohammed Hassan (Effendi), Military Works Department
- El Saghkolaghasi Mohammed Niazi (Effendi), Cavalry
- El Yuzbashi Ali Islam (Effendi), Artillery
- El Yuzbashi El Sayed Ferid (Effendi), Department of Stores
- El Yuzbashi Hussein Taher (Effendi), Arab Battalion
- El Yuzbashi Mabruk Fiki (Effendi), Sudanese
- El Yuzbashi Mahmud Shukri (Effendi), Sudanese
- El Yuzbashi Musa Khouri Zakharia (Effendi), Medical Corps
- El Yuzbashi Nasralla El Burgi (Effendi), Medical Corps
- El Mulazim Awal Abdulla Adam Gabril (Effendi), Camel Corps
- El Mulazim Awal Ahmed Ibrahim (Effendi)
- El Mulazim Awal Azab Selim (Effendi)
- El Mulazim Awal Mohammed Talat (Effendi), Veterinary Department
- El Mulazim, Awal Mohammed Yuzri (Effendi), Artillery
- El Mulazim Awal Shaker Mansur El Rubi (Effendi)
- El Mulazim, Tahi Suleiman Omar (Effendi)
- El Mulazim Tahi Zeki Ali Ghonaim (Effendi)

Newfoundland Contingent

- Captain Arthur Raley, Newfoundland Regiment
- Captain Reginald Rowsell, Newfoundland Regiment

New Zealand Imperial Force

- 2nd Lieutenant Leonard Stewart Carmichael, Field Artillery
- Captain Donald Dobson, Canterbury Regiment
- Lieutenant Alexander Smith Falconer, Otago Regiment
- 2nd Lieutenant Stanley Gordon Guthrie, Wellington Regiment
- Lieutenant Turu Hiroti, Pioneer Battalion
- Captain Alfred Ernest Horwood, Field Artillery
- Captain Lindsay Merritt Inglis, Machine Gun Company, Rifle Brigade
- Captain Leonard Handforth Jardine, Wellington Battalion
- Captain Charles Victor Leeming, Field Artillery
- Lieutenant Hugh Edgar McKinnon, Wellington Battalion
- Captain Robert Stirrat Macquarrie, Field Artillery
- Captain John Llewellyn Charles Merton, Canterbury Regiment
- Captain Reginald Miles, Field Artillery
- Captain Robert Nicoll Morpeth, Auckland Regiment
- Captain Harry McKellar White Richardson, Staff Corps
- Honorary Captain George Sandham, Army Medical Corps
- Captain James Garfield Stewart, Army Service Corps
- Captain Alan Duncan Stitt, Canterbury Regiment
- Lieutenant William Francis Tracey, Otago Regiment
- Lieutenant Stanley Hugh William Widdowson, Otago Regiment, attached Trench Mortar Battery
- Captain William George Wray, Otago Regiment

South African Forces

- Captain and Adjutant Harry William Morrey Bamford, Infantry
- Captain and Adjutant Claude Melville Browne, Infantry Battalion
- 2nd Lieutenant Garnet George Green, Infantry Battalion
- Captain Rev. Eustace St Clair Hill, South African Chaplains' Department
- Lieutenant Robert Poole, Signal Company, Engineers
- Lieutenant Finlay Mack Ross, Signal Company, Engineers
- Lieutenant John Lindsay Shenton, Infantry Battalion
- Captain Sydney Wallis Elliot Style, Infantry Battalion

In recognition of their gallantry and devotion to duty in the Field

- Captain Charles Looker Awbery, Essex Regiment, attached Cambridgeshire Regiment. For conspicuous gallantry in action. He led his company direct to the final objective, and got into touch with the battalions on his right and left, sending his report to battalion headquarters. He carried out a difficult operation with great courage and skill.
- Temp Lieutenant William Greville Bain, Royal Field Artillery. For conspicuous gallantry in action. He displayed great courage and determination when acting as Forward Observation Officer. On another occasion he commanded his battery with great skill and himself rescued several wounded men under fire.
- Temp Captain Ian Alexander Baxter, Royal Welsh Fusiliers. For conspicuous gallantry in action. He displayed great coolness and courage in reorganising the front line under heavy fire. He set a splendid example throughout.
- Temp Sub-Lieutenant Daniel Marcus William Beak, Royal Naval Volunteer Reserve. For conspicuous gallantry in action. He led his men in the attack with great courage and initiative and materially assisted in the capture of the enemy line. He set a fine example throughout.
- 2nd Lieutenant George Arthur Oswald Berridge, Royal Field Artillery. For conspicuous gallantry in action. He carried a wounded orderly to a place of safety under heavy fire. On another occasion he remained out with a wounded officer until dark and then brought him to our lines.
- 2nd Lieutenant Bertram Okeden Bircham, Hampshire Regiment. For conspicuous gallantry in action. He organised his own and another company under heavy fire and reinforced the attacking line at a critical time. He set a splendid example of courage and coolness throughout.
- 2nd Lieutenant James Arthur Blackey, Royal Field Artillery. For conspicuous gallantry in action. He displayed great courage and skill when observing under very heavy fire, and sent back most valuable information. Later, he carried a wounded man over the open into safety.
- Temp Lieutenant Leonard Mark Blomenstock, Royal Field Artillery. For conspicuous gallantry in action. He displayed great courage and determination when observing for his battery, thereby being chiefly responsible that the enemy's wire was well cut. He has at all times set a splendid example.
- Temp 2nd Lieutenant Edmund Charles Blunden, Royal Sussex Regiment. For conspicuous gallantry in action. He displayed great courage and determination when in charge of a carrying party under heavy fire. He has previously done fine work.
- Temp Sub-Lieutenant Boyden Frank Bowerman, Royal Naval Volunteer Reserve. For conspicuous gallantry in action. He rallied considerable numbers of men and led them forward under heavy fire. He set a splendid example of courage and coolness throughout.
- Temp 2nd Lieutenant Vernon Bowmer, Nottinghamshire & Derbyshire Regiment. For conspicuous gallantry in action. He led his platoon with great dash and showed marked initiative and ability. He organised bombing parties and accounted for a large number of Germans.
- Temp 2nd Lieutenant Arthur Herbert Britten, Gloucestershire Regiment. For conspicuous gallantry in action. He displayed great courage and ability when in charge of the newly captured front, and greatly assisted in the organisation and defence of the line. He set a fine example throughout.
- Captain George Macdonald Brown, Hertfordshire Regiment. For conspicuous gallantry in action. Grasping the situation and taking on his duties as Brigade Major at a critical time, he carried out invaluable work and showed marked courage and ability.
- 2nd Lieutenant Francis Alfred Cook, York & Lancaster Regiment. For conspicuous gallantry in action. He carried out a dangerous reconnaissance under heavy fire, and obtained most valuable information. Later, he assisted to rescue a wounded man.
- Temp Lieutenant Roger Coughtrie, Royal Garrison Artillery. For conspicuous gallantry in action. He rescued under heavy fire several men who had been buried in a dug-out. On another occasion he displayed great courage and determination in keeping his guns in action under the most trying conditions.
- Temp 2nd Lieutenant John Francis Cox, Royal Dublin Fusiliers. For conspicuous gallantry in action. He organised a bombing party and led them forward against a strong point, shooting three enemy snipers with his own hand. He set a fine example of courage and coolness throughout. He was wounded.
- Temp Lieutenant Ronald Fairbridge Currey, Argyll & Sutherland Highlanders, attached Royal Highlanders. For conspicuous gallantry in action. He carried out several valuable reconnaissances prior to the attack. Later, he carried out a daring reconnaissance under heavy fire and obtained most valuable information.
- Temp Lieutenant Bernard Dangerfield, Royal Naval Volunteer Reserve. For conspicuous gallantry in action. He established and maintained communication under very heavy fire. Later, he carried out a dangerous reconnaissance and led a considerable number of men forward who were held up.
- 2nd Lieutenant Terence Downing, Royal Fusiliers. For conspicuous gallantry in action. Although wounded, he crawled back to report the situation, and then returned and withdrew his company without loss under cover of dusk. He set a fine example throughout.
- Captain Charles Hertel Egerton, Royal Engineers. For conspicuous gallantry in action. He displayed marked energy and courage, and by his example encouraged his men in their work of clearing a road under heavy fire. He carried out a valuable reconnaissance.
- Temp Lieutenant Edward Vezian Ellis, Royal Naval Volunteer Reserve. For conspicuous gallantry in action. He led a counter bombing attack down the enemy second line trench, which had been only partially occupied by our troops, and was instrumental in capturing a number of prisoners.
- Lieutenant Daniel Davies Evans, Royal Army Medical Corps, attached Royal Dublin Fusiliers. For conspicuous gallantry and devotion to, duty. He displayed great courage and determination in collecting, and attending to the wounded tinder very heavy fire.
- Temp Captain Rupert Farrant, FRCS, Royal Army Medical Corps, attached Shropshire Light Infantry. For conspicuous gallantry and devotion to duty. During the whole day he tended wounded in an open trench which was subjected to a violent bombardment. On one occasion he led a party into "No Man's Land" and brought in several wounded men.
- 2nd Lieutenant Lionel Robert D'Arcy Fisher, Hertfordshire Regiment. For conspicuous gallantry in action. He led his platoon in the attack with great gallantry and captured his objective. Later, he rendered most valuable services during the consolidation of the position.
- Captain Richard Nagle Ford, Royal Fusiliers. For conspicuous gallantry in action. He twice went out under very heavy fire to ascertain the situation, thereby rendering most valuable assistance at a critical time. He set a fine example throughout.
- Temp Sub-Lieutenant Frank Oliver Forrester, Royal Naval Volunteer Reserve. For conspicuous gallantry in action. He led a party of 20 men into an enemy trench with great gallantry and captured 129 prisoners. He set a fine example of courage and coolness.
- Captain John Forster, Royal Fusiliers. For conspicuous gallantry in action. He led a raid against the enemy's trenches with great courage and skill. Later, he showed great presence of mind under heavy fire, thereby enabling the right flank to advance.
- Captain Russell Herbert Freeman, Worcestershire Regiment, and Royal Flying Corps. For conspicuous gallantry in action. He attacked and drove off an enemy aeroplane which had forced one of our machines to land. Later, he landed and rescued the pilot under very difficult conditions. He set a fine example of courage and initiative.
- 2nd Lieutenant Antonio Marie Gallo, Bedfordshire Regiment, attached Hertfordshire Regiment. For conspicuous gallantry in action. He assumed command of and led his company in the attack with great gallantry, captured his objective, and consolidated the position. Later, he repulsed an enemy attack. He set a fine example throughout.
- 2nd Lieutenant George Harold Yates Gilbey, Hertfordshire Regiment. For conspicuous gallantry in action. He carried out several daring reconnaissances under fire previous to the attack. Later, he rendered most valuable assistance in assembling the battalion in an extremely difficult area.
- Temp 2nd Lieutenant Henry Hastings Goldney, Royal Engineers. For conspicuous gallantry in action. He displayed great courage and skill in marking out assembly positions under very heavy fire, thereby materially assisting in the success of the operations.
- Rev. Percy Hallding, Royal Navy, Royal Army Chaplains' Department. For conspicuous gallantry and devotion to duty. He displayed great courage and determination in attending to the wounded under heavy fire. On one occasion he carried a wounded officer from the open into safety.
- Temp Captain Frank Anthony Hampton, MB, Royal Army Medical Corps, attached Royal Scots. For conspicuous gallantry and devotion to duty. He continually went out under very heavy fire and remained in the open attending to the wounded with the utmost bravery and coolness. He has previously done fine work.
- Temp Sub-Lieutenant Walter Kilroy Harris, Royal Naval Volunteer Reserve. For conspicuous gallantry in action. He led a raid against an enemy machine gun with great gallantry, capturing the gun and turning it on the enemy. Later, he led a small bombing party and was instrumental in capturing 102 prisoners.
- 2nd Lieutenant Frederick Reginald Hart, Hertfordshire Regiment. For conspicuous gallantry in action. He led his company in the attack with great courage and initiative, and captured his objective. He has previously done fine work. He was severely wounded.
- Temp 2nd Lieutenant Arthur Lancelot Holland, Nottinghamshire & Derbyshire Regiment. For conspicuous gallantry in action. He led his company in the attack with great courage and initiative, capturing an enemy battalion commander and his staff. He set a fine example throughout.
- Temp 2nd Lieutenant Donald Henry Holley, Royal Engineers. For conspicuous gallantry in action. He showed exceptional courage and resource in consolidating the captured position under heavy fire. He has at all times set a fine example.
- 2nd Lieutenant Thomas Howarth, Lancashire Fusiliers. For conspicuous gallantry in action. On several occasions he displayed great courage and determination in getting stores up to the front line under heavy fire. He set a splendid example throughout the operations.
- Temp Lieutenant Robert Leslie Illingworth, Nottinghamshire & Derbyshire Regiment. For conspicuous gallantry in action. He led his company in the attack with great courage and determination. Later, he, accompanied only by his orderly, captured 81 prisoners.
- 2nd Lieutenant Herbert Horace Johnson, East Lancashire Regiment. For conspicuous gallantry in action. He carried out a most valuable reconnaissance, thereby enabling his company to reach their objective. On another occasion he led his company in the attack with great courage and determination.
- Temp 2nd Lieutenant Raymond Albert Johnson, Nottinghamshire & Derbyshire Regiment. For conspicuous gallantry in action. He led his men in the attack with great courage and determination. He set a splendid example throughout the operations.
- 2nd Lieutenant John Rodney Johnston, East Surrey Regiment, attached Hertfordshire Regiment. For conspicuous gallantry in action. He entered an enemy dug-out and, single-handed, captured one officer and 45 men. Later, he carried out a daring reconnaissance and obtained most valuable information. He set a fine example throughout.
- 2nd Lieutenant Herbert Edward Reid Jones, Royal Scots. For conspicuous gallantry in action. He displayed great courage and initiative in the handling of a working party when attacked by a strong party of the enemy. He has previously done fine work.
- 2nd Lieutenant Colin Keith-Johnston, Bedfordshire Regiment. For conspicuous gallantry in action. He rallied men of several units, led them forward, and captured many prisoners. He continued at duty until relieved, although wounded three times.
- Temp Lieutenant William Hubert Kirby, Royal Engineers. For conspicuous gallantry in action. He displayed great courage and determination when constructing a communication trench under heavy fire. Later, he conducted many parties of officers to the assembly points, and by his coolness in these operations materially assisted in the success of the attack.
- 2nd Lieutenant Clyde Erskine Lanham, Royal Field Artillery. For conspicuous gallantry in action. He displayed great courage and determination when acting as Forward Observation Officer. and repeatedly carried messages through an intense enemy barrage.
- Temp Captain John Samuel Levis, MB, Royal Army Medical Corps. For conspicuous gallantry and devotion to duty. He displayed great courage and determination when in charge of stretcher-bearers under heavy fire. He has on many previous occasions done fine work.
- Temp Lieutenant John Richard Wardell Linton, Army Service Corps. For conspicuous gallantry in action. When the Siege Artillery Park was being heavily shelled, with great coolness and initiative he organised the working parties to clear the vehicles in the yard and the contents of the workshops to a place of safety.
- Temp Captain Francis Cromby Macaulay, MB, Royal Army Medical Corps. For conspicuous gallantry and devotion to duty. He displayed great courage and determination in collecting and attending to wounded under very heavy fire.
- Temp Lieutenant James McLaren Marshall, Royal Garrison Artillery. For conspicuous gallantry in action. He rescued and carried a wounded man to safety under very heavy fire. On two other occasions he displayed great courage and devotion to duty by rescuing men under heavy fire.
- 2nd Lieutenant Charles Sloan McCririck, Royal Highlanders. For conspicuous gallantry in action. He led his men in the attack with great courage and determination, capturing his objective. He was severely wounded.
- 2nd Lieutenant George Thomas McGill, Royal Scots. For conspicuous gallantry in action. He reorganised a firing line and led it forward again in a second attempt to get through very thick wire. Later, he established and held a line within 50 yards of the enemy's trenches.
- Temp 2nd Lieutenant Vincent Matthew McMahon, Royal Dublin Fusiliers. For conspicuous gallantry in action. He led a bombing party against machine guns holding up the advance. He succeeded in knocking out two machine guns and allowed the advance to continue. He was wounded.
- Temp 2nd Lieutenant Herbert Marsh Sims Meares, Royal Engineers. For conspicuous gallantry in action. He took command of a section of his company, in addition to his own, and by his example and encouragement kept his men working under very heavy fire.
- Temp Sub-Lieutenant Albert Paul Mecklenburg, Royal Naval Volunteer Reserve. For conspicuous gallantry in action. Although twice wounded, he rallied his men close in front of a strongly held enemy position, and, charging right through, broke up all opposition and reached his correct objective.
- Lieutenant Frank Melhuish Merson, Honourable Artillery Company. For conspicuous gallantry in action. On two occasions he displayed great courage and skill in fighting his machine guns under very heavy fire. He set a fine example throughout.
- Lieutenant John Murray, Royal Highlanders. For conspicuous gallantry in action. He displayed great courage and initiative in reorganising his company under very heavy fire. He previously carried out several valuable reconnaissances under fire.
- 2nd Lieutenant Frank Naden, Cheshire Regiment. For conspicuous gallantry in action. He reorganised two companies and sent them forward to the final objective, thereby clear-up the situation at a critical time. He set a splendid example of coolness and courage.
- Temp 2nd Lieutenant James Eliot Norton, Royal Field Artillery. For conspicuous gallantry in action. He continued to pass the orders to two isolated sections after telephonic communication had been broken down, thereby enabling three guns to be kept in action. On another occasion he kept his battery in action under very heavy fire, and set a fine example to his men.
- Temp Lieutenant Clive Edward Effingham Pargeter, Royal Engineers. For conspicuous gallantry in action. He displayed great courage and determination when in charge of a working party under very heavy fire, thereby enabling the task to be completed.
- 2nd Lieutenant Robert George Parkhurst, Cheshire Regiment. For conspicuous gallantry in action. He collected every available man near him and went forward, clearing the trench and capturing many of the enemy, at the same time joining up with three waves that had been reorganised, taking command and successfully leading them to their final objective.
- Temp Lieutenant Cyril Gordon Parsons, Wiltshire Regiment. For conspicuous gallantry in action. He, with a Corporal, went out by daylight and carried out a valuable reconnaissance, thereby enabling an advanced strong point to be established.
- Lieutenant Reginald Sherring Partridge, Royal Warwickshire Regiment. For conspicuous gallantry in action. He displayed great courage and initiative when in charge of a raiding party, attacking and dispersing superior numbers of the enemy. He has previously done fine work.
- Temp 2nd Lieutenant Ernest Oliver Phillips, Royal West Kent Regiment. For conspicuous gallantry in action. Although wounded he carried out a daring reconnaissance and brought back most valuable information. He has at all times set a splendid example of courage and coolness.
- Temp Lieutenant John Frederick Alexander Pitcairn, Royal Naval Volunteer Reserve. For conspicuous gallantry in action. He led a bombing attack with great courage and determination. Later, he held a blocking point against repeated enemy attacks.
- Rev. Maurice George Jesser Ponsonby, Royal Army Chaplains' Department. For conspicuous gallantry and devotion to duty. He displayed great courage and determination in attending to the wounded under heavy fire. He undoubtedly saved many lives. He was severely wounded.
- Temp 2nd Lieutenant Francis George Preece, Royal Fusiliers. For conspicuous gallantry in action. He displayed great courage and determination in rallying men under heavy fire and in consolidating his position.
- Temp 2nd Lieutenant Harry Pritchard, Royal Welsh Fusiliers. For conspicuous gallantry in action. When all his men were wounded he remained with a Sergeant, and held his position. On another occasion he led an offensive patrol and bombed an enemy working party.
- Lieutenant Richard Reynolds Rathbone, Liverpool Regiment. For conspicuous gallantry in action. Although wounded, he led a successful raid against the enemy's trenches with great courage and ability. Later, he rescued several wounded men under very heavy fire.
- Temp Captain Philip Hugh Rawson, Royal Army Medical Corps, attached South Staffordshire Regiment. For conspicuous gallantry in action. On several occasions he rescued wounded men under very heavy fire. He set a fine example of courage and coolness throughout.
- Temp 2nd Lieutenant Francis Patrick Kingston Reynette-James, Royal Engineers. For conspicuous gallantry in action. He displayed great courage and determination in laying a line under very heavy fire, thereby enabling touch to be maintained with the leading battalions. Later, he again laid a line under heavy fire.
- Temp Surgeon George Lee Ritchie, MB, RN, attached Royal Naval Division. For conspicuous gallantry and devotion to duty. He displayed great courage and determination in collecting and attending to the wounded under very heavy fire.
- 2nd Lieutenant William Roche, Royal Field Artillery, attached Heavy Trench Mortar Battery. For conspicuous gallantry in action. Although himself suffering from severe shell shock he dug out a gun which had been buried and got it into action. He set a splendid example of courage and determination throughout. He has previously done fine work.
- 2nd Lieutenant Robert Cruden Rodger, Royal Field Artillery, attached Trench Mortar Battery. For conspicuous gallantry in action. He showed marked courage and devotion to duty when observing under heavy fire, and was largely responsible for cutting an important section of the enemy's wire. Later, he rendered valuable services by bringing up a trench mortar.
- Temp 2nd Lieutenant Reginald Randal Rose, Royal Engineers. For conspicuous gallantry in action. He rallied two companies of infantry and set them to work consolidating their position. Later, he was largely instrumental in capturing twelve prisoners.
- Temp Lieutenant Geoffrey Howel Scratton, Argyll & Sutherland Highlanders, attended Royal Highlanders. For conspicuous gallantry in action. He displayed great courage and coolness during the attack. Later, he rendered very valuable assistance during the consolidation of the position under heavy fire.
- Captain Arthur Ashton Smalley, MB, Royal Army Medical Corps. For conspicuous gallantry and devotion to duty. He displayed great courage and determination in attending to the wounded, working continuously for 48 hours under heavy fire. He set a fine example throughout.
- 2nd Lieutenant Eric Butler Smallwood, Hertfordshire Regiment. For conspicuous gallantry in action. When advancing with his machine guns he collected and led a large party of various units to their objective. Later, he took command and handled a company with great courage and skill.
- Temp Surgeon Geoffrey Sparrow, MB, RN, attached Royal Naval Division. For conspicuous gallantry and devotion to duty. He displayed great courage and determination in collecting and attending to the wounded under very heavy fire.
- 2nd Lieutenant Ronald Spicer, Honourable Artillery Company. For conspicuous gallantry in action. He assumed command of and led his company in the attack with great courage and initiative, thereby materially assisting in the success of the operations.
- Temp Lieutenant Douglas Wilfrid Stevens, Nottinghamshire & Derbyshire Regiment. For conspicuous gallantry in action. He assisted to reorganise the brigade at a critical time. He set a splendid example of courage and coolness throughout.
- Temp 2nd Lieutenant Lawrence Ranford Stott, General List, attached Medium Trench Mortar Battery. For conspicuous gallantry in action. He fought his trench mortar guns with great courage and ability, in spite of heavy odds. He set a splendid example of courage and coolness throughout.
- Lieutenant Vivian Home Thomson, Royal Field Artillery. For conspicuous gallantry in action. Although severely wounded, he continued to command his battery with great courage and determination. He has on many previous occasions done fine work.
- Temp Sub-Lieutenant Percy Reginald Wait, Royal Naval Volunteer Reserve, attached Machine Gun Company. For conspicuous gallantry in action. He led carrying parties to the front line under intense fire, thereby keeping up a continual supply of ammunition and stores. Later, he rendered valuable assistance by attending to the wounded.
- 2nd Lieutenant Geoffrey Robert Wallace, Worcestershire Regiment. For conspicuous gallantry in action. He commanded a fighting patrol, with which he successfully raided an enemy trench, killing several of the enemy, and then withdrawing with slight casualties,
- 2nd Lieutenant Francis Victor Wallington, Royal Field Artillery, attached Trench Mortar Battery. For conspicuous gallantry in action. He displayed great courage and skill during wire-cutting operations in preparation for the attack. Later, he brought a trench mortar forward to an exposed position under heavy fire.
- Temp Lieutenant Frank Hewitt Warr, Royal Field Artillery. For conspicuous gallantry in action. When the enemy opened fire with gas shells, he ran through the barrage to warn the men of another section to put their helmets on. On another occasion he displayed great courage and coolness in extricating wounded horses from a wagon under heavy fire.
- 2nd Lieutenant Henry Robertson Watt, Yorkshire Regiment. For conspicuous gallantry in action. He displayed great courage and determination during a bombing attack on the enemy. Although wounded, he continued to throw bombs until the trench was captured.
- Temp Lieutenant Heremon Vandeleur Scott Willcox, Royal Marine Light Infantry. For conspicuous gallantry in action. He fought his trench guns with great courage and determination under very trying conditions. Although wounded, he remained at duty and rendered invaluable Service.
- Rev. David Cynddelw Williams, Royal Army Chaplains' Department, attached Royal Welsh Fusiliers. For conspicuous gallantry and devotion to duty. He accompanied the battalion to the front line, and performed most valuable service in the rescue and tending of the wounded under an intense fire. He has on many previous occasions done fine work.
- Temp 2nd Lieutenant Belford Alexander Wallis Wilson, Hampshire Regiment. For conspicuous gallantry in action. He led two companies to the front line under very heavy fire with great gallantry. Later, he rendered valuable services in organising and leading supply parties to the front line during a period of three days.
- 2nd Lieutenant John Melbourne Wrixon, Cambridgeshire Regiment. For conspicuous gallantry in action. He rendered most valuable assistance in getting the men in their assembly positions. Later, he went forward to ascertain the situation and obtained valuable information.
- Company Sergeant Major Arthur Bonsall, Cheshire Regiment. For conspicuous gallantry in action. He assumed command of and led his company with great courage and determination, capturing many prisoners. He set a fine example throughout.
- Company Sergeant Major Thomas Bowman, Royal Highlanders. For conspicuous gallantry in action. He displayed great courage and determination in rallying and guiding the men of his company towards their objective. He set a splendid example throughout.
- Company Sergeant Major James Coe, Cambridgeshire Regiment. For conspicuous gallantry in action. He displayed great courage and ability when in charge of the first wave, and was largely responsible for organising the first objective. Later, with a few men, he reconnoitred the position and captured 70 prisoners.
- Battery Sergeant Major Harold William Hines, Royal Field Artillery. For conspicuous gallantry in action. He displayed great courage and determination in getting men and horses away without casualties when under heavy shell fire.
- Company Sergeant Major Frederick L. Porton, Royal Fusiliers. For conspicuous gallantry in action. He displayed great courage and initiative in continually assisting his Company Commander to reorganise his company under intense fire. He set a fine example throughout.
- Sergeant Major Thomas Edward Proctor Vaughan, Gloucestershire Regiment. For conspicuous gallantry in action. He worked with untiring energy throughout the day, organising supplies for the line, and setting a fine example of devotion to duty under the worst conditions.

Australian Imperial Force

- 2nd Lieutenant Ernest Francis Armit, Australian Machine Gun Corps. For conspicuous gallantry in action. He assisted the infantry waves from the jumping-off trench, then advanced with his section under intense fire. He set a fine example throughout. He was severely wounded.
- 2nd Lieutenant William John Dickens, Australian Infantry. For conspicuous gallantry in action. He, with a portion of his company, entered the enemy's trench and held it for 24 hours against several desperate counterattacks. He set a fine example of courage and determination throughout.
- Captain John Sylvester Dooley, Australian Infantry. For conspicuous gallantry in action. He handled his company with great courage and initiative. When his trench was subjected to a heavy bombardment he moved his men forward into shell craters, thereby saving many casualties.
- Lieutenant Arthur Bruce Durdin, Australian Infantry. For conspicuous gallantry in action. He showed great dash and leadership in organising his defence, and repelled several bombing attacks from both flanks.
- Captain John Davie Elder, Australian Infantry. For conspicuous gallantry in action. He showed great courage and good leadership in getting his company into the trench and holding on to it under extremely difficult conditions. He set a splendid example throughout.
- 2nd Lieutenant Keith Glanfield Emonson, Australian Infantry. For conspicuous gallantry in action. He displayed great courage and determination in directing his men in the defence of his section of the trench against a raiding party of the enemy. He was severely wounded.
- Captain Wilmot Fenwick, Australian Medical Corps. For conspicuous gallantry and devotion to duty. He worked continuously for 48 hours under very heavy fire tending and dressing the wounded. He set a splendid example of coolness and courage throughout.
- 2nd Lieutenant William Frederick Joseph Hamilton, Australian Infantry. For conspicuous gallantry in action. Although wounded he continued to lead his men with great gallantry, and took charge of a bombing attack against very superior numbers of the enemy. He was again wounded.
- Lieutenant Oscar Roy Howie, Australian Engineers. For conspicuous gallantry in action. After an enemy mine explosion causing casualties, he organised the rescue parties and led them up to the mine, thereby saving many lives, and performed valuable exploration work underground. He carried out this arduous and dangerous work continually for 24 hours.
- Captain James Stanley Malpas, Australian Infantry. For conspicuous gallantry in action. He displayed great resourcefulness and dash in getting his company into an almost impossible position in the trenches. He was severely wounded.
- Lieutenant Henry McCloskey, Australian Pioneers. For conspicuous gallantry in action. He led two platoons under very heavy fire on to the ground, where they had to dig a communication trench. Later, although severely wounded, he remained at his post and continued to encourage his men.
- Captain William Taylor, Australian Pioneers. For conspicuous gallantry in action. He personally supervised the whole work of his company, which was digging a communication trench in daylight under heavy fire. He set a splendid example throughout.
- 2nd Lieutenant William Leo Trenerry, Australian Infantry. For conspicuous gallantry in action. He displayed great courage and determination in the handling of his machine guns under heavy fire, and repelled several enemy attacks.

Canadian Forces

- Lieutenant Edwin Cowen, Canadian Infantry. For conspicuous gallantry in action. After the explosion of a mine, he took charge of the consolidation of two posts under heavy fire, and was mainly responsible for the repulsing of three enemy attacks.
- Lieutenant Angus Archibald McDougall, Princess Patricia's Canadian Light Infantry. For conspicuous gallantry in action. He carried out a dangerous reconnaissance and obtained most valuable information. Later, although very severely wounded, he continued to direct the operations. He has previously done fine work.

==== Awarded a Bar to the Military Cross (MC*) ====
- Captain John Whitaker Woodhouse, MC, Royal Flying Corps (S.R.)
- Captain Percy Emil Julge, MC, Australian Infantry. For conspicuous gallantry in action. He displayed great courage and determination when in charge of a working party who were digging a trench 25 yards from the enemy's front line. He set a splendid example throughout.
- 2nd Lieutenant Henry William Mends May, MC, Hampshire Regiment. For conspicuous gallantry in action. He organised and led an attack against an enemy strong point which was causing casualties, captured the position together with a machine gun and several prisoners. Later, he reorganised his company under heavy fire, reinforced the front line, and consolidated the captured position.
- Temp Lieutenant Robert Albert Plimpton, MC, Argyll & Sutherland Highlanders, attached Royal Highlanders. For conspicuous gallantry in action. He led his men in the attack with great courage and determination, capturing his final objective together with an enemy machine gun and 80 prisoners. Later, in conjunction with another officer, he captured 120 more prisoners.
- Temp. Captain Allen Coulter Hancock, MC, Royal Army Medical Corps
- Captain George Ambrose Pinney, MC, Royal Field Artillery

=== Distinguished Conduct Medal (DCM) ===
- Private F. Abbis, King's Royal Rifle Corps.
- Bombardier H. Agar, Royal Field Artillery
- Sergeant J. Allanson, Royal Field Artillery
- Regimental Sergeant Major. A. Allison, Dragoon Guards
- Sergeant G.O. Anderson, Argyll & Sutherland Highlanders
- Acting Company Sergeant Major (Armament Sergeant Major) J. Anderson, North Lancashire Regiment
- Sergeant W. Anderson, Royal Warwickshire Regiment
- Sergeant T. W. Angel, Rifle Brigade
- Sergeant Major S. Armstrong, Bedfordshire Regiment
- Company Sergeant Major (Acting Sergeant Major) J. J. Atkinson, P.S. attached Durham Light Infantry
- Corporal F. W. Attwood, Border Regiment
- Private A. Bailey, Royal Sussex Regiment
- Corporal J. Bailey, Suffolk Regiment
- Company Sergeant Major W. Baker, Royal Warwickshire Regiment
- Company Sergeant Major F. Bandy, Northamptonshire Regiment
- Company Sergeant Major W. Barbour, Scottish Rifles
- Gunner A. Barclay, Royal Field Artillery
- Sergeant E. T. Barham, Royal West Surrey Regiment
- Company Sergeant Major L. R. Barrett, Gloucestershire Regiment
- Sergeant (Acting Staff Sergeant Major) S. G. Bartlett, Army Service Corps, attached Royal Army Medical Corps
- Acting Sergeant Major R. A. Baughan, Royal Flying Corps
- Sergeant D. R. Baxter, Royal Flying Corps
- Sergeant A. Beanland, Nottinghamshire & Derbyshire Regiment
- Company Sergeant Major W. Beck, York & Lancaster Regiment
- Acting Company Sergeant Major. J. Bell, Yorkshire Light Infantry
- Sergeant H. Beniams, Worcestershire Regiment
- Sergeant Instructor W. Best, Royal Engineers
- Sergeant W. Birchall, South Staffordshire Regiment
- Lance Corporal E. J. Bird, Suffolk Regiment, attached Trench Mortar Battery
- Sergeant S. S. Bird, Liverpool Regiment
- Company Sergeant Major A. Bissett, Cameron Highlanders
- Sergeant J. S. Blakey, Lincolnshire Regiment
- Farrier Sergeant H. Bliss, Royal Field Artillery
- Acting Corporal T. H. Blower, West Yorkshire Regiment
- Sergeant (Acting Quartermaster Sergeant) J. D. Boulsbee, Royal Engineers
- Company Sergeant Major W. G. Bowditch, London Regiment
- Sergeant (Acting Quartermaster Sergeant) A. Bowers, Coldstream Guards
- Armament Staff Sergeant F. W. Bowes, Army Ordnance Corps
- Sergeant (Acting Sergeant Major) A. W. Bray, Military Mounted Police
- Sergeant R. Breathwaite, A.K. Cable Section, attached Signal Company, Royal Engineers
- Sergeant E. Brierley, Royal Engineers
- Company Sergeant Major A. Briggs, Nottinghamshire & Derbyshire Regiment
- Bombardier H. Brindle, Royal Field Artillery
- Sergeant J. Brindley, Royal Engineers
- Private P. Broadhurst, Shropshire Light Infantry
- Battery Sergeant Major (Acting Sergeant Major) E. Broom, Royal Field Artillery
- Sergeant P. Brophy, Royal Dublin Fusiliers
- Quartermaster Sergeant E. J. Brown, Hampshire Regiment
- Drummer G. L. Brown, Gordon Highlanders
- Quartermaster Sergeant T. W. Brown, Grenadier Guards
- Private T. W. Brown, Royal Army Medical Corps
- Quartermaster Sergeant (Acting Sergeant Major) A. Burgoyne, South Staffordshire Regiment.
- Company Sergeant Major F. Burns, Lancashire Fusiliers
- Sergeant H. Burns, Scottish Rifles
- Acting Lance Sergeant J.C. Bush, Leicestershire Regiment
- 11420 Sergeant J. Butler, Shropshire Light Infantry
- Gunner H. Butterfield, Royal Field Artillery
- Sergeant A. E. Callaghan, Gloucestershire Regiment
- Sergeant T. Campbell, Royal Engineers
- Sergeant (Acting Staff Sergeant Major) E. Canning, Military Mounted Police
- Gunner J. J. Cantwell, Royal Field Artillery
- Company Sergeant Major P. P. Carr, East Yorkshire Regiment
- Private E. Carroll, Royal Irish Fusiliers
- Sergeant A. Carter, Royal Fusiliers
- Acting Sergeant Major L. E. Carter, Royal Flying Corps
- Sergeant J. T. Chape, Army Service Corps
- Company Sergeant Major J. Chaplin, South Wales Borderers
- Chief Petty Officer W. G. Chapman, Royal Navy
- Private A. Charlton, M.T., attached Canadian Divisional Artillery, Army Service Corps
- Private M. Charnock, Royal Army Medical Corps
- Corporal A. Chilcott, Royal Scots Fusiliers
- Sergeant G.C. Churchett, Machine Gun Corps
- Sergeant T. Clark, Machine Gun Corps
- Sergeant T. Clark, London Regiment
- Sergeant Major. R. G. Coghlan, Durham Light Infantry
- Private G. Coles, Dragoon Guards
- Gunner E. Coley, Royal Garrison Artillery
- Battery Sergeant Major A. Collett, Royal Field Artillery
- Company Sergeant Major H. Collins, London Regiment.
- Sergeant (Acting Staff Sergeant Major) J. Cooke, Military Mounted Police
- Sergeant Drummer R. M. Cooper, Nottinghamshire & Derbyshire Regiment
- Sergeant W. J. Corbett, Gloucestershire Regiment
- Sergeant W. J. Cossey, East Surrey Regiment
- Sergeant A. J. Cottridge, Royal Garrison Artillery
- Battery Sergeant Major T. Cotton, Royal Garrison Artillery (attached Heavy Artillery Group)
- Sergeant J. T. Cox, Connaught Rangers
- Private T. Coyne, York & Lancaster Regiment
- Acting Company Sergeant Major S. Craig, Royal Irish Fusiliers
- Sapper P. A. Crofts, Royal Engineers
- Acting Corporal J. E. G. Crow, Royal Field Artillery
- Acting Sergeant Major T. Cumming, P.S., attached Nottinghamshire & Derbyshire Regiment
- Private H. W. Cunningham, Dorsetshire Regiment
- Sergeant J. Curtin, Irish Guards
- Battery Quartermaster Sergeant Davison, Royal Field Artillery
- Sergeant T.H. Day, Yorkshire Regiment
- Sergeant W. Dealtry, Royal Munster Fusiliers
- Corporal T. Dean, Royal Engineers
- Sergeant J. W. Decker, Machine Gun Corps
- Battery Sergeant Major S. J. Denchfield, Royal Field Artillery
- Sergeant C. J. Dennett, Royal Engineers
- Company Sergeant Major (Drill Sergeant) (Acting Sergeant Major) G. F. Dent, Coldstream Guards
- Private A. A. Devey, Royal Army Medical Corps
- Company Sergeant Major C. P. G. Dewson, South Staffordshire Regiment
- Lance Corporal T. J. Dinwoodie, Royal Highlanders
- Battery Quartermaster Sergeant W. Doble, Royal Garrison Artillery
- Private H. Dower, Royal Fusiliers
- Sergeant J. Dowle, Gloucestershire Regiment
- Sergeant J. Downing, Yorkshire Regiment
- Company Sergeant Major J. H. Driscoll, London Regiment
- Sergeant (Acting Company Sergeant Major) C. Duffy, Army Service Corps
- Sergeant E. Dugmore, Royal Army Medical Corps
- Sergeant W. J. Dunn, Royal Lancaster Regiment
- Private D. Dunne, Royal Dublin Fusiliers
- Sergeant H. Edgar, Royal Engineers
- Sergeant R. Edwards, Depot, South Wales Borderers
- Sergeant W. T. Edwards, South Wales Borderers
- Acting Sergeant Major F. Eldridge, Royal Flying Corps
- Acting Sergeant R. F. Ellingworth, Royal Engineers
- Sergeant Major H. Evans, Royal Naval Division
- Sergeant T. Evans, Welsh Regiment
- Corporal C. Farrar, West Yorkshire Regiment
- Corporal H. Fay, Cheshire Regiment, attached Trench Mortar Battery
- Company Sergeant Major F. Fell, Royal Engineers
- Company Sergeant Major (Acting Sergeant Major) H. Fenton, West Yorkshire Regiment
- Sergeant S. Fenton, Royal Scots
- Sergeant-Fitter H. M. Fisher, Royal Field Artillery
- Farrier Staff Sergeant W. G. Flatters, Royal Garrison Artillery
- Sapper (Acting Sergeant) A. G. Fleet, Royal Engineers
- Company Sergeant Major J. Forbes, Gordon Highlanders
- Sergeant T. M. Forrester, Lancashire Fusiliers
- Company Sergeant Major R. Forster, Yorkshire Regiment
- Corporal R. H. Foster, East Yorkshire Regiment
- Company Sergeant Major A. H. Freeborn, Highland Light Infantry
- Sergeant W. E. Freeman, Norfolk Regiment
- Flight Sergeant H. A. Gamon, Royal Flying Corps
- Sergeant. G. Garbutt, Royal Field Artillery
- Lance Sergeant F. Gettins, East Kent Regiment
- Private A. Gibson, Welsh Regiment
- Sergeant J. Gibson, Royal Irish Regiment
- Armament Staff Sergeant D. K. Glass, Army Ordnance Corps, Royal Field Artillery
- Corporal H. Godley, Leicestershire Regiment.
- Quartermaster Sergeant J. Goloska, Somerset Light Infantry
- Corporal. W. Gooderidge, York & Lancaster Regiment
- Acting Battery Sergeant Major E. Goodhew, Royal Field Artillery
- Lance Corporal (Acting Corporal) J. H. Gordon, Royal Engineers
- Sergeant. H. Gowan, Manchester Regiment
- Sergeant. J. Grant, Border Regiment
- Company Sergeant Major H. T. Gravells, Lincolnshire Regiment
- Sergeant A. E. Green, Royal Engineers
- Regimental Quartermaster Sergeant W. Green, Hussars
- Company Sergeant Major W. B. Green, Manchester Regiment
- 2nd Corporal (Acting Corporal) T. Greenslade, Royal Engineers
- Quartermaster Sergeant T. Gregory, Royal Inniskilling Fusiliers
- Company Sergeant Major J. J. Guest, Coldstream Guards
- Corporal E. H. Hallows, Royal Field Artillery
- Sergeant T. Hamer, East Kent Regiment
- Sergeant G. Hands, London Regiment
- Sergeant G. Hankinson, Royal Field Artillery
- Sergeant J. Harris, Welsh Regiment
- Sergeant. G. E. Harrison, King's Royal Rifle Corps
- Sig. Sergeant J. Harrison, King's Own Scottish Borderers
- Lance Corporal A. J. Hart, Royal Engineers
- Sergeant S. Harvey, Cheshire Regiment
- Sergeant W. Harvey, Royal Engineers
- Private E. Hastings, Royal Scots
- Sergeant J. Hatch, Royal Garrison Artillery
- Private E. Hawley, Nottinghamshire & Derbyshire Regiment
- Sergeant R. H. Hayson, Border Regiment
- Private L. A. Head, Machine Gun Company
- Company Sergeant Major C. F. Hemingway, Yorkshire Light Infantry
- 2nd Corporal (Acting Corporal) F. Hendrey, Royal Engineers
- Sergeant Major W. B. Heycock, Welsh Regiment
- Private J. Hill, Nottinghamshire & Derbyshire Regiment
- Acting Bombardier W. Hill, Royal Field Artillery
- Company Sergeant Major J. Hind, York & Lancaster Regiment
- Corporal J. Hine, Royal Garrison Artillery
- Sergeant L. Hinton, Liverpool Regiment
- Private H. Hobson, Gloucestershire Regiment
- Company Sergeant Major A. Hole, West Yorkshire Regiment
- Corporal J. Hollingsworth, Rifle Brigade
- Corporal G. Holmes, West Yorkshire Regiment
- Company Sergeant Major W. Hopkins, Scots Guards
- Lance Corporal G. W. Howes, Royal Engineers
- Sergeant T. Howley, Royal Munster Fusiliers
- Sergeant (Acting Company Sergeant Major) E. Hoyten, Royal Engineers
- Sergeant S. Hubbard, Machine Gun Company
- Lance Corporal J. Hudson, Worcestershire Regiment (attached Light Trench Mortar Battery)
- Company Sergeant Major W. Humphrey, Royal Sussex Regiment
- Acting Company Sergeant Major G. W. Humphreys, West Yorkshire Regiment
- Private J. F. Hurley, Royal Dublin Fusiliers
- Private R. Huskisson, Royal Warwickshire Regiment
- Sergeant (Acting Quartermaster Sergeant) J. Huxford, Gloucestershire Regiment
- Company Sergeant Major G. Imisson, York & Lancaster Regiment
- Company Sergeant Major G. Irvine, Highland Light Infantry
- Sergeant A. F. Jackson, Northumberland Fusiliers
- Sergeant W. E. Jackson, Cheshire Regiment
- Sergeant E. Jagger, Scottish Rifles
- Acting Sergeant H. H. Jakeman, Machine Gun Company
- Lance Corporal (Acting 2nd Corporal) J. James, Royal Engineers
- Sergeant J. Jamieson, Cameron Highlanders
- Company Sergeant Major J. Jesse, Machine Gun Company
- Private W. Johnson, East Yorkshire Regiment
- Sergeant C. Jones, Royal Welch Fusiliers
- Colour Sergeant E. Jones, Grenadier Guards
- Sergeant G. Jones, East Surrey Regiment
- Lance Corporal J. Jones, Manchester Regiment
- Acting Sergeant Major J. C. Jones, Royal Flying Corps
- Sergeant J. R. Jones, London Regiment
- Quartermaster Sergeant R. Jones, Royal Munster Fusiliers
- Sergeant W. Jones, Royal Welch Fusiliers
- Corporal A. J. Keen, Royal Field Artillery
- Sergeant A. J. Kellyn, Royal Engineers
- Battery Sergeant Major C. B. Kendal, Royal Field Artillery
- Petty Officer J. Kent, Royal Navy
- Sergeant. S. Kent, Nottinghamshire & Derbyshire Regiment
- Quartermaster Sergeant E. P. Kerrison, Bedfordshire Regiment
- Corporal H.F. Kettle, Shropshire Light Infantry
- Sergeant G. King, Royal Inniskilling Fusiliers
- Lance Corporal (Acting Sergeant) H. King, Middlesex Regiment
- Company Sergeant Major W. H. King, Nottinghamshire & Derbyshire Regiment
- Lance Corporal A. T. Kingston, Royal Engineers
- Sergeant T. Kinnaird, Royal Scots
- Corporal A. Knight, Royal Engineers
- Sergeant Major J. Lacey, Nottinghamshire & Derbyshire Regiment
- Sergeant G. E. Lait, Gloucestershire Regiment
- Sergeant C. I. Langeard, Royal Irish Rifles
- Sergeant G. Larum, Yorkshire Regiment
- Sergeant Major E. Lawrence, Essex Regiment
- Corporal S. E. Lawrence, Royal Field Artillery
- Private W. Leigh, North Lancashire Regiment
- Armament Staff Sergeant (Acting Armament Sergeant Major) W. J. Le Petit, Army Ordnance Corps
- Sergeant J. C. Lever, Machine Gun Company
- Sergeant. C. H. Lewis, Royal Field Artillery
- Company Sergeant Major E. C. Lillystone, Essex Regiment
- Company Sergeant Major T. Lines, Cheshire Regiment
- Sergeant J. Little, Cameron Highlanders
- Company Sergeant Major G. W. Lloyd, Liverpool Regiment
- Company Sergeant Major S. H. Lomas, Nottinghamshire & Derbyshire Regiment
- Sergeant F. E. Lumb, West Riding Regiment
- Lance Corporal (Acting Sergeant Major) F. Lundy, Military Mounted Police
- Sergeant J. Lutman, Machine Gun Corps
- Corporal T. F. Lyttle, Royal Army Medical Corps
- Sergeant Piper A. Mackenzie, Seaforth Highlanders
- Sergeant W. Mackrory, Army Service Corps, attached H.Q. Corps H.A.
- Company Sergeant Major J. Magnay, Machine Gun Corps
- Lance Corporal (Acting Sergeant) L. Makin, Army Service Corps
- Coropral (Lance Sergeant) W. C. Malkowsky, South Staffordshire Regiment
- Company Sergeant Major O. Maltby, Yorkshire Light Infantry Special Reserve
- Corporal T. Marah, Royal Garrison Artillery
- Sergeant W. Marchington, Nottinghamshire & Derbyshire Regiment
- Acting Sergeant Major C. Marley, Royal Flying Corps
- Private G. F. Marston, Leicestershire Regiment
- Company Sergeant Major W. Mather, Highland Light Infantry
- Bombardier G. Matthew, Royal Field Artillery
- Company Sergeant Major F. P. Mawditt, Royal West Surrey Regiment
- Sergeant J. Maxwell, Gordon Highlanders
- Sergeant T. C. Maynard, Royal Garrison Artillery
- Sergeant A. McCune, Grenadier Guards
- Private W. McDermott, Argyll & Sutherland Highlanders (Special Reserve)
- Company Sergeant Major J. McDonald, Yorkshire Regiment
- Sergeant T. McDonald, Royal Irish Regiment
- Corporal W. McGovern, Lancashire Fusiliers
- Private D. A. Mclntosh, Northumberland Fusiliers
- Company Sergeant Major P. McLachlan, Cameron Highlanders
- Quartermaster Sergeant R. G. McVitty, Duke of Cornwall's Light Infantry.
- Lance Corporal R. Metcalf, Yorkshire Light Infantry
- Sergeant D. W. Miller, Middlesex Regiment
- Staff Sergeant F J. Milne, Lancers, attached Reserve Regiment of Cavalry
- Battery Sergeant Major F. Mitchell, Royal Garrison Artillery
- Sergeant J. Mitchell, Royal Highlanders
- Sergeant (Acting Company Quartermaster Sergeant) J. Moisley, Army Service Corps, attached Infantry Brigade H.Q.
- Company Quartermaster Sergeant (Acting Sergeant Major) W. Moorhouse, Yorkshire Light Infantry, Special Reserve
- Private V. Morgan, King Edward's Horse.
- Private J. Morris, Middlesex Regiment
- Sergeant S. Morris, Royal Engineers
- Battery Quartermaster Sergeant. J. Morrison, Royal Field Artillery
- Sergeant F. A. Morrow, Worcestershire Regiment
- Sergeant (Acting Sergeant Major) A. G. Moss, Royal Field Artillery
- Sergeant J. Murphy, Royal Field Artillery
- Sergeant P. Murphy, Royal Welch Fusiliers
- Company Sergeant Major J. H. Nash, Royal Warwickshire Regiment
- Company Sergeant Major J. Neary, East Lancashire Regiment
- Acting Corporal H. Noak, M.T., Army Service Corps
- Corporal G. Noakes, Royal Army Medical Corps
- Company Sergeant Major (Acting Regimental Sergeant Major) S. C. Nowlan, York & Lancaster Regiment
- Sergeant (Acting Company Sergeant Major) P. J. O'Neill, Royal Irish Fusiliers
- Sergeant S. O'Neill, Northumberland Fusiliers
- Private P. O'Reilly, Royal Irish Rifles
- Sergeant J. Ostle, Royal Engineers
- Gunner K. H. Oxtoby, Royal Field Artillery
- Private F. Padmore, South Staffordshire Regiment
- Corporal T. P. Palmer, Royal Garrison Artillery
- Private R. Parkes (now Depot), W. Yorkshire Regiment
- Sergeant (Acting Battery Quartermaster Sergeant) F. C. Parsons, Royal Field Artillery
- Corporal A. Pattie, Lancashire Fusiliers
- Acting Bombardier R. G. Pavey, Royal Field Artillery, attached Trench Mortar Battery
- Sergeant H. P. J. Peacock, Royal Engineers.
- Sergeant B. J. Peake, Shropshire Light Infantry
- Sergeant T. E. Pennington, Manchester Regiment
- Quartermaster Sergeant (Foreman of Works) H. S. Pepper, Royal Engineers
- Acting Lance Corporal. H. W. Perry, Royal Warwickshire Regiment
- Battery Sergeant Major W. E. Perry, Royal Field Artillery
- Sapper R. F. Peters, Royal Engineers
- Sergeant E. M. Phillips, Royal Engineers
- Gunner T./Bombardier. W. Pike, Royal Marine Artillery
- Private O. F. V. Piper, Army Service Corps
- Sergeant E. Playle, Royal Field Artillery
- Corporal J. Pollendine, Royal Engineers
- Private G. Porteous, late South Staffordshire Regiment
- Company Sergeant Major J. Porter, King's Royal Rifle Corps
- Company Sergeant Major (Acting Sergeant Major) W. Portlock, Gloucestershire Regiment
- Sergeant J. Powis, Royal Army Medical Corps
- Corporal A. Prankard, South Lancashire Regiment, attached Trench Mortar Battery
- Sergeant G. H. Pullen, Royal Engineers
- Staff Sergeant Major T. R. Quigley, Royal Engineers
- Private G. R. Quinton, Machine Gun Corps (formerly Suffolk Regiment).
- Corporal T. Rainford, Royal Field Artillery
- Battery Quartermaster Sergeant D. Ramsay, Royal Field Artillery
- Company Sergeant Major R. Rankin, Royal West Kent Regiment
- Corporal (Acting Company Sergeant Major) P. Ranson, Army Service Corps
- Company Sergeant Major A. F. Raven, Norfolk Regiment
- Sergeant H. B. Raymond, Royal Field Artillery
- Bombardier W. Rayner, Royal Field Artillery
- Sergeant Major F. Raynor, West Yorkshire Regiment
- 2nd Corporal H. Reed, Royal Engineers
- Gunner W. Reed, Royal Field Artillery
- Sergeant J. Reeves, London Regiment
- Corporal S. G. Reeves, Royal Field Artillery, attached Trench Mortar Battery
- Sergeant Major H. D. Reid, King Edward's Horse.
- Private A. E. Roberts, Manchester Regiment
- Gunner E. T. Roberts, Royal Garrison Artillery
- Corporal W. Rose, Suffolk Regiment
- Sergeant D. Ross, King's Own Scottish Borderers
- Sergeant. W. Ross, Depot, Hampshire Regiment
- Company Sergeant Major (Acting Sergeant Major) H. Rowbotham, Royal Fusiliers
- Squadron Sergeant Major C. Rowland, Lancers
- Sergeant L. V. Royall, Coldstream Guards
- Private G. Roye, Mounted Military Police
- Sergeant W. E. Rudlin, Grenadier Guards, attached Guards Machine Gun Corps
- Bombardier G. W. A. Russell, Royal Field Artillery
- Staff Sergeant C. Sanders, Royal Army Medical Corps
- Company Sergeant Major (Acting Sergeant Major) H. E. Saunders, Royal Fusiliers
- Sergeant Major H. Savill, Royal Fusiliers
- Corporal (Acting Sergeant) F. G. Sawyer, Royal Sussex Regiment
- Acting Battery Sergeant Major A. Sayer, Royal Field Artillery
- Company Sergeant Major M. F. Scholes. West Yorkshire Regiment
- Battery Quartermaster Sergeant F. Schulen, Royal Field Artillery
- Battery Sergeant Major W. A. Searle, Royal Field Artillery
- 2nd Corporal (Acting Corporal) T. Sendall, Royal Engineers
- Sergeant J. Seville, Royal Engineers
- Sergeant (Acting Company Quartermaster Sergeant) O T. Sharpe, Lincolnshire Regiment
- Corporal A. J. Sheldon, Royal Engineers
- Acting Sergeant Major W. C. Shepherd, Highland Light Infantry
- Company Quartermaster Sergeant T. Shields, Seaforth Highlanders
- Company Sergeant Major J. H. Shirley, King's Royal Rifle Corps
- Lance Sergeant A. Schoolbread, Gloucestershire Regiment
- Corporal P. A. Shrubsole, Royal Horse Artillery
- Sergeant (Acting Company Sergeant Major) F. E. Simmonds, Royal Engineers
- Sergeant Major H. Sinclair, Royal Engineers
- Corporal H. A. Smith, Royal Field Artillery
- Sapper (Acting Lance Corporal) O. F. Smith, Royal Engineers
- Sergeant H. Snell, Devonshire Regiment
- Private F. Snowdin, Nottinghamshire & Derbyshire Regiment
- Company Sergeant Major G. Soanes, Welsh Regiment
- Corporal W. Speake, Royal Engineers
- Private J. Spencer, Nottinghamshire & Derbyshire Regiment
- Sergeant F. G. J. Spicer, Royal Sussex Regiment
- Sergeant A. W. J. Spilsbury, Worcestershire Regiment
- Company Sergeant Major J. Stanton, Connaught Rangers
- Corporal A. H. Stevens, Machine Gun Corps
- Bombardier J. W. Stigger, Royal Field Artillery
- Company Sergeant Major V. G. Stocker, A. Cyclist Corps
- Gunner F. Stopford, Royal Field Artillery
- Company Sergeant Major C. E. Stovin, Royal Irish Rifles
- Company Sergeant Major W. Sunderland, West Yorkshire Regiment
- Battery Sergeant Major J. Swain, Royal Field Artillery
- Corporal A. Swansbury, Leicestershire Regiment
- Sergeant Major C. W. Tapson, Royal Army Medical Corps
- Lance Corporal (Acting Corporal) F. Taylor, Hampshire Regiment
- Sergeant (Acting Company Sergeant Major) G. W. Terry, Royal Engineers
- Drummer J. Thomas, Royal Inniskilling Fusiliers
- Acting Regimental Sergeant Major A. Thompson, Royal Field Artillery
- Sergeant A. J. Thomson, Gordon Highlanders
- Sergeant A. Thorn, Royal Engineers
- Private G. Thorne, Leicestershire Regiment
- Company Sergeant Major A. H. Tilley, Army Service Corps
- Corporal (Acting Sergeant) J. Tillotson, West Riding Regiment
- Acting Sergeant I. S. Timmins, Royal Irish Fusiliers
- Sergeant H. E. Tobin, Royal Garrison Artillery
- Corporal L. Tomes, attached Trench Mortar Battery, Royal Garrison Artillery
- Sergeant M. Toohey, Machine Gun Corps
- Company Sergeant Major H. J. Toulson, Nottinghamshire & Derbyshire Regiment
- Company Sergeant Major H. F. Tring, South Wales Borderers
- Drummer E. G. C. Trussler, Royal Sussex Regiment
- Lance Corporal A. E. Tubb, Northumberland Fusiliers
- Lance Corporal R. Tull, Royal Lancaster Regiment
- Leading Seaman (Higher Grade) S. Turner, Anson Brigade, Royal Naval Division
- Private J. T. Urwin, Northumberland Fusiliers
- Private E. Vass, Leicestershire Regiment
- Sergeant G. Waddington, Scottish Rifles (attached Trench Mortar Battery)
- Company Sergeant Major C. Wakeham, Durham Light Infantry
- Corporal A. Walker, Nottinghamshire & Derbyshire Regiment
- Bombardier B. Walker, Royal Field Artillery
- Colour Sergeant J. W. Walsh, Irish Guards, P.S. London Regiment
- Sergeant T. Walsh, North Lancashire Regiment (attached Trench Mortar Battery)
- Corporal (Acting Sergeant) F. Warr, Royal Engineers
- Gunner A. H. Watling, Royal Field Artillery
- Sergeant A. Waudby, Rifle Brigade
- Lance Corporal G. Webb, East Surrey Regiment
- Sergeant (Acting Company Quartermaster Sergeant) W. Webb, Royal Sussex Regiment (attached Machine Gun Company)
- Sergeant E. Wedgbury, Worcestershire Regiment
- Company Sergeant Major J. Weldon, Northumberland Fusiliers
- Corporal E. J. West, King's Royal Rifle Corps
- Sergeant R. White, Gordon Highlanders
- Private R. G. White, Oxfordshire & Buckinghamshire Light Infantry
- Sergeant (Acting Company Sergeant Major) R. P. W. White, Royal Engineers
- Acting Sergeant T.G.O. White, Machine Gun Corps
- Sergeant W. White, Royal Army Medical Corps
- Quartermaster Sergeant I. H. Whiteing, North Lancashire Regiment
- Company Quartermaster Sergeant G. Wilkins, Royal Scots Fusiliers
- Company Sergeant Major E. Williams, Royal Lancaster Regiment
- 1st Class Staff Sergeant Major G. Williams, Army Service Corps
- Sergeant I. Williams, London Regiment
- Acting Sergeant J. Williams, Cheshire Regiment
- Sergeant J. H. Williams, South Wales Borderers
- Corporal (Acting Sergeant) R. J. Williams, Royal Field Artillery
- Battery Quartermaster Sergeant J. Williamson, Royal Field Artillery
- Corporal H. Wilson, Royal Engineers
- Battery Sergeant Major W. Wilson, Royal Field Artillery
- Corporal (Acting Company Quartermaster Sergeant) L. W. Witham, Royal Engineers
- Sergeant Major M. H. Wood, Grenadier Guards
- Corporal W. Wood, Leicester Regiment
- Company Sergeant Major H. Woodhead, Royal Engineers
- Company Quartermaster Sergeant T. E. Woodward, Royal Scots Fusiliers
- Sergeant J. H. Wortley, London Regiment
- Sergeant G. Wright, Royal Fusiliers
- Sergeant (Acting Company Sergeant Major) H. C. Wright, East Kent Regiment
- Farrier Quartermaster Sergeant J. Wright, Royal Field Artillery
- Battery Sergeant Major P. Wright, Royal Field Artillery

Australian Imperial Force

- Corporal J. F. Barrett, Australian Army Medical Corps (attached Australian Infantry)
- Sergeant Major A. Bell, Australian Infantry
- Sergeant C. V. M. Besanko, Australian Infantry
- Corporal E. R. Cavanagh, Australian Infantry
- Sergeant R. Cornish, Australian Infantry
- Private F. L. Croft, Australian Infantry
- Private A. J. Dunn, Australian Infantry
- Sergeant J. B. Gordon, Australian Infantry
- Sergeant. W. B. Hatton, Australian Infantry
- Sergeant G. H. Hirst, Australian Infantry
- Gunner Acting Bombardier A. N. Hudson, Australian Field Artillery
- Lance Corporal J. F. Kerr, Aust. Machine Gun Company (formerly Australian Infantry)
- Staff Sergeant H. King, H.Q., Australian Infantry Brigade
- Bombardier J. Lee, Australian Field Artillery
- Company Sergeant Major C. E. Loten, Australian Machine Gun Company
- Sergeant A. R. Matthews, Australian Infantry
- Lance Sergeant. M. J. McGregor, Australian Infantry
- 2nd Corporal W. A. McKay, Australian Engineers
- Sergeant G. D. McLean, Australian Infantry (attached Australian Light Trench Mortar Battery)
- Acting Company Sergeant Major S. Munro, Australian Infantry
- Private. H. Murcutt, Machine Gun Company
- Sergeant A. H. Nowatna, Australian Infantry
- Warrant Officer E. J. O'Neill, Australian Army Service Corps
- Corporal A. T. Paul, H.Q., Australian Field Artillery
- Private W. Plunkett, Australian Infantry
- Warrant Officer W. B. Robinson, Australian Army Medical Corps
- Sergeant A. G. Ross, Australian Infantry
- Private F. J. Schenscher, Australian Infantry
- Corporal J. Steele, Australian Artillery
- Sergeant W. G. Swinton, Australian Infantry
- Lance Corporal S. R. Thomas, Australian Infantry
- Corporal S. F. Thompson, Australian Field Artillery
- Private W. A. Ward, Australian Infantry
- Sergeant R. Webb, Machine Gun Company
- Corporal A. White, Australian Infantry (attached Australian Light Trench Mortar Battery)
- Sergeant T. W. Whitehead, Australian Engineers
- Company Sergeant Major A. E. Wicks, Australian Infantry
- Private P. P. Widdop, Australian Infantry
- Company Sergeant Major C. E. Wilkie, Australian Infantry
- Corporal G. C. Wilson, Australian Engineers
- Corporal E. T. Wood, Australian Field Artillery
- Sergeant H. T. Wraight, Australian Infantry
- Lance Corporal W. R. Young, Australian Infantry

Canadian Contingent

- Sergeant F. Barber. Canadian Mounted Rifles, attached Divisional Signal Company
- Sergeant F. H. Bates, Canadian Engineers
- Sergeant H. V. A. Bealer, Canadian Infantry
- Battery Sergeant Major M. Beards, Canadian Artillery
- Corporal (Acting Sergeant) W. J. Bennett, Canadian Infantry
- Lance Corporal. W. Bircham, Canadian Infantry
- Sergeant Major J. Bisset, Canadian Army Service Corps
- Transport Sergeant W. Blyth, Canadian Infantry
- Company Sergeant Major F. Bowles, Canadian Engineers
- Lance Corporal L. Bradley, Canadian Army Medical Corps
- Bombardier R. B. Bradley, Canadian Field Artillery
- Acting Company Sergeant Major A. Brookes, Canadian Infantry
- Private W. M. Brown, Canadian Infantry
- Sergeant Major W. H. Buddell, Canadian Infantry
- Company Sergeant Major G. Cope, Canadian Infantry
- Sergeant F. J. Corcoran, Canadian Engineers
- Acting Company Sergeant Major C. F. Dawson, Canadian Infantry
- Quartermaster Sergeant J. Donovan, Canadian Infantry
- Lance Corporal J. Ferrier, Canadian Army Service Corps
- Sergeant Major W. Fitzgerald, Canadian Infantry
- Sergeant W. J. Gerring, Canadian Infantry
- Company Sergeant Major F. Gillingham, Princess Patricia's Canadian Light Infantry
- Acting Company Sergeant Major F. Gledhill, Canadian Infantry
- Sergeant Major (now temp. Lieutenant) H. C. Good, Canadian Infantry
- Sergeant Major A. W. Hawkey, Canadian Mounted Rifles
- Company Sergeant Major. (Acting Regimental Sergeant Major) E.W. Haydon, Canadian Infantry
- Acting Lance Corporal W. Hayward, Canadian Mounted Rifles
- Sergeant W. A. Jackson, Machine Gun Corps
- Sergeant R. Keillor, Machine Gun Corps
- Company Sergeant Major G. W. Kennedy, Canadian Infantry
- Private (Acting Corporal) G. Knox, Canadian Infantry
- Company Sergeant Major P. J. S. Laing, Canadian Infantry
- Sergeant J. Latham, Canadian Infantry
- Signal Sergeant W. H. Lewis, Canadian Infantry
- Sergeant G. E. Levy, Machine Gun Corps
- Corporal W. P. Loggie, Canadian Mounted Rifles
- Sergeant. W. D. Mackie, Canadian Infantry
- Company Sergeant Major J. W. Mansfield, Canadian Engineers
- Sergeant A. McClintock, Canadian Infantry
- Corporal A. R. Mendizabal, Canadian Artillery
- Gunner (Acting Bombardier) S. W. Morgan, Canadian Artillery (attached Canadian Trench Mortar Battery)
- Sergeant G. C. Oliver, Canadian Engineers
- Corporal J. D. Paterson, Cyclist Battalion, Canadian Corps
- Company Sergeant Major C. E. B. Rea, Canadian Infantry
- Battery Sergeant Major W. B. Rimmer, Canadian Artillery
- Company Sergeant Major R. J. Roberts, Royal Canadian Regiment
- Sergeant J. Robinson, Canadian Infantry
- Corporal F. Ross, Canadian Infantry
- Corporal S. C. Routh, Canadian Artillery
- Private B. Sankoske, Canadian Infantry
- Corporal F. C. Shoesmith, Canadian Infantry
- 2nd Corporal J. H. Short, Canadian Engineers
- Squadron Quartermaster Sergeant. H. G. Simmons, Canadian Infantry Brigade
- Company Sergeant Major H. W. Steel, Canadian Army Service Corps
- Sergeant T. Toon, Canadian Engineers
- Private G. V. Tuffery, Canadian Mounted Rifles
- Sergeant E. Turnbull, Canadian Artillery
- Sergeant F. D. Turner, Canadian Engineers
- Sergeant Major. F. W. Uden, Canadian Infantry
- Company Sergeant Major L. L. Verdon, Canadian Infantry
- Quartermaster Sergeant C. A. Walker, Canadian Infantry
- Corporal F. A. White, Canadian Infantry
- Private G. H. Whiteford, Canadian Infantry (attached Canadian Trench Mortar Battery)
- Sergeant. H. A. Whitmore, Canadian Mounted Rifles

South African Contingent

- Acting Battery Sergeant Major S. G. Dacombe, Royal Marine Artillery (attached Siege Battery)
- Sergeant W. Guest, Royal Marine Artillery, attached Siege Battery, South African Artillery.
- Company Quartermaster Sergeant C. H. Ison, South African Engineers.
- Sergeant J. W. Meyer, South African Infantry.

New Zealand Force

- Corporal A. W. Brown, New Zealand Machine Gun Corps
- Sergeant C. Brown, New Zealand Army Service Corps
- Lance Corporal J. P. Egan, Otago Regiment
- Sergeant C. Gair, New Zealand Rifle Brigade
- Rifleman R. Marks, New Zealand Rifle Brigade
- Company Sergeant Major E. M. Vicery, New Zealand Engineers

For acts of gallantry and devotion to duty in the Field —

- Sergeant-Piper T. Aitken, Argyll and Sutherland Highlanders. For conspicuous gallantry in action. He has performed consistent good work throughout, and has at all times under fire set a splendid example of coolness and courage.
- Corporal J. W. Archer, Cambridgeshire Regiment. For conspicuous gallantry in action. He displayed great courage and skill in establishing and maintaining communications at a critical time. He set a splendid example throughout.
- Private T. Archer, Machine Gun Corps. For conspicuous gallantry in action. He took charge of a machine gun and proceeded with it to the enemy's front line trenches. He remained in position for 43 hours until relieved.
- Sergeant A. J. Banks, Royal Marine Light Infantry. For conspicuous gallantry in action. He led a bombing party with great courage and determination. He was severely wounded
- Corporal H. L. Barington, Hertfordshire Regiment. For conspicuous gallantry in action. He led a bombing party with great gallantry, and rendered valuable assistance in the consolidation of the position. He has at all times set a splendid example.
- Sergeant W. J. Bell, Royal Engineers. For conspicuous gallantry in action. He displayed great courage and skill in the preparation of a cable, thereby materially assisting in maintaining communication during the attack.
- Acting Corporal H. Board, Royal Field Artillery, attached Trench Mortar Battery. For conspicuous gallantry in action. He fought his trench mortar guns with great courage and determination under very difficult conditions. He has at all times set a fine example.
- Company Sergeant Major T. Bolton, Royal Irish Fusiliers. For conspicuous gallantry in action. He has at all times set a fine example of courage and determination.
- Private H. J. Brickwood, Cambridgeshire Regiment. For conspicuous gallantry in action. He displayed great courage and determination in collecting and attending to the wounded under very heavy fire. He has previously done fine work.
- Sergeant A. E. H. Bright, Royal Fusiliers. For conspicuous gallantry in action. He displayed great courage and determination in blocking and holding up with twelve men an enemy strong point. He set a fine example of coolness and courage.
- Petty Officer W. L. Burnett, Royal Naval Volunteer Reserve. For conspicuous gallantry in action. He rallied his men and led them forward with great gallantry, although he had been previously wounded. Later, he remained out all night with a covering party under heavy fire.
- Lance Corporal Frank Henry Cammell, East Surrey Regiment. For conspicuous gallantry in action. He led a storming party and cleared 100 yards of the hostile trench, himself killing three of the enemy. He set a splendid example throughout.
- Gunner G. Cartwright, Royal Field Artillery, attached Medium Trench Mortar Battery. For conspicuous gallantry in action. He continued to fire his gun in the front line under a very heavy barrage. On another occasion he displayed great courage and coolness in assisting to dig out guns under heavy fire. He has at all times set a fine example.
- Company Sergeant Major W. M. Charles, Royal Scots. For conspicuous gallantry in action. He was in the second wave of the attack, and helped the men to get through the enemy wire. He reorganised the men in shell holes close to the enemy's trench, where he was hit several times by bombs, but remained at duty.
- Sergeant W. D. Cherry, Worcestershire Regiment. For conspicuous gallantry in action. He assumed command of a half company, and carried out his work under fire with marked courage and skill. He has previously done fine work.
- Corporal G. Clark, Royal Field Artillery. For conspicuous gallantry in action. He remained at his post continuously for three days and nights, in order to maintain a complicated system of signal communication. He set a fine example throughout.
- Private F. Collier, Cheshire Regiment. For conspicuous gallantry in action. He successfully laid a line under fire enabling communication to be maintained with battalion headquarters, at a critical time. He set a fine example of courage and coolness.
- Sergeant E. H. Cooper, Royal Scots. For conspicuous gallantry in action. Although very severely wounded, he rallied some men who were retiring, and got them back to the firing line. He set a splendid example of courage and devotion to duty.
- Private Percy George Cornwell, Cambridgeshire Regiment. For conspicuous gallantry in action. He carried a most important message under very heavy fire. He has previously done fine work.
- Gunner J. Deane, Royal Field Artillery, attached Medium Trench Mortar Battery. For conspicuous gallantry in action. He rescued a machine gun under very heavy fire, and brought in many wounded men. On another occasion he repeatedly dug out trench mortars which had been buried.
- Sergeant J. B. Death, Cambridgeshire Regiment. For conspicuous gallantry in action. He carried out a dangerous reconnaissance, and, later, led his platoon forward with great courage and determination.
- Sergeant R. N. Dodds, Royal Engineers. For conspicuous gallantry in action. He organised parties for laying and maintaining telephone cables under very severe fire. He set a splendid example throughout.
- Acting Sergeant W. Findlay, Royal Highlanders. For conspicuous gallantry in action. He, with another Sergeant, reorganised some men and attacked an enemy bombing post, driving the enemy out and rescuing a wounded officer who had been captured.
- Lance Corporal J. Fraser, Machine Gun Corps. For conspicuous gallantry in action. He, with an officer and one man, took a machine gun forward and successfully broke up an enemy counter-attack. He set a fine example of courage and initiative.
- Sergeant E. Freeman, Nottinghamshire & Derbyshire Regiment. For conspicuous gallantry in action. He pushed on rapidly, secured the entrances to the further dug-outs, thereby preventing the escape of the garrison, and was instrumental in the capture of a large number of prisoners.
- Private P. Gethins, Royal Highlanders. For conspicuous gallantry in action. On several occasions he carried messages under very heavy fire. He has on all occasions set a splendid example of coolness and courage.
- Sergeant J. W. Gladding, Hertfordshire Regiment. For conspicuous gallantry in action. He led his platoon with great gallantry, and himself accounted for many of the enemy. He set a splendid example throughout.
- Private J. Gray, Hertfordshire Regiment. For conspicuous gallantry in action. He displayed great courage and initiative when in charge of fourteen enemy prisoners who endeavoured to escape, and finally brought them back to battalion headquarters.
- Company Sergeant Major G. S. Gregory, Hertfordshire Regiment. For conspicuous gallantry in action. He arranged the water and ration supplies, and materially assisted in the evacuation of the wounded. He set a splendid example of courage and coolness throughout.
- Sergeant E. L. Hall, Cheshire Regiment. For conspicuous gallantry in action. He led his men to the first objective with great gallantry. Later, although wounded, he continued to lead his men until exhausted.
- Acting Corporal W. Hibbert, Hertfordshire Regiment. For conspicuous gallantry in action. He displayed great courage and determination in holding an advanced bombing post against very superior numbers of the enemy.
- Private J. H. Hobbs, Hertfordshire Regiment. For conspicuous gallantry in action. Although twice wounded he continued to go forward displaying great courage and determination. He was again wounded.
- Private H. Howard, Cambridgeshire Regiment. For conspicuous gallantry in action. With a few men he rushed an enemy machine gun, captured the gun and several prisoners. He set a fine example of coolness and courage
- Private W. James, East Surrey Regiment. For conspicuous gallantry in action. On several occasions he carried messages under very heavy fire, and led forward men who had lost their leaders. He set a splendid example of courage and coolness throughout.
- Sergeant A. H. Jones, Worcestershire Regiment. For conspicuous gallantry in action. He led the left group of a fighting patrol which successfully raided an enemy trench. He has previously done fine work.
- Sergeant J. W. Jordan, Cambridgeshire Regiment. For conspicuous gallantry in action. He led his half company forward and organised the position with great courage and skill. He has at all times set a fine example.
- Private C. Kerr, Royal Scots. For conspicuous gallantry in action. He, with another man, displayed great courage and initiative in retaking a trench and inflicted considerable loss on the enemy.
- Sergeant J. W. Kimberley, Royal Warwickshire Regiment. For conspicuous gallantry in action. With a few men he held an exposed post for two days and nights against very superior numbers of the enemy. He set a splendid example throughout.
- Private J. Loftus, Cheshire Regiment. For conspicuous gallantry in action. He took charge of a party and led them down an enemy trench, bombing, and clearing the dug-outs. He set a splendid example, throughout.
- Sergeant G. Y. Macfarlane, Royal Highlanders. For conspicuous gallantry in action. He, with another Sergeant, reorganised some men and attacked an enemy bombing post, driving the enemy out and rescuing a wounded officer who had been captured. Later, although himself wounded, he continued to remain at his post.
- Sergeant W. J. Marshall, Royal Field Artillery. For conspicuous gallantry in action. When his battery was heavily shelled he displayed great courage and determination in handling and encouraging his men. He has at all times set a fine example.
- Sergeant A. B. Matthew, Gordon Highlanders. For conspicuous gallantry in action. On. two occasions he displayed great courage and determination on patrol, and obtained most valuable information. He has on many occasions done fine work
- Corporal W. McNally, South Lancashire Regiment. For conspicuous gallantry in action. He-assumed command of his company and consolidated the position won. Later, he withdrew his men with great skill to a strong point in advance of the front line.
- Private M. McSkimming, Royal Scots. For conspicuous gallantry in action. He, with another man, displayed great courage and initiative in retaking a trench and inflicted considerable loss on the enemy.
- Lance Corporal J. Murphy, York and Lancaster Regiment. For conspicuous gallantry in action. He-rendered invaluable assistance in getting and torpedo into position under the enemy's wire, and although severely wounded continued at his work.
- Private T. Myles, Royal Highlanders. For conspicuous gallantry in action. On-several occasions he carried messages under-very heavy fire. He has at all times set a splendid example of coolness and courage.
- Sergeant W. H. Nash, Gloucestershire Regiment. For conspicuous gallantry in action. He displayed great courage and initiative in-leading an attack against the enemy. Later, he rendered most valuable assistance in the captured line.
- Lance Sergeant G. E. Partridge, North Lancashire Regiment. For conspicuous gallantry in action. He-led his men in the attack with great courage and determination. Later, he carried out a dangerous patrol in daylight. He set a fine example throughout.
- Private H. Pugh, Gloucestershire Regiment. For conspicuous gallantry in action. He led a party with great gallantry against an enemy machine gun, and himself shot three of the gun team. He has previously done-fine work.
- Lance Corporal C. S. Quinn, Depot, Bedfordshire Regiment. For conspicuous gallantry in action. He rallied his platoon, and in the face of heavy fire from an enemy strong point at close range he continued to encourage his men after having been severely wounded.
- Lance Corporal R. Read, South Lancashire Regiment. For conspicuous gallantry in action. He repeatedly carried messages over the open under heavy fire. Later, he rendered most valuable services in collecting and in consolidating the position.
- Private A. Shaw, Machine Gun Corps. For conspicuous gallantry in action. He, with an officer and a N.C.O. took a machine gun forward, and successfully broke up an enemy counter-attack. He set a fine example of courage and initiative.
- Sergeant J. Slater, Royal Scots. For conspicuous gallantry in action. He displayed great courage and determination when in charge of a party of bombers, who drove the enemy out of a trench and recaptured a machine gun. Later, he carried out a valuable reconnaissance.
- Private A. W. Spencer, Gloucestershire Regiment. For conspicuous gallantly in action. He took out a machine gun in front of the newly captured line to enfilade the enemy's position and maintained his position. He set a fine example of coolness and courage.
- Sergeant G. Stewart, Royal Field Artillery. For conspicuous gallantry in action. He displayed great courage and initiative in leading several, wagons to a place of safety under heavy fire, undoubtedly saving many casualties. On another occasion he rendered valuable assistance in rescuing three buried men.
- Acting Sergeant S. A. Stych, Nottinghamshire & Derbyshire Regiment. For conspicuous gallantry in action. Having cleared his part of the enemy trench, he led his platoon against a party of the enemy who were sniping from dug-outs. He bombed them into their dug-outs and guarded the entrances, thereby greatly assisting in the capture of 150 prisoners.
- Company Sergeant Major W. Templeton, Cameron Highlanders. For conspicuous gallantry in action. He collected a party of men, and by his initiative was able to hold up the enemy's advance, rendering most valuable service at a critical period.
- Company Sergeant Major George Theedom, East Surrey Regiment. For conspicuous gallantry in action. He displayed great courage and initiative when in charge of carrying parties under heavy fire. He was wounded.
- Sergeant R. B. Trotter, Royal Army Medical Corps. For conspicuous gallantry and devotion to duty. He displayed great courage and determination when in charge of a number of stretcher-bearer squads. On several occasions he personally tended the wounded under very heavy fire.
- Gunner H. D. Ward, Royal Field Artillery, attached Trench Mortar Battery. For conspicuous gallantry in action. He displayed great courage and rendered most valuable services throughout the operations. On one occasion he went out and carried back many wounded men.
- Corporal H. Waterton, Hertfordshire Regiment. For conspicuous gallantry in action. He displayed great courage and skill in handling his machine guns under heavy fire, and greatly assisted in repulsing several hostile attacks.
- Private G. Watson, Northumberland Fusiliers. For conspicuous gallantry in action. He laid a cable under heavy fire, displaying great courage and determination. He has previously done fine work.
- Private A. W. Wayman, Cambridgeshire Regiment. For conspicuous gallantry in action. He carried a most important message under very heavy fire. He has previously done fine work.
- Acting Sergeant W. Webster, Royal Highlanders. For conspicuous gallantry in action. He displayed great courage and determination in entering an enemy dug-out and taking one officer and 20 men prisoners. Later, he commanded the right half of his company with great skill
- Private Harold Whowell, North Lancashire Regiment. For conspicuous gallantry-in action. On several occasions he attended wounded men under very heavy fire. He set a fine example of courage and coolness throughout.
- Corporal G. A. Willey, Hertfordshire Regiment. For conspicuous gallantry in action. He showed marked courage when clearing enemy dug-outs, and himself accounted for several of the enemy. He has at all times set a fine example.
- Corporal D. Wilson, Argyll & Sutherland Highlanders. For conspicuous gallantry in action. He carried out some very difficult reconnaissance work under continuous hostile fire, setting a fine example of fearlessness and courage.
- Private F. Wright, North Lancashire Regiment. For conspicuous gallantry in action. In spite of resistance he, single-handed, captured 20 of the enemy, including an officer, and brought them back to battalion headquarters.

Australian Imperial Force

- Temp Sergeant P. D. Jones, Australian Infantry. For conspicuous gallantry in action. He single-handed attacked and killed three of the enemy. Later, he displayed great courage and initiative in assisting to lead his company to the second objective. He set a splendid example throughout.

==== Awarded a Bar to the Distinguished Conduct Medal (DCM*) ====
- Corporal W. Hay, Northumberland Fusiliers. For conspicuous gallantry in action. He worked continuously for seven days under intense fire repairing a most important telephone wire which was repeatedly being cut. He has on many previous occasions done fine work.

=== Meritorious Service Medal (MSM) ===
- Staff Sergeant (Acting Staff Sergeant Major) W. J. Adcock, Army Service Corps
- Company Sergeant Major F. H. Alder, King's Royal Rifle Corps.
- Corporal J. E. Aldridge, Royal Army Medical Corps.
- Staff Sergeant Major A. Allen, Army Service Corps
- Private R. Allen, Dragoon Guards
- Corporal (Acting Staff Quartermaster Sergeant) S. Allen, Army Service Corps
- Staff Sergeant H. B. Alloway, Royal Army Medical Corps
- Staff Sergeant Major (Acting 1st Class Staff Sergeant Major) P. Andress, Army Service Corps
- Quartermaster Sergeant A. W. Andrews, Middlesex Regiment
- Company Sergeant Major (Acting Sergeant Major) G. F. Archibald, Royal Scots attached Entrenching Battalion
- Staff Sergeant Major E. Arnold, Army Service Corps
- Staff Quartermaster Sergeant (Acting Staff Sergeant Major) C. H. Atkins, Army Service Corps
- Corporal (Acting Sergeant Major) A. Avery, Shropshire Light Infantry, attached Entrenching Battalion
- Company Sergeant Major F. J. D. Ayres, Machine Gun Corps
- Quartermaster Sergeant (Artillery Clerk) (Acting Battery Sergeant Major) J. A. Barkham, Royal Artillery
- Mechanist Staff Sergeant (Acting Mechanist Sergeant Major) G. Bass, Army Service Corps
- Lance Corporal (Acting Sergeant) H. J. Bate, Army Service Corps
- Staff Quartermaster Sergeant. A. V. Baxter, Army Service Corps
- 2nd Corporal D. Baxter, Royal Engineers
- Private H. G. Beatton, Royal Army Medical Corps
- Private T. R. Begley, Royal Army Medical Corps
- Sergeant A. W. Bendall, Royal Engineers
- Private J. M. Bennett, West Riding Regiment
- Private T. Bentley, Royal Munster Fusiliers
- Lance Corporal E. Bibby, Dragoon Guards, attached Military Mounted Police
- Sergeant G. H. Bicknell, Royal Flying Corps
- Corporal S. Billyeald, Dragoon Guards
- Sergeant Major G. H. Bishop, Rifle Brigade, attached Egyptian Army.
- Battery Sergeant Major G. W. Blackman, Royal Field Artillery
- Lance Corporal W. Boddington, London Regiment
- Quartermaster Sergeant E. W. Bond, Coldstream Guards
- Foreman of Works Staff Sergeant A. E. Bone, Royal Engineers
- Quartermaster Sergeant (Acting Sergeant Major) B. Booth, Royal Irish Rifles, attached G.H.Q.
- Private (Acting Corporal) H. R. Bower, Army Service Corps
- Engineer Colour-Sergeant T. W. Bowes, Royal Engineers
- Private (Lance Corporal) W. H. Boyd, Military Mounted Police
- Private A. Bradley, Army Ordnance Corps
- Sergeant Major L. J. Brain, Royal Army Medical Corps
- Corporal F. A. W. Braine, Royal Flying Corps
- Battery Sergeant Major W. T. Brierly, Royal Field Artillery
- Superintending Clerk W. P. Britton, Royal Engineers
- Sergeant J. T. Brown, Devon Regiment
- Sergeant W. G. Brown, Seaforth Highlanders
- Sergeant W. H. Brown, Royal Engineers
- Acting Company Sergeant Major Instructor V. Bullen, Gymnastic Staff
- Staff Sergeant Major A. V. Burd, Army Service Corps
- Armament Staff Sergeant (Acting Armament Sergeant Major) W. Burden, Army Ordnance Corps
- Sergeant (Acting Company Sergeant Major) A. E. Burfitt, Royal Engineers
- Company Sergeant Major H. J. Burridge, Royal Engineers
- 2nd Corporal (Acting Sergeant Engineer Clerk.) A. T. Burt, Royal Engineers
- Company Sergeant Major F.J. Burton, Army Service Corps
- Engineer Clerk Quartermaster Sergeant (Acting Superintending Clerk) H. Butler, Royal Engineers
- Company Sergeant Major J. W. Byatt, Royal Engineers
- Armament Sergeant Major J. Byrom, Army Ordnance Corps
- Sergeant M. Cairns, Coldstream Guards
- Private (Acting Corporal) W. G. Callander, Army Service Corps
- 321 Quartermaster Sergeant (local rank Sergeant Major) J. Campbell, Irish Guards, attached Egyptian Army
- 1st Class Staff Sergeant Major A. J. Carey, Army Service Corps
- 1st Class. Staff Sergeant Major J. W. Carr, Army Service Corps
- Company Sergeant Major. T. Cash, Manchester Regiment
- Sergeant R. Catley, Hampshire Regiment
- Battery Sergeant Major C. Canter, G. Battery, Royal Horse Artillery
- Staff Sergeant (Acting Sergeant Major) H. L. Chavasse, Army Veterinary Corps
- Air Mechanic 1st Class E. E. Childs, Royal Flying Corps
- Sergeant Major (Artillery Clerk) P. W. Clarke, Royal Artillery
- Sergeant Major (Acting Superintending Clerk) J. W. E. Clemons, Royal Engineers
- Battery Sergeant Major H. J. Coates, Royal Field Artillery
- Private (Acting Sergeant) C. Cole, Army Veterinary Corps
- Staff Sergeant H. W. Cole, Ary Service Corps
- Corporal (Acting Sergeant) J. Cole, Royal Engineers
- Farrier Corporal (Acting Farrier Sergeant) B. H. Collett, Army Service Corps
- Superintending Clerk A. Collie, G.H.Q., Royal Engineers
- Staff Sergeant Farrier T. C. Collins, Royal Horse Artillery
- Sapper (Acting 2nd Corporal) R. M. Connell, Royal Engineers Special Reserve
- Superindending Clerk F. Cook, Royal Marines
- Quartermaster Sergeant (Acting Superintending Clerk) J. Cook, Scots Guards, attached G.H.Q.
- Sergeant J. C. Cooper, Royal Flying Corps
- Sergeant J. L. Copland, Royal Engineers
- Quartermaster Sergeant W. H. Corbett, Coldstream Guards
- Corporal (Acting Company Quartermaster Sergeant) S. Coulson, Army Service Corps
- Battery Sergeant Major H. S. Cowland, Royal Field Artillery
- Driver (acting Corporal) E. V. Cox, Army Service Corps
- Battery Sergeant Major J. Crawford, Royal Garrison Artillery
- Private W. L. Crocker, Devon Regiment
- Acting Lance Corporal G. Crow, Middlesex Regiment
- Battery Sergeant Major F. C. Curtis, Royal Field Artillery
- Private (Acting Lance Corporal) W. J. Daires, Army Service Corps
- Corporal (Acting Sergeant) W. R. Dandy, Royal Flying Corps.
- Engineer Clerk Quartermaster Sergeant F. G. L. Davey, Royal Engineers
- Mechanist Sergeant Major G. Dawson, Army Service Corps
- Staff Sergeant Major (Acting 1st Class Staff Sergeant Major) W. H. Dean, Army Service Corps
- Sergeant Major (Artillery Clerk) S. H. Dexter, Royal Garrison Artillery
- Staff Sergeant Major W. Dible, Army Service Corps
- Driver J. Draper, Army Service Corps
- Private (Acting Sergeant) G. Dunlop, Royal Army Medical Corps
- Flight Sergeant C. W. Durman, Royal Flying Corps
- Engineering Ledger Keeper and Storeman Quartermaster Sergeant A. M. Durrant, Royal Engineers
- Lance Corporal (Acting 2nd Corporal) N. A. Eaton, Royal Engineers
- Superintending Clerk J. Edington, Royal Engineers
- Battery Quartermaster Sergeant G. R. Edmondson, Royal Field Artillery
- Staff Sergeant (Acting Staff Quartermaster Sergeant) G. T. Elliott, Army Service Corps
- Mechanist Staff Sergeant S. Elliott, Supply Column, Army Service Corps
- Sergeant W. C. Elliott, Army Service Corps
- 2nd Corporal (Acting Company Sergeant Major) C. J. R. Elms, Royal Engineers
- Private (Acting Sergeant) A. Emerson, Army Service Corps
- Sergeant T. W. Emmerson, Army Veterinary Corps
- Private (Acting Corporal) W. Evans, Royal Army Medical Corps
- Quartermaster Sergeant P. H. Faulkner, London Regiment
- Quartermaster Sergeant W. Fawcett, Grenadier Guards
- Sub-Conductor (Acting Conductor) S. A. Fenn, Army Ordnance Corps
- Sergeant (Acting Staff Sergeant) G. W. Feurer, Army Pay Corps
- Sergeant (Acting Staff Quartermaster Sergeant) E. W. H. Fillmore, Army Service Corps
- Sergeant R. H. G. Filtness, Army Service Corps
- Quartermaster Sergeant (local Sergeant Major) G. Fitzgerald, North Staffordshire Regiment, attached Egyptian Army
- Colour Sergeant R. S. Flint, King's Royal Rifle Corps
- Staff Sergeant C. D. Fowles, Army Service Corps
- Sergeant (Acting Sergeant Major) E. Fowles, Royal Flying Corps
- Sergeant Major (Artillery Clerk) J. B. Fox, Royal Artillery
- Engineering Clerk Quartermaster Sergeant H. B. J. Franklin, Royal Engineers
- Staff Quartermaster Sergeant W. J. Franks, Army Service Corps
- Engineering Clerk Sergeant C. Freshwater, Royal Engineer
- Sergeant (Acting Staff Sergeant) G. E. Gaches, Army Service Corps
- Lance Corporal P. Gaines, Northumberland Fusiliers
- Company Quartermaster Sergeant H. Gales, Middlesex Regiment
- Company Sergeant Major C. Gilbert, Royal Engineers
- Regimental Corporal Major W. Glading, Royal Horse Guards
- Staff Sergeant C. Goldsmark, Royal Army Medical Corps
- Sergeant (Acting Company Sergeant Major) J. H. Goldie, Scots Rifles
- Lance Sergeant (Acting Sergeant Major) J. H. Graham, Grenadier Guards, attached Entrenching Battalion
- Sergeant N. Green, York & Lancaster Regiment
- Staff Sergeant Major A. Greenwood, Army Pay Corps
- Sergeant J. C. Grigg, Army Service Corps
- Sergeant (Acting Mechanist Staff Sergeant) W. Hales, Army Service Corps
- Staff Sergeant Major (Acting Staff Sergeant Major) G. Harrison, Army Service Corps
- Battery Sergeant Major F. Hatch, Royal Field Artillery
- Sergeant W. W. Hatfield, Army Service Corps
- Sergeant (Acting Sergeant Major) W. C. Hayward, Royal Flying Corps
- Trooper (Acting Lance Corporal) J. Heeley, King Edward's Horse.
- Staff Sergeant Major (Acting 1st Class Staff Sergeant Major) S. Hellier, Army Service Corps
- Sergeant H. A. Hemming, Royal Flying Corps
- Sergeant (Artillery Clerk) A. O. Hemus, Royal Artillery
- Corporal E. E. J. Hennessy, Army Service Corps
- Lance Corporal W. Herbert, Hampshire Regiment
- Sergeant Major N. Herdman, Seaforth Highlanders
- Private (Acting Staff Sergeant) J. E. Hickman, Army Service Corps
- Sergeant Major F. Hill, Hussars
- Engineer Ledgerkeeper & Staff Quartermaster Sergeant. A. C. Hills, Royal Engineers
- Sergeant (Acting Regimental Quartermaster Sergeant) A. Hobbs, R.D.
- Sergeant W. Holden, Hussars
- Staff Quartermaster Sergeant M. Holywood, Army Service Corps
- Sub-Conductor (Acting Conductor) N. Honey, Army Ordnance Corps
- Lance Corporal J. Hood, Kings Royal Rifle Corps
- Flight Sergeant H. I. Hooper, Royal Flying Corps
- Lance Corporal (Acting Sergeant) H. J. Horner, Royal Engineers
- Air Mechanic T. Horton, Royal Flying Corps
- Flight Sergeant C. J. Howard, Royal Flying Corps
- Lance Sergeant G. W. Howell, Roya Welch Fusiliers, attached Entrenching Battalion
- Company Sergeant Major A. Hudson, Welsh Regiment
- Sergeant (Acting Staff Sewgeant) E. A. Hughes, Army Service Corps
- Staff Sergeant Major (Acting Ist Class Staff Sergeant Major) P. Hulbert, Army Service Corps
- Quartermaster Sergeant J. Humphreys, Royal Engineers
- Staff Sergeant. (Acting Sergeant Major) T. H. Hunt, Military Provost Staff Corps.
- Company Sergeant Major (Acting Quartermaster Sergeant) M. S. Hunter, Postal Section, Royal Engineers, Special Reserve
- Company Sergeant Major (Acting Sergeant Major) E. Hurvid, Devonshire Regiment, attached Entrenching Battalion
- Staff Sergeant Major (Acting Regimental Sergeant Major) T. Hyett, Dragoon Guards, P.S., Northamptonshire Yeomanry
- Corporal G. S. Iddison, Royal Army Medical Corps
- Lance Corporal H. Inglis, Gordon Highlanders
- Acting Sergeant W. L. Inglis, Cameron Highlanders
- Sergeant (Acting Staff Sergeant Major) A. F. Jamieson, Army Service Corps
- Private J. Jervis, Army Service Corps
- Engineer Ledgerkeeper and Quartermaster Sergeant H. J. Jones, Royal Engineers
- Armourer Staff Sergeant W. Joines, Army Ordnance Corps, attached Egyptian Army.
- Acting Lance Corporal T. Keeley, Manchester Regiment
- 1st Class Staff Sergeant Major M. Keenan, Army Service Corps
- Company Sergeant Major (Acting Sergeant Major) J. T. Keene, Rifle Brigade
- Company Sergeant Major H. Kendall, Army Service Corps.
- Sergeant (Acting Staff Sergeant Major) J. Keyes, Army Service Corps
- Sergeant G. Kindness, Royal Engineers
- Private F. King, Hampshire Regiment
- Staff Sergeant (Acting Staff Sergeant Major) H. J. Knight, Army Service Corps
- Acting Company Sergeant Major Instructor A. G. Lammas, Army Gym Staff
- Military Mechanist Acting Staff Sergeant H. W. Lane, Royal Engineers
- Corporal (Acting Staff Sergeant) H. T. Langstone, Army Service Corps
- Sergeant (Acting Sergeant Major) C. T. Layland, Royal Scots, attached Entrenching Battalion
- 1st Class Staff Sergeant Major E. J. Le Blancq, Army Service Corps
- Engineer Sergeant Quartermaster Sergeant W. E. Ledden, Royal Engineers
- Armament Staff Sergeant (Acting Armament Sergeant Major) W. J. Le Petit, Army Ordnance Corps
- Staff Quartermaster Sergeant H. C. Lester, Army Service Corps
- Quartermaster Sergeant (Acting Sergeant Major) F. W. Leverett, Royal Fusiliers, attached Machine Gun Section
- Sergeant (Acting Staff Sergeant) F. C. Lisle, Army Service Corps
- Armament Staff Sergeant (Acting Armament Sergeant Major) G. Littleton, Army Ordnance Corps
- Lance Corporal E. H. Longshaw, Royal Engineers
- Private (Acting Lance Corporal) F. H. Ludlow, Royal Army Medical Corps
- Lance Corporal F. MacFarlane, Royal Highlanders, attached Royal Engineers
- Farrier Quartermaster Corporal J. K. Mackenzie, Life Guards
- Conductor A. C. W. Maile, Army Ordnance Corps
- Company Quartermaster Sergeant. H. E. Mallows, Royal Engineers
- Armament Staff Sergeant L. E. Markey, Army Ordnance Corps, attached Royal Field Artillery
- Conductor A. W. Martin, Army Ordnance Corps
- Lance Corporal (Acting Corporal) O. Martin, Royal Engineers, Special Reserve
- Acting Company Sergeant Major (Artillery Clerk) E. P. Mason, Royal Garrison Artillery
- Company Quartermaster Sergeant W. W. Mathie, Army Service Corps
- Squadron Quartermaster Sergeant B. J. S. McFie, Q.O., Oxfordshire Hussars Yeomanry
- Private J. Mclnnes, Cameron Highlanders
- Corporal J. McMorran, Royal Scots
- Staff Quartermaster Sergeant. F. McNicoll, Army Pay Corps
- Battery Sergeant Major T. McVeigh, Motor Machine Gun Service.
- Private E. J. Meiklejohn, Royal Army Medical Corps
- Engineer Clerk Quartermaster Sergeant F. T. Merrick, Royal Engineers
- Quartermaster Sergeant (Acting Sergeant Major) (Armourers Crew) T. Metherell, Royal Artillery, Clerks Section.
- Acting Sergeant Major L. H. Metz, Royal Flying Corps
- Farrier Sergeant C. G. Miller, Riyak Field Artillery
- Engineer Clerk Sergeant (Acting Engineer Clerk Quartermaster Sergeant) P. E. C. Miller, Royal Engineers
- Company Sergeant Major L. S. Mirame, Army Service Corps
- Staff Quartermaster Sergeant A. E. Mirfie, Army Service Corps
- Private (Acting Sergeant) T. Mitchinson, Army Service Corps
- Company Quartermaster Sergeant, now Quartermaster Sergeant (Orderly Room Sergeant) J. C. Moon, Royal Warwickshire Regiment
- Corporal P. S. Moore, South Wales Borderers
- Military Mechanical and Electrical Sergeant Major W. M. N. Morecombe, Royal Engineers
- Fitter J. F. Morris, Royal Field Artillery
- Sergeant (Acting Company Sergeant Major) H. J. H. Moses, Royal Engineers
- Lance Sergeant E. Moss, Royal Army Medical Corps
- Gunner F. T. Moulton, Royak Garrison Artillery
- Sub Conductor. A. J. Muir, Army Ordnance Corps, attached Egyptian Army.
- Acting Sergeant Major 0. Mullen, Royal Flying Corps
- Corporal (Acting Sergeant) M. Mullen, Army Service Corps
- Quartermaster Sergeant D. A. Murray, East Lancashire Regiment
- Lance Corporal J. Murray, Army Service Corps
- Corporal E. E. Nash, Grenadier Guards, attached Guards Divisional Signal Company
- Company Sergeant Major J. E. B. Nealon, Royal Engineers
- Quartermaster Sergeant (Acting Sergeant Major) J. E. Newton, Royal Army Medical Corps
- Corporal E. Norton, Army Service Corps
- 7685 Drill Sergeant (Acting Sergeant Major) F. Oakley, Grenadier Guards, attached Entrenching Battalion
- Sergeant. P. O'Brien, Royal Engineers
- Staff Sergeant (Acting Staff Sergeant Major) R. O'Brien, Army Service Corps
- Foreman of Works Quartermaster Sergeant J. W. O'Hanlon, Royal Engineers
- Farrier Quartermaster Sergeant A. E. Oliver, Hussars
- Staff Sergeant J. J. O'Shea, Army Service Corps
- Sub-Conductor (Acting Conductor) A. Osman, Army Ordnance Corps
- Private (Acting Sergeant) F. H. Padfield, Army Service Corps
- Driver (Acting Corporal) T. E. Page, Army Service Corps
- Regimental Sergeant Major J. Parkin, Yorkshire Hussars Yeomanry
- Acting Sergeant Major W. T. Payton, Rifle Brigade, attached London Regiment
- Armament Sergeant Major W. R. O. Pearce, Armuy Ordnace Corps
- Quartermaster Sergeant (Acting Staff Sergeant Major) E. Pearson, Worcestershire Regiment, attached G.H.Q
- Staff Sergeant (Acting Sergeant Major) W. C. Pepperell, Army Veterinary Corps
- Sergeant W. T. Perkins, Royal Army Medical Corps
- Sergeant J. Pickering, Manchester Regiment
- Company Sergeant Major S. Pickering, Postal Service, Royal Engineers
- Ist Class Staff Sergeant Major F. Pilkington, Army Service Corps attached G.H.Q.
- Quartermaster Sergeant. C. H. Pithers, York & Lancaster Regiment
- Sergeant R. Pollock, Royal Army Medical Corps
- Staff Sergeant (Acting Staff Sergeant Major) W. J. Pope, Army Service Corps
- Quartermaster Sergeant (Acting Superintending Clerk) W. W. Popperwell, Royal Engineers
- Corporal (Acting Sergeant) E. Poulton, Royal Engineers
- Staff Sergeant H. M. Prince, Royal Army Medical Corps
- Sergeant (Acting Staff Sergeant Major) C. Prince-Cox, Army Service Corps
- Sergeant C. W. Purchase, London Regiment
- Staff Sergeant Major R. Rands, Army Service Corps
- 1st Class Staff Sergeant Major W. J. Ranson, Army Service Corps
- Lance Corporal (Acting 2nd Corporal) C. Redley, Royal Engineers
- Company Quartermaster Sergeant T. J. Rees, Army Service Corps
- Staff Quartermaster Sergeant (Acting Staff Sergeant Major) H. E. Reimann, Army Service Corps
- Sapper (Acting Lance Corporal) R. W. Reynard, Royal Engineers
- Artillery Corporal R. J. Reynolds, Royal Engineers
- Armament Staff Sergeant G. H. Richardson, Army Ordnance Corps, attached Royal Field Artillery
- Quartermaster Sergeant W. R. Ricketts, Essex Regiment
- Private (Acting Mechanist Staff Sergeant (A.) J. A. Ritchie, Army Service Corps attached M. Ambulance Convoy.
- Superintending Clerk F. W. Roberts, Royal Engineers
- Company Sergeant Major (Acting Sergeant Major) A. Robertson, Gordon Highlanders
- Sub Conductor (Acting Conductor) C. E. W. Robinson, Army Ordnance Corps
- 2nd Corporal (Acting Sub Conductor) 0. D. Rolland, Army Ordnance Corps
- Sergeant Major W. G. R. Rouse, Royal Army Medical Corps
- Sergeant (Acting Staff Quartermaster Sergeant) W. J. Rowe, Army Service Corps
- Corporal B. A. Rutton, Army Service Corps, attached London Field Ambulance
- Staff Sergeant Major (Acting 1st Class Staff Sergeant Major) F. Rye, Army Service Corps
- Sergeant V. W. Sagon, Royal Engineers
- Private (Acting Sergeant) J. Sampson, Army Veterinary Corps
- Lance Sergeant (Acting Staff Quartermaster Sergeant) C. J. Saunders, Army Service Corps
- Staff Quartermaster Sergeant A. E. Savage, Army Service Corps
- Private G. F. Scott, Dragoon Guards
- Conductor H. Seyde, Army Ordnance Corps
- Private H. E. Sharpe, Liverpool Regiment
- Lance Corporal (Acting Company Sergeant Major) P. Sharpe, Army Service Corps (Mechanical Transport)
- Company Quartermaster Sergeant (Acting Company Sergeant Major) E. J. Sheeby, Royal Anglesey Engineers, Special Reserve.
- Sergeant Major E. J. Shelley, Middlesex Regiment
- Quartermaster Sergeant E. Shepherd, Royal Army Medical Corps
- Sergeant W. Sherman, Royal Engineers
- Private (Acting Sergeant) F. Silver, Army Service Corps
- 1st Class Air Mechanic O. S. Singleton, Royal Flying Corps
- Flight Sergeant E. F. Smith, Royal Flying Corps
- Corporal (Acting Company Sergeant Major) E. S. Smith, Army Service Corps
- Quarteremaster Sergeant W. Smith, Yorkshire Regiment, attached Egyptian Army.
- Quartermaster Sergeant (Acting Sergeant Major) H. Soady, Royal Army Medical Corps
- Staff Sergeant (Acting Staff Sergeant Major) V. C. Soggee, Army Service Corps
- Engineering Clerk Sergeant (Acting Supertindending Clerk) Sergeant C. H. Soppitt, attached Royal Engineers
- Quartermaster Sergeant A. P. Spackman, Royal Army Medical Corps
- Sergeant H. V. Spraggs, Army Ordnance Corps, attached Egyptian Army
- Company Sergeant Major (Acting Sergeant Major) T. J. Staines (formerly Coldstream Guards)
- Sergeant H. W. Steward, Divisional Engineer, Royal Engineers
- Sergeant S. M. Steward, Royal Field Artillery
- Private (Actinbg Mechanist Staff Sergeant) H. Stewart, Army Service Corps
- Acting Sergeant Major J. S. R. Stewart, Rifle Brigade
- Gunner (Acting Fitter) P. E. Stilton, Royal Field Artillery
- Sergeant (Acting Company Sergeant Major) F. W. Stokes, Royal Engineers
- Corporal A. P. Stone, Army Service Corps
- Sergeant J. Stott. Military Mounted Police, attached Cavalry Division
- Sergeant H. B. Stringer, Royal Flying Corps
- Sergeant R. M. Summerfield, Royal Engineers
- Corporal (Acting Company Sergeant Major) A. C. Swain, Royal Engineers
- Flight Sergeant R. J. Tallyn, Royal Flying Corps
- Corporal (Acting Staff Sergeant) S. H. Taylor, Army Service Corps
- Squadron Sergeant Major. W. Taylor, Machine Gun Corps
- Lance Corporal (Acting Sergeant) J. W. Teasdale, Military Foot Police
- Sergeant P. Tew, Bedfordshire Regiment
- Company Sergeant Major T. W. Tubby, Royal Engineers
- Lance Corporal. A. Thomas, London Regiment
- Pioneer Sergeant W. Thomas, London Regiment
- Private (Acting Corporal) W. H. Thomas, Army Service Corps
- Staff Sergeant (Acting Staff Sergeant Major) R. Tindall, Army Service Corps
- Corporal (Acting Sergeant) B. Tinton, Army Service Corps
- Corporal (Acting Quartermaster Sergeant) W. Trump, Royal Engineers
- Staff Sergeant Major (Acting 1st Class Staff Sergeant Major) A. E. Tucker, Army Service Corps
- Corporal (Acting Sub-Conductor) M. Tully, Army Ordnance Corps
- Sergeant A. Turner, Royal Field Artillery
- Company Quartermaster Sergeant G. E. Unstead, Middlesex Regiment
- Private H. Viner, Army Service Corps
- Sergeant Major E. Wade, Manchester Regiment
- Battery Sergeant Major C. E. Walkley, Royal Artillery
- Smith-Gunner (Acting Fitter Staff Sergeant) P. H. Walton, Royal Garriuson Artillery
- Flight Sergeant L. Wardley, Royal Flying Corps
- Sergeant A. H. Wardrop, Royal Engineers
- Forman of Works Quartermaster Sergeant A. Watkins, Royal Engineers
- Lance Corporal (Acting Sub-Conductor) A. V. Watsham, Army Ordnance Corps
- Sergeant T. Watson, London Regiment
- Air Mechanic 1st Class T. P. Watson, Royal Flying Corps
- Sub-Conductor R. T. Waugh, Miscellaneous List, Indian Army.
- Staff Sergeant Major J. H. Webster, Army Service Corps
- Battery Sergeant Major W. Weeks, Royal Field Artillery
- Company Sergeant Major R. E. Westerman, Royal Engineers
- Corporal A. White, Middlesex Regiment
- Squadron Sergeant Major F. White, Hussars
- Sergeant H. J. White, Reserve Army Signal Company
- Corporal Lance Sergeant W. A. Whittaker, Royal Army Medical Corps
- Sub-Conductor H.R. Willes, Army Ordnance Corps, attached Egyptian Army
- Company Quartermaster Sergeant E. J. Williams, Royal Engineers
- Corporal (Acting Staff Sergeant) G. Williams, Army Service Corps
- Sergeant W. T. Williams, Royal Army Medical Corps
- Staff Sergeant (Acting Superintending Clerk) J. E. Willsher, Establishment for Engineer Services, Royal Engineers
- Fitter Corporal A. J. Wilson, Royal Field Artillery
- Sergeant F. A. Woodall, Royal Flying Corps
- Quartermaster Sergeant (Acting Superintending Clerk) G. A. Woolgar, Royal Engineers (attached G.H.Q.)
- Conductor H. T. Woolner, Army Ordnance Corps
- Private (Acting Sub-Conductor) D. Worsfold, Army Ordnance Corps
- Farrier Quartermaster Sergeant J. Wyvill, Lancers
- Private (Acting Corporal) A. V. Yarham, Army Service Corps

Australian Imperial Force

- Company Sergeant Major C. E. Browne, Australian Infantry
- Warrant Officer N. Cockfield, Australian Infantry
- Sergeant B. Conole, Australian Infantry
- Sergeant E. Ellis, Australian Medical Corps
- Sergeant-Cook A. G. Gibson, Australian Infantry
- Company Quartermaster Sergeant N. A. Kent, Australian Infantry
- Sergeant J. M. Lyons, Australian Infantry
- Staff Sergeant C.G. Schroder, Australian Infantry
- Sergeant G. Scott, H.Q., Australian Imperial Force, formerly Australian Infantry
- Sergeant J. E. S. Stevens, Australian Engineers
- Lance Corporal S.R. Tevelein, Australian Infantry
- Bombardier G. C. Watson, Australian Artillery

Canadian Contingent

- Battery Sergeant Major G. A. Biddiscombe, Canadian Divisional Ammunition Column, Canadian Artillery
- Quartermaster Sergeant W. G. Campbell, Pioneer Battalion, Canadian Infantry
- Corporal (Acting Sergeant) W. H. Crothy, Canadian Infantry
- Sergeant Major J. F. Cummins, Canadian Corps of Military Staff Clerks, Canadian Army Corps, H.Q.
- Sergeant N. J. L. Davy, Canadian Infantry
- Sergeant C.B. Elliott, Canadian Engineers
- Sergeant H. Ellis, Pioneer Battalion, Canadian Infantry
- Quartermaster Sergeant (Armament Artificer) G. H. Fairlie, Canadian Ordnance Corp, attached Canadian Field Artillery
- Sergeant C.T. Fitzpatrick, Canadian Infantry
- Sergeant A. McQ. Gibson, Canadian Army Medical Corps
- Quartermaster Sergeant G. B. W. Goodall, Canadian Infantry
- Sub-Conductor W. G. Hale, Canadian Ordnance Corps
- Staff Sergeant F. King, Canadian Army Service Corps
- Private (Acting Sergeant) H. M. Lewis, Canadian Engineers
- Sergeant C. A. Lumb, Canadian Army Service Corps
- Sergeant W. R. Lunnis, Canadian Infantry
- Acting Company Sergeant Major D. V. McPherson, Canadian Postal Corps
- Private J. J. Nicholls, Canadian Army Medical Corps
- Sergeant Major C. W. Parker, Canadian Engineers
- Sergeant B. Singleton, Canadian Army Service Corps
- Corporal G. Walker, Canadian Army Service Corps
- Sergeant Major S.G. Webb, Canadian Artillery

New Zealand Force

- Sergeant J. N. Beattie, N.Z. Rifle Brigade
- Staff Sergeant D. Galbraith, N.Z. Brigade, H.Q.
- Sergeant H. A. Holz, Divisional H.Q., N.Z. Military Mounted Police
- Company Sergeant Major W. H. Simmons, N.Z. Ordnance Corps
- Sergeant Major A. S. Thompson, Auckland Regiment

=== Military Medal (MM) ===
- Louisa Nolan
- Florence Williams
- Corporal H. Brogan, Leinster Regiment
- Private H. Hagues, late Nottinghamshire & Derbyshire Regiment
- Sergeant A. McMaster, Royal Irish Fusiliers
- Private G. Parsons, Royal Dublin Fusiliers
- Sergeant G. R. Preece, Royal Dublin Fusiliers

=== Conspicuous Gallantry Medal (CGM) ===
In recognition of services in the Battle of Jutland —

- Colour Sergeant Abraham Spooner, Royal Marine Artillery. Second in command of the Marine detachment of HMS Warrior. After his guns were no longer required, he showed the greatest gallantry and initiative in rescuing wounded in dense smoke and gas fumes from Marines mess deck.
- Leading Stoker Thomas McGovern. Showed much courage in extinguishing a large fire, which could only be reached through a shell hole surrounded by intense heat, fumes and smoke. His behaviour was highly commendable.

=== Indian Order of Merit (IOM) ===
Second Class

- Sowar Udey Singh, Lancers
- Jemadar Zari Gul Khan, Cavalry
- Dafadar Nihal Singh, Cavalry
- Lance Dafadar Mutthra Singh, Cavalry
- Jemadar Abdul Rahim Khan, Lancers
- Sowar Indar Singh, Lancers
- Dafadar Harditt Singh, Jacobs Horse
- Sowar Julab Singh, Jodhpur Imperial Service Lancers
- Subadar Attar Khan, Punjabis

=== Indian Distinguished Service Medal (IDSM) ===
- Ressaidar Abdul Latf Khan, Lancers
- Jemadar Dhara Singh, Lancers, attached Machine Gun Squadron
- Kot Dafadar Ram-Pershad, Lancers
- Dafadar Jiwan Singh, Lancers
- Dafadar Mazar Ali Shah, Cavalry
- Jemadar Amir Singh, Cavalry
- Jemadar Bachittar Singh, Cavalry
- Dafadar Arjan Singh, Cavalry
- Quartermaster Dafadar Odey Chand, Cavalry
- Ward Orderly Abdul Wahas Khan, Cavalry, attached Sialkot Cavalry Field Ambulance
- Risaldar Hazura Singh, Lancers, attached Machine Gun Squadron
- Sowar Hashim Khan, Cavalry, attached Machine Gun Squadron
- Farrier Wali Mahomed Khan, Cavalry attached Machine Gun Squadron
- Kot Dafadar Khuda Baksh Khan, Lancers
- Dafadar Bhagwan Singh, Lancers
- Sowar Mahomed Sharif Khan, Lancers, attached Machine Gun Squadron
- Sowar Hidayat Khan, Lancers, attached Machine Gun Squadron
- Sowar Lall Singh, Lancers
- Havildar Taja Khan, Lancers, attached Royal Horse Artillery
- Ressaidar Ghulam Husain, Lancers
- Dafadar Gulbar Khan, Lancers
- Dafadar Mahan Singh, Lancers
- Risaldar Ali Sher Khan, Cavalry
- Risaldar Konsal Singh, Cavalry
- Salutri Major Ghulam Mahrub, Cavalry
- Dafadar Kasim Khan, Cavalry
- Dafadar Mahomed Zaman Khan, Cavalry
- NSowar Ward Orderly Sirdar Singh, Cavalry, attached Secunderabad Cavalry Field Ambulance
- Risaldar Azam Ali, Cavalry, attached Lancers
- Dafadar Sher Singh, Cavalry, attached Ambala Cavalry Field Ambulance
- Kot Dafadar Khadar Nawaz (Pack Store Dafadar), Cavalry, attached Secunderabad Cavalry Field Amb
- Risaldar Chanda Singh, Lancers
- Jemadar Mahan Singh, Lancers, attached Machine Gun Squadron
- Kot Dafadar Imdad All, Lancers, attached Army Veterinary Corps
- Kot Dafadar Lall Singh, Lancers
- Temp. Ressaidar Rewat Singh, Cavalry
- Dafadar Sabdal Khan, Cavalry
- Dafadar Ghulam Muhi-Ud-Din-Khan, Cavalry
- Lance Dafadar Allah-Ud-Din-Khan, Cavalry
- Acting Lance Dafadar Budha Khan, Cavalry
- Dafadar Dalip Singh, Cavalry
- Kot Dafadar Abdul Khalik, Cavalry, attached Machine Gun Squadron
- Kot Dafadar Sahes Singh, Cavalry
- Sowar Hazrat Shah, Cavalry
- Jemadar Ram Singh, Cavalry
- Kot Dafadar Ghilzai Khan, Cavalry
- Dafadar Lai Khan, Cavalry
- Dafadar Sherjam Khan, Cavalry
- Lance Dafadar Mehr Singh, Cavalry
- Jemadar Kehar Sing, Lancers
- Dafadar Bhur Singh, Lancers
- Dafadar Rup Singh, Lancers
- Lance Dafadar Zalim Singh, Lancers
- Havildar Fateh Ali, Infantry, attached Mhow Cavalry Field Ambulance
- Sepoy Mahomed Shah, Infantry, attached Mhow Cavalry Field Ambulance
- Ward Orderly Devi Dyal, Infantry, attached Secunderabad Cavalry Field Ambulance
- Sepoy Chowdre Khan, Infantry

=== Distinguished Service Medal (DSM) ===
- Chief Engine-Room Artificer, 1st Class, Frank Dymond, O.N. 268895.
- Chief Engine-Room Artificer, 1st Class, Herbert Neal, O.N. 268656 (Dev.).
- Chief Engine-Room Artificer, 2nd Class, William Ford, O.N. 347366 (Dev.).
- Chief Engine-Room Artificer, 2nd Class, Robert Charles Lees, O.N. 270022 (Po.).
- Chief Petty Officer William Henry Palmer, O.N. 159159 (Dev.).
- Chief Stoker Frederick Aldred, O.N. 296182 (Po.).
- Ship's Steward Arthur James Litton, O.N. 158887 (Dev.).
- Colour Sergeant Leonard Daw Roberts, Royal Marine Light Infantry, No. Po./10345.
- Sergeant Harry Richard Lucas, Royal Marine Artillery, No. R.M.A./8139.
- Chief Yeoman of Signals George Whitby, O.N. 182090 (Ch.).
- Petty Officer William Henry Hoyle, O.N. 231577 (Dev.).
- Petty Officer Tomson Matthews, O.N. 194798 (Dev.).
- Petty Officer, 1st Class, Edward Charles Street, O.N. 190782 (Po.).
- Stoker Petty Officer George Parmenter, (Ch.). O.N. 231316
- S.B.S. Charles Robert Allwright, O.N. 351201 (Ch.).
- Engine-Room Artificer, 3rd Class, Edward Frank Roser, O.N.M. 2331 (Po.).
- Stoker, 1st Class, Patrick Walsh, O.N. 307219 (Po.).
- Able Seaman Hubert Samuel Bevis, O.N. 214513 (Po,).
- Officer's Steward, 2nd Class, Frank Pook, O.N. 364787 (Dev.).
- Musician Arthur George Sylvester Flippence, Royal Marines, No. R.M.B./1240.
- Chief Petty Order Thomas Robert Cozens, O.N. 126325 (R.F.R. Po./A1810).
- Chief Petty Officer James Henry Lancey, O.N. 192924 (Dev.)
- Chief Petty Officer John Edward Perritt, O.N. 117897 (R.F.R. Ch./A754).
- Petty Officer, 1st Class, George Charles Day, O.N. 178422 (R.F.R. Ch./B5056).
- Petty Officer William Herbert Winton, O.N. 191799 (Ch.).
- Petty Officer 1st Class, William Austin Adams, O.N. 122336 (R.F.R. Ch./A895).
- Able Seaman William Robert Bull, O.N. J15960 (Ch.).
- Able Seaman David Thomas Elliott, O.N. J13695 (Po.).
- Seaman William Spry, Royal Naval Reserve, O.N. 4889A
- Boy Telegraphist Ernest Kelly, O.N. J35560.
- Engine-Room Artificer, 1st Class, Albert George Pearson, O.N. 271010 (Ch.).
- Stoker Petty Officer William Driver, O.N. 295045 (Po.).
- Engineman William Betmead, Royal Naval Reserve, O.N. 1054 E.S.
- Engineman Fred William Briggs, Royal Naval Reserve, O.N. 1106 E.S.
- Engineman Harold Cooke, Royal Naval Reserve, O.N. 1776 E.S.
- Engineman Charles Edward East, Royal Naval Reserve., O.N. 222 E.S.
- Engineman William Fleming, Royal Naval Reserve, O.N. 600 E.S.
- Engineman James Reid, Royal Naval Reserve, O.N. 18 T.S.
- Engineman Charles Edward Vittery, Royal Naval Reserve, O.N. 1601 E.S.
- Engineman Fred Piercy Wilson, Royal Naval Reserve, O.N. 34 E.S.
- Trimmer Richard Morrison, Royal Naval Reserve, O.N. 215 T.S.
- 2nd Hand Richard Combe, Royal Naval Reserve, O.N. 447.
- 2nd Hand John Noble Stephen, Royal Naval Reserve, O.N. 2480 S.A.
- 2nd Hand Francis John Williams, Royal Naval Reserve, O.N. 1948 S.A.
- Deck Hand Alexander Davidson, Royal Naval Reserve, O.N. 158 D.A.
- Deck Hand Bert Huntingdon, Royal Naval Reserve, O.N. 390 D.A.
- Deck Hand Daniel Nithsdale, Royal Naval Reserve, O.N. 4253 D.A.
- Deck Hand David William Leon Simpson, Royal Naval Reserve, O.N. 1397 D.A.
- Deck Hand Charles Shell, Royal Naval Reserve, O.N. 671 D.A.
- Leading Seaman Albert William Broadway, O.N. J 2128.
- Acting Leading Stoker Lionel Elsom Corker, O.N. K 7145.
- Leading Signalman Frederick Thomas Davis, O.N. J 4828.
- Engine-Room Artificer, 3rd Class, Sidney Lewis Dole Frampton, O.N. 272185.
- Petty Officer William Edmund Goddard, O.N. 201173.
- Petty Officer William Harry Gunton, O.N. 211821.
- Petty Officer Richard Charles Hammett, O.N. 211319.
- Petty Officer Edwin Walter Harrison, O.N.176446.
- Petty Officer Edward Haydon, O.N. 204255.
- Able Seaman George William Hodder, O.N. 216122.
- Acting Leading Stoker Walter Humphries, O.N. 310331.
- Petty Officer John Ilott, O.N. 191730.
- Acting Leading Stoker Charles Kessell, O.N. K 1517.
- Leading Seaman Benjamin Charles Litchfield, O.N. 226273.
- Leading Seaman Patrick Andrew McEvoy, O.N. 229316.
- Chief Stoker George Plain, O.N. 280740.
- Petty Officer Alfred Albert Ernest Phillips, O.N. 228052.
- Stoker, 1st Class, Percy Sidney Saville, K 10730.
- Leading Telegraphist Albert Thomas Sibthorpe, O.N. J 7280.
- Petty Officer Roland Thomas Stripp, O.N. 236087.
- Leading Stoker Albert Owen Tilbury, O.N. K 1547.
- Engine-room Artificer, 3rd Class, Alfred Alexander Truscott, O.N. M 1438.
- Acting Chief Engine-Room Artificer, 2nd Class, Alexander Weir, O.N. 271563.
- Able Seaman Harry Winter, O.N. 239599.
- Chief Engineer Frederick Livingstone Angus, Nigeria Marine Contingent.
- Chief Engine-Room Artificer, 1st Class, Albert Charles Burton, O.N. 269517.
- Mechanic Harry Clifford Curtis, O.N. 302704.
- Petty Officer Herbert Henry Bond Whitty, O.N. 191257.
- Electrical Artificer, 2nd Class, Henry Frederick Williams, O.N. 347904.
- Able Seaman Albert Edward John Stevens, O.N. J23636.
- Private William Frederick Hammond, Royal Marine Light Infantry, No. Ch./17137.
- Corporal Frederick William Hemmings, Royal Marine Light Infantry, No. Ch./16851.
- Lance-Corporal Albert Charles Rutland, Royal Marine Light Infantry, No. Ch./15142.
- Petty Officer John Butters, O.N. 137522 (R.F.R., Dev./A3497).
- Deck Hand Leonard Findlay, Royal Naval Reserve, O.N. 4842 D.A.
- Petty Officer Albert Edward Gregory, O.N. 209657 (Po.).
- Petty Officer Frederick Dart, O.N. 214897 (Po.).
- Petty Officer Joseph Richard Ashfield, O.N. 227875 (Dev.).
- Engine-Room Artificer, 3rd Class, Frank. William Crabbe, O.N. M1483 (Po.).
- Petty Officer, 1st Class, William John Adams, O.N. 189087 (Dev.).
- Leading Seaman Daniel Joseph Donovan, O.N. 204180 (Dev.).
- Petty Officer Thomas Heffernan, O.N. 158031.
- Acting Chief Armourer Albert Henry Hinks, O.N. 343208.
- Armourers Crew Ernest Charles King, O.N. 16034.
- Leading Seaman James Robert Sole, O.N. 240147.
- Able Seaman Charles George Bremer Barham, O.N. J9079.
- Serjeant Walter Henry France, Royal Marine Artillery, No. R.M.A./5510.
- Gunner Adam Fenton, Royal Marine Artillery, No. R.M.A./ 6904 (R.F.A./B/353).
- Petty Officer William Ernest Sims, O.N. 199647 (Dev.).
- Petty Officer Mechanic Charles Ernest Cobb, Royal Naval Air Service, O.N. F4623.
- Petty Officer Mechanic Donald McLean Graham, Royal Naval Air Service, O.N. F4625.
- Able Mechanic Herbert William Marsh, O.N. J16274 (Dev.).
- Seaman George Behenna, Royal Naval Reserve, O.N. 3996B.
- Signaller George Sydney Tosker, Royal Naval Volunteer Reserve, O.N. London, 3/2502.

=== King's Police Medal (KPM) ===
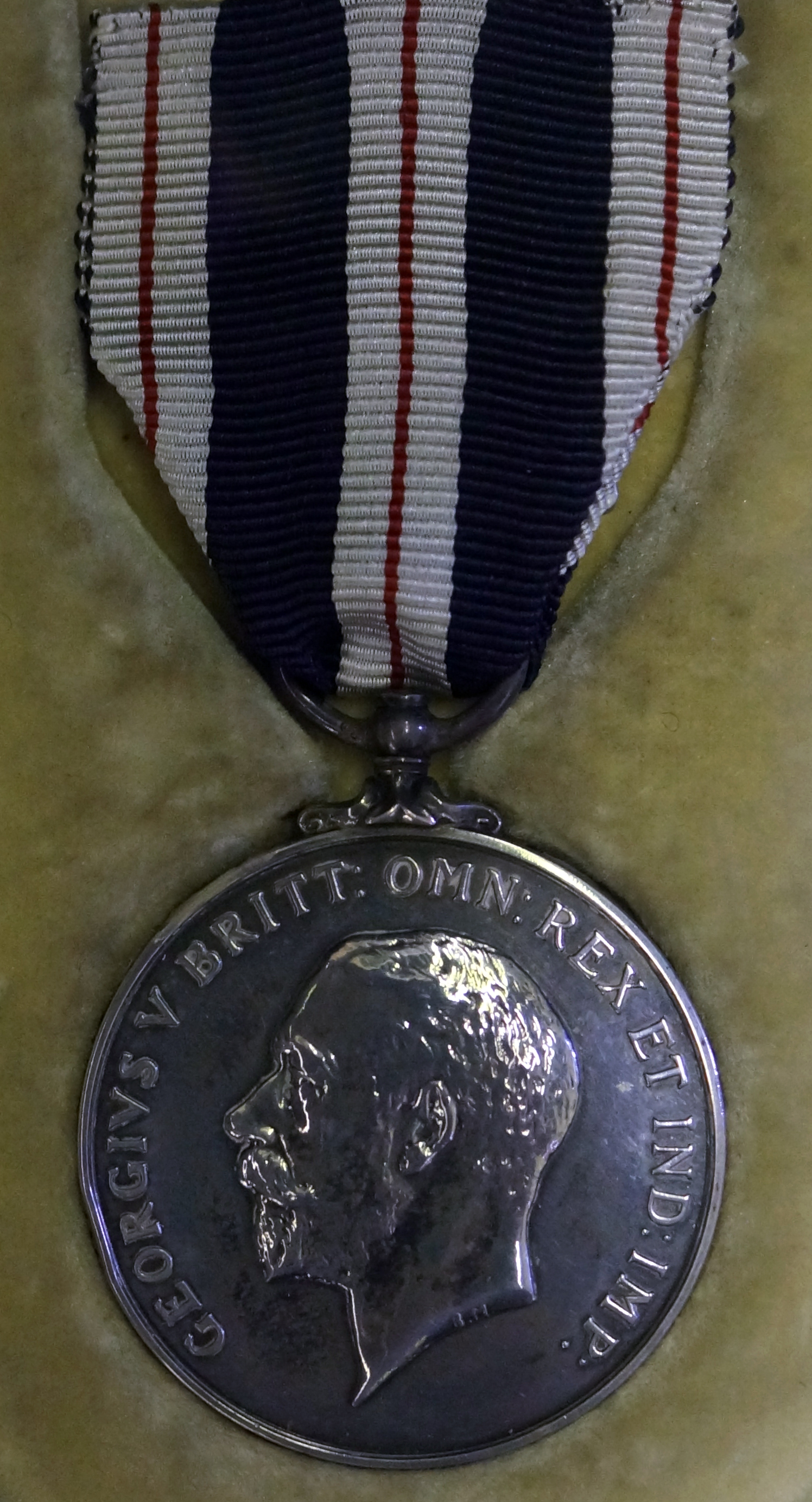
King's Police Medal with the riband for gallantry

England and Wales

Police Forces

- Captain Cecil Mitchell Innes, Chief Constable of Lincolnshire
- Frank Richardson, Chief Constable of Hereford
- Alexander Bruce, Chief Superintendent and Chief Clerk of the Bristol City Police
- Robert Duckworth, Superintendent in the Liverpool City Police
- James William Olive, Superintendent in the Metropolitan Police Force
- Harry Osborn, Superintendent and Deputy Chief Constable of the Lincolnshire Constabulary
- John Ottaway, Superintendent in the City of London Police
- Arthur Simmonds, Superintendent in the Surrey Police
- William Wood, Superintendent and Deputy Chief Constable of the Hertfordshire Constabulary
- John Clynes, Detective Inspector in the Manchester City Police
- Arthur Askew, Sergeant in the Metropolitan. Police Force
- John Collins, Sergeant in the Birmingham City Police
- Herbert Archer, Constable in the Metropolitan Police Force, Rosyth Dockyard Division
- Albert Edward Bell, Constable in the Isle of Man Constabulary
- George Burton, Constable in the Metropolitan Police Force, Portsmouth Dockyard Division
- Thomas Parnell Gibbons, Constable in the Lancashire Constabulary
- William Green, Constable in the Lancashire Constabulary
- William Hall, Constable in the Birmingham City Police
- George Bowles, Constable in the Metropolitan Police Force
- William Longhurst, Constable in the Metropolitan Police Force
- Thomas Slipper, Constable in the Metropolitan Police Force

Fire Brigades

- Sidney Gompertz Gamble, Divisional Officer, London Fire Brigade
- Arthur Reginald Dyer, Divisional Officer, London Fire Brigade
- William Gardiner, Station Officer, London Fire Brigade

Scotland

Police Forces

- Finlay Forbes, Superintendent in the Edinburgh City Police
- John Samuel, Superintendent in the Glasgow City Police
- Donald Macleod, Constable in the Glasgow City Police

Fire Brigades

- Joseph Gillan, Senior Superintendent, Glasgow Fire Brigade

Ireland

Police Forces

- George Bedell Ruttledge, County Inspector in the Royal Irish Constabulary
- Patrick Haugh, Sergeant in the Dublin Metropolitan Police
- William O'Connell and Thomas Reilly, Sergeants in the Royal Irish Constabulary
- John Barton, Constable in the Dublin Metropolitan Police
- Thomas Barrett, Constable in the Dublin Metropolitan Police
- James H. Coulter, Constable in the Dublin Metropolitan Police
- Eugene Bratton, Constable in the Royal Irish Constabulary

British India

Police Forces

- Alfred Francis Bulkley, Assistant Superintendent, Madras Police
- Kandaswami Mudali, Head Constable, Chingleput District Police, Madras Police
- Muhammad Ali, Constable, Chingleput District Police, Madras Police
- Vepa Kommah Subramania Ayyar, Third-grade Head Constable, Cuddapah District Police, Madras Police
- Fateh Khan, Head Constable, Larkana District Police, Bombay Police
- Raymond Thomas Barker, Deputy Superintendent of Police, Karachi, Bombay Police
- Rao Saheb Girdharsing Maniram, Third-Grade, Inspector, Bombay Police
- Satis Chandra Banarji, Inspector, Bengal Police
- Satis Chandra Mazumdar, Inspector, Bengal Police
- Bhupendra Nath Chatarji, Officiating Inspector, Bengal Police
- Kinsey Beaumont Welford Thomas, Deputy Inspector-General, Bengal Police
- Reginald Clarke, Commissioner, Bengal Police
- Bernard Anson Westbrook, Chief Officer, Calcutta Fire Brigade, Bengal Police
- Muhammad Khurshed, Deputy Superintendent, Bengal Police
- Jadu Ram, Constable, Bengal Police
- Rajendra Kishor Sen, Sub-Inspector, Bengal Police
- Hafizuddin Shaikh, Police Constable, Bengal Police
- Charles Edward Walker Sands, Superintendent, United Provinces Police
- Thomas Arthur Leslie Scott O'Connor, Superintendent, United Provinces Police
- Mubarak Ali Khan, Sub-Inspector, United Provinces Police
- Sarda Prasad, Constable, United Provinces Police
- Duncan Donald, Superintendent, Punjab Police
- Frederick Charles Isemonger, Superintendent, Punjab Police
- Colin Andrew Macpherson, Superintendent, Punjab Police
- Mohammad Sadiq, Head Constable of the Ferozepore District Police, Punjab Police
- Ganda Singh, Foot Constable, Punjab Police
- Niaz Ahmad, Sub-Inspector of the Ludhiana District Police, Punjab Police
- Robert Charles' Elphinstone Underwood, District Superintendent, Toungoo, Burma Civil Police
- Cecil Herbert Munro Roberts, District Superintendent, Myaungmya, Burma Civil Police
- Peter McDonald Burke, Officiating District Superintendent, Prome, Burma Civil Police
- Joseph Alexis Vardon, Deputy Superintendent, Twante, Burma Civil Police
- Maung Aung Gyi, Inspector (second grade), Kyaiklat, Burma Civil Police
- Ram Lagan Singh and Sheodhari Singh, Constables, Bihar and Orissa Police
- Rai Sahib Janaki Ballabh Dae, Superintendent of Police of the Mayurbhanj State
- Clarence Charles Hughes-Hallett, Deputy Inspector-General, Central Provinces Police
- Khan Sahib Maulvi Sharafat Ali Chaudhuri, Deputy Superintendent, Assam Civil Police
- Sarbajit Thapa, Subadar, Lakhimpur Military Police Battalion, Assam Military Police
- Harold Arden Close CIE Inspector-General, North-West Frontier Province Police
- Mahomed Yusaf Khan, Sub-Inspector (second grade), North-West Frontier Province Police
- Gul Mahomed, Foot Constable (third grade), North-West Frontier Province Police
- Mahomed Akram Khan, Sub-Inspector (second grade), North-West Frontier Province Police
- Futteh Hussain, Sub-Inspector, Baluchistan Police

Overseas Dominions

Police Forces

- John Cullen, ISO, Commissioner of Police in New Zealand
- Sydney Watson, Third Officer, New South Wales Fire Brigades
- John Francis Ford, Fourth Officer, New South Wales Fire Brigades
- Salabad Khan, Constable, Singapore Police Force
- Thomas Alexander, Inspector (1st class), Jamaica Constabulary
- Putifar Daniel Julien, Corporal, Mauritius Police Force
- Michel Aza, Constable, Mauritius Police Force
- Yianni Haji Georghi, Private, Cyprus Military Police
- Joseph Blades, Sergeant-Major of Police, British Honduras
- Sunder Singh, Native Officer, Federated Malay States Police

=== Imperial Service Order (ISO) ===
Indian Civil Service

- Edward Evans Harvey, Chief Accountant in the Office of the Director of Ordnance Factories in India

=== Imperial Service Medal (ISM) ===
Home Civil Service

- Charles Adams, Inspector, Post Office, Hastings
- Charles John Allwood, Stamper, Inland Revenue Department
- Arthur Ball, Postman, Birmingham
- James Walter Ball, Postman, Macclesfield
- Joseph Frederic Banks, Sorter, London Postal Service
- Benjamin Christopher Barge, Hospital Principal Warder, Brixton Prison
- James Barlow, Shipwright, Chatham Dockyard
- Walter William Brightman, Leading Man of Labourers, Sheerness Dockyard
- Thomas Frederick Brown, Head Postman, London Postal Service
- Carmelo Bugeja, Skilled Labourer, Chief Constructor's Department, Malta Dockyard
- James Hunter Burch, First Class Inspector and District Officer, Mercantile Marine Office, Board of Trade
- Francis Joseph Burke, Sorting Clerk and Telegraphist, Dublin
- William Pincombe Burridge, Principal Warder, Wakefield Prison
- Alfred Henry Charrosin, Telegraphist, Central Telegraph Office
- Edward Cheaney, Hospital Principal Warder, Brixton Prison
- Joseph Churton, Sorting Clerk and Telegraphist, Stoke-on-Trent
- Herbert Thomas Clark, Postman, London Postal Service
- George Clarke, Rigger, Chatham Dockyard
- Thomas Mason Cole, Shipwright, Portsmouth Dockyard
- James Cooper, Engineer, Class I, Birmingham Prison
- Georgette Elizabeth Cottrall, Counter Clerk and Telegraphist, London Postal Service
- Emily Jane Craig, Sorting Clerk and Telegraphist, Glasgow
- James Cripps, Postman, Bilton, Rugby
- Henry Hirst Crosland, Postman, Huddersfield
- Stephen George Durdson Cuer, Second Class Draftsman (Assistant Overseer), Portsmouth Dockyard
- George Duxon, Chief Warder, Class II, Lincoln Prison
- Richard Henry Feasey, Postman, Birmingham
- Annie Louise File, Sorting Clerk and Telegraphist, Falmouth
- John Finn, Overseer, London Postal Service
- William Dry Fiske, Telegraphist, Central Telegraph Office
- Albion George Fletcher, Clerk and Schoolmaster, Grade I, Hull Prison
- Frederick Fowle, Telegraphist, Central Telegraph Office
- Robert Henry Fox, First Class Draftsman, Portsmouth Dockyard
- Henry Francis, Sorter, London Postal Service
- Thomas William Frew, Overseer, London Postal Service
- Robert George Gill, Painter, Devonport Dockyard
- Thomas Glynn, Sorter, London Postal Service
- Arthur Goodwin, Head Postman, London Postal Service
- Robert Elias Gosney, Tracer, Accountant-General's Department, General Post Office
- John Watson Graham, Postman, Newcastle upon Tyne
- James Alexander Grant, Shipwright (Chargeman), Portsmouth Dockyard
- James Grimsditch, Warder, Grade I, Manchester Prison
- Thomas Hart, Sorter, London Postal Service
- William Harvey, Postman, Bangor
- Charles Alfred Herzog, Head Postman (Division I), London Postal Service
- Thomas Hicks, Preventive Officer, Hull
- George Hillary, Joiner, Portsmouth Dockyard
- Walter Hobbs, Postman, Hitchin
- William Henry Holdaway, Sorter, London Postal Service
- Charles Humphries, Postman, Harlow
- Amos James, Postman, Burghclere, Newbury
- Henry Joce, Shipwright, Devonport Dockyard
- Marion Charlotte Johns, Returner (Old Establishment), Returned Letter Section, London Postal Service
- Edward Thomas Johnson, Overseer of Mail Bag Apparatus, Controller's Office, London Postal Service
- John Kavanagh, Postman, Waterford
- Robert Kelly, Stamper, Inland Revenue Department
- John Kennedy, Postman, Coupar Angus, Perthshire
- James Kernick, Warder, Grade I, Plymouth Prison
- George Henry Lakeman, Skilled Labourer, Devonport Dockyard
- Roger Latham, Postman, Dawley, S.O. Wellington, Salop
- Thomas Lear, Principal Warder, Birmingham Prison
- Ralph Denham Ley, Telegraphist, Central Telegraph Office
- Robert McDonald, Assistant Superintendent, Engraving Division, Ordnance Survey, Southampton
- John Macloghlin, Boundary Examiner, 4th Division, Ordnance Survey, Norwich
- Barbara Ann McMillan, Counter Clerk and Telegraphist, London Postal Service
- Mary Margaret Macnamara, Sorting Clerk and Telegraphist, Dublin
- Jeremiah Mahony, Postman, Farranfore, Killarney
- William Robert Mattocks, Skilled Labourer, Chatham Dockyard
- William James Merren, Skilled Labourer, Devonport Dockyard
- Henry Millard, Postman, Trowbridge
- Edgar Mitchell, Clerk and Schoolmaster, Grade I, Winchester Prison.
- Stephen Morris, Postman, Birmingham
- Lilian Annie Muckle, Writing Assistant, Money Order Department, General Post Office
- Joseph Newcombe, Postman, Leamington Spa
- John Thomas Nicholls, Preventive Officer, Liverpool
- James Nunn, Postman, Wrentham, Halesworth
- Cornelius Christopher Parfitt, Sorting Clerk and Telegraphist, Norwich
- William James Childs Peard, Skilled Labourer, Devonport Dockyard
- Felix Perry, Overseer, London Postal Service
- Francis Clemson Phillips, Scripture Reader, Dartmoor Prison
- William Pickett, Sorter, London Postal Service
- George Playford, Postman, King's Lynn
- Albert Rabey, Shipwright, Devonport Dockyard
- John R Smith Rean, Devonport Dockyard
- William Hogarth Reid, Plan Examiner, 9th Division, Ordnance Survey, York
- John Henry Richards, Shipwright, Devonport Dockyard
- John Roberton, Shipwright, Portsmouth Dockyard
- William Robinson, Overseer, Post Office, Blackpool
- John Ryder, Postman, Dysart, Kirkcaldy
- Harry Robert Saunders, Postman, Stroud
- George Shea, Sorter, London Postal Service
- William Sillifant, Postman, Beaworthy, Okehampton
- William George Snook, Rigger (Chargeman), Portsmouth Dockyard
- Robert Stitson, Skilled Labourer, Devonport Dockyard
- Henry Stock, Single Station Labourer, Sheerness Dockyard
- John Henry Styles, Telegraphist, Central Telegraph Office
- Adolphus Taylor, Warder, Grade I, Pentonville Prison
- Frank Thomas, Postman, Birmingham
- Henry Thomas, Postman, Brough, Hull
- John Thomas Tozer, Smith, Devonport Dockyard
- Thomas Mardon Ttenery, Shipwright, Chatham Dockyard
- Frederick Turner, postman, Canterbury
- David Samuel Underwood, Postman, Stevenage
- Walter Wallis, Postman, Barnet
- William Henry Watters, Head Postman, London Postal Service
- John Whamond, Overseer, Post Office, Liverpool
- Frederick Henry White, Postman, Ashburton, Newton Abbot
- Walter William Wickham, Master of Yardcraft, Chatham Dockyard
- Martha Anne Wilkinson, Sorting Clerk and Telegraphist, Keighley
- James Willgress, Postman, Castle Acre, Swatham
- John Williams, Shipwright, Portsmouth Dockyard
- Edwin Matthew Wise, Tracer, Accountant-General's Department, General Post Office
- William Wise, Postman, Cockermouth

Colonial Civil Service

Department of Railways and Canals, Canada

- Hermenegilde Aubin, Conductor, Levis
- Thomas Clifford Ayer, Conductor, Moncton
- Télesphore Begin, Wheel Press Man, Rivière-du-Loup
- David Pearson Bell, Car Inspector, Moncton
- Joseph Boucher, Brakeman, Lévis
- Dennis Bourgeois, Section Foreman, Memramcook
- John Herbert Brown, Engineer's Assistant, Moncton
- Nathan Burris, Hostler, Truro
- Leandre Chenard, Baggageman, Lévis
- Robert Cullen, Stores Issuer, Truro
- Joseph Damours, Brakeman, Rivière-du-Loup
- Edward Daley, Section Foreman, Gloucester Junction
- William Allan Davies, Foreman, Moncton
- Frank Derouin, Conductor, Lévis
- Edward Doucett, Trackman, Petit-Rocher
- Richard Dougan, Engineman, Charlottetown
- Xavier Dubé, Section Foreman, St. Moise
- Robert Dunbar, Conductor, Loggieville
- James Essery, Section Foreman, Kensington
- David Ferguson, Section Foreman, Wentworth
- Peter Fogarty, Section Foreman, Sydney
- George Forgues, Brakeman, Lévis
- George Frève, Section Foreman, St. Paschal
- Peter Alexander Gallagher, Section Foreman, Quispamsis
- Andrew Gallant, Trackman, Millstream
- Thomas Gillan, Blacksmith, Charlottetown
- John Gillespie, Chargehand, Moncton
- Adam Purdy Giles, Roadmaster, Newcastle
- Frank Gillis, Locomotive Cleaner, Cape Traverse
- James Gorham, Checker, St. John
- Alexander Black Gray, Roadmaster, New Glasgow
- John Guess, Blacksmith, Halifax
- John Hackett, Engineman, Moncton
- Thomas Hanway, Engineman, Truro
- Joseph Louis Hébert, Conductor, Rivière-du-Loup
- William Robert Hoey, Fireman, Moncton
- Aaron Hubley, Carpenter, Halifax
- Charles Bedford Keith, Station Agent, Berry's Mills
- Fortunat Laliberté, Conductor, Lévis
- Philippe Leclerc, Chargeman, Rivière-du-Loup
- Edwin Nelson Lockhart, Bridge Inspector, Moncton
- William Brouard MacKenzie, Right of Way and Lease Agent, Moncton
- William McAdoo, Carpenter, St. John
- Patrick McCloskey, Boilermaker, Charlottetown
- James Steward McClure, Carpenter, Moncton
- John McDonald, Section Foreman, Millstream
- George Hamilton McEwen, Freight Agent, Truro
- John Thomas McGinn, Conductor, Moncton
- Hugh McLeod, Extra Gang Foreman, Emerald
- John McPherson, Fitter, Charlottetown
- Louis Martin, Car Repairer, Rivière-du-Loup
- Samuel Miller, Foreman Carpenter, Newcastle
- George Moore, Machinist, Moncton
- Louis Moreau, Stationary Boiler Fireman, Lévis
- John Albert Murray, Station Agent, Shediac
- John Eric Oakleaf, Engineman, Dalhousie
- Peter Oliver, Tool Inspector, Charlottetown
- Luc Séraphin Paulet, Conductor, Lévis
- William Richard Payne, Station Agent, Newcastle
- Pierre Philip Pettigrew, Baggagemaster, Rivière-du-Loup
- John Phelan, Porter, Halifax
- William Robert Powell, Section Foreman, Painsec Junction
- James Roche, Section Foreman, Bedford
- Didace Rodrigue, Operator, Rivière-du-Loup
- John Ryan, Section Foreman, Nauwigewauk
- Charles Edward Simmons, Painter, Charlottetown
- William Harvey Steeves, Fitter, Moncton
- Arthur Stockall, Foreman Blacksmith, Moncton
- John Sullivan, Section Foreman, Rogersville
- Benjamin Tucker, Foreman Pipe Fitter, Moncton
- Frederick William Welling, Engineman, Moncton
- Frederick Wright, Hostler, St. John
- James Chapman Wortman, Carpenter, Moncton

Miscellaneous Colonial

- Thomas Baker, Lightkeeper, Department of Marine and Fisheries, Pease Island, Nova Scotia
- William Noah Collier, Senior Warder, Prisons Department, New South Wales
- Michael James Collins, Chief Warder, Prisons Department, New South Wales
- William Henry Coulsen, First Class Warder, Prisons Department, New South Wales
- John Coyne, Police Sergeant, First Class, New South Wales
- John A Police Sergeant Curtis, First Class, New South Wales
- James Goulding Draper, Police Inspector, Third Class, New South Wales
- Percy Fortescue, Police Sergeant, First Class, New South Wales
- James Geraghty, Senior Inspector of Police, Queensland
- John Joseph Manuel, Police Sergeant, Second Class, New South Wales
- James Meldrum, Police Sergeant, First Class, New South Wales
- John Murdoch, Police Class, New South Wales
- Thomas Ogilvie Porter, Queensland
- James Rochford, Police Class, New South Wales
- Alfred Percy Young, Police Sergeant, Third Class, New South Wales
