= 1940 Birthday Honours =

British government recognitions

The 1940 Birthday Honours were appointments by King George VI to various orders and honours to reward and highlight good works by citizens of the British Empire. The appointments were made to celebrate the official birthday of The King, and were published on 9 July 1940.

The list was postponed from June 13, the official observance of the king's birthday, because of the Cabinet changes in May. There were no civilian awards or peerages granted because of the ongoing war; all honours were given in recognition of war service.

The recipients of honours are displayed here as they were styled before their new honour, and arranged by honour, with classes (Knight, Knight Grand Cross, etc.) and then military divisions (Royal Navy, Army, etc.) as appropriate.

== The Most Honourable Order of the Bath ==
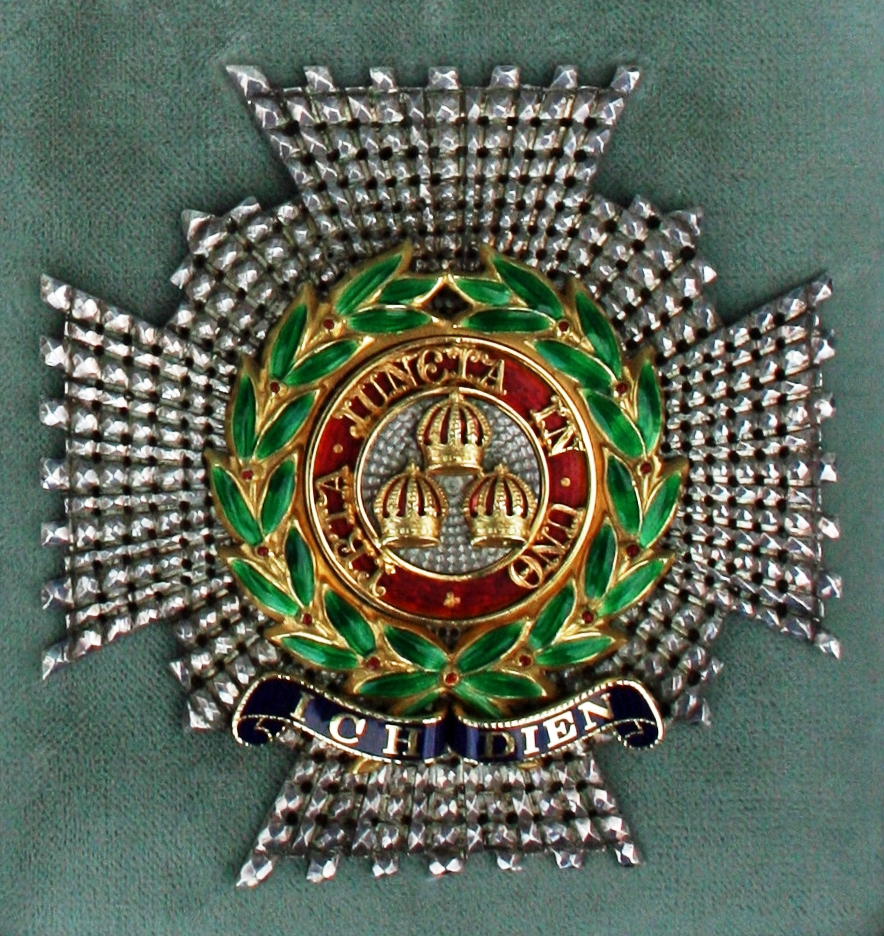
Military star of the Order of the Bath

=== Knight Grand Cross of the Order of the Bath (GCB) ===
Royal Navy

- Admiral of the Fleet Sir Charles Morton Forbes KCB DSO

Army

- General Sir John Francis Stanhope Duke Coleridge KCB CMG DSO Indian Army.

=== Knight Commander of the Order of the Bath (KCB) ===
Royal Navy

- Vice-Admiral Thomas Hugh Binney CB DSO
- Vice-Admiral Geoffrey Layton CB DSO
- Vice-Admiral George Hamilton D'Oyly Lyon CB
- Vice-Admiral Charles Gordon Ramsey CB

Army

- Lieutenant General Robert Hadden Haining CB DSO Colonel Commandant, Royal Artillery.
- Major General Hastings Lionel Ismay CB DSO Indian Army.
- Lieutenant General James Handyside Marshall-Cornwall CB CBE DSO MC Colonel Commandant, Royal Artillery.
- Lieutenant General Henry Maitland Wilson CB DSO Colonel Commandant, The Rifle Brigade (Prince Consort's Own).

Royal Air Force

- Air Marshal Arthur Sheridan Barratt CB CMG MC RAF
- Acting Air Marshal Richard Edmund Charles Peirse CB DSO AFC RAF
- Acting Air Marshal Charles Frederick Algernon Portal CB DSO MC RAF

=== Companion of the Order of the Bath (CB) ===
Royal Navy

- Rear-Admiral Alban Thomas Buckley Curteis.
- Surgeon Rear-Admiral Sheldon Francis Dudley OBE FRCP
- Engineer Rear-Admiral Samuel Harrison Dunlop.
- Major General Alfred Leonard Forster DSO RM
- Rear-Admiral Ronald Hamilton Curzon Hallifax.
- Rear-Admiral Arthur John Layard Murray DSO OBE
- Rear-Admiral Patrick Macnamara CBE (retired)
- Rear-Admiral Arthur Francis Pridham.
- Rear-Admiral William Eric Campbell Tait MVO
- Rear-Admiral Algernon Usborne Willis DSO

Army

- Major General Kenneth Arthur Noel Anderson MC (late The Seaforth Highlanders (Rossshire Buffs, The Duke of Albany's)).
- Major General Clarence August Bird DSO (late Royal Engineers).
- Colonel Ernest Marshall Cowell CBE DSO TD FRCS (late Royal Army Medical Corps, Territorial Army).
- Major General Henry Osborne Curtis DSO MC (late The King's Royal Rifle Corps).
- Major General (acting Lieutenant General) Arthur Nugent Floyer-Acland DSO MC (late The Duke of Cornwall's Light Infantry).
- Major General Harold Edmund Franklyn DSO MC Colonel, The Green Howards (Alexandra, Princess of Wales's Own Yorkshire Regiment).
- Colonel (acting Major General) Noel Mackintosh Stuart Irwin DSO MC (late The Border Regiment).
- Colonel (acting Brigadier) Charles Edward Hudson VC DSO MC (late The King's Own Scottish Borderers).
- Colonel (acting Brigadier) Sir Colin Arthur Jardine Bt DSO MC (late Royal Artillery).
- Major General Arthur Edward Grasett DSO MC (late Royal Engineers).
- Colonel (acting Brigadier) John Gregson Halsted OBE MC (late The Loyal Regiment (North Lancashire)).
- Major General Thomas George Gordon Heywood OBE (late Royal Artillery).
- Colonel (Temp. Brigadier) Henry Temple Devereux Hickman OBE MC Indian Army.
- Colonel (Temp. Brigadier) Hugh Robert Charles Lane DSO OBE Indian Army.
- Colonel (temporary Brigadier) the Hon. Edward Frederick Lawson DSO MC TD (late Royal Artillery, Territorial Army).
- Colonel (Temp. Brigadier) Harold Victor Lewis CIE DSO MC Indian Army.
- Major General Harry Macdonald DSO Indian Army.
- Major General Giffard Le Quesne Martel DSO MC MIMechE (late Royal Engineers).
- Major General Bernard Law Montgomery DSO (late The Royal Warwickshire Regiment)
- Major General (acting Lieutenant General) Hugh Royds Stokes Massy DSO MC (late Royal Artillery).
- Major General Thomas Cochrane Newton DSO OBE (late Royal Artillery).
- Major General Ridley Pakenham Pakenham-Walsh MC (late Royal Engineers).
- Major General Richard Nugent O'Connor DSO MC (late The Cameronians (Scottish Rifles)).
- Major General (acting Lieutenant General) Bernard Charles Tolver Paget DSO MC (late The Oxfordshire and Buckinghamshire Light Infantry).
- Major General Roderic Loraine Petre DSO MC (late The Dorsetshire Regiment).
- Major General Robert Valentine Pollok CBE DSO (late Irish Guards).
- Major General George Brian Ogilvie Taylor CBE (late Royal Engineers).
- Colonel (acting Brigadier) Ralph Chenevix Trench OBE MC (late Royal Corps of Signals).
- Major General (acting Lieutenant General) Henry Colville Barclay Wemyss DSO MC (late Royal Corps of Signals).

Royal Air Force

- Air Vice-Marshal Charles Hubert Boulby Blount OBE MC RAF
- Air Vice-Marshal William Sholto Douglas MC DFC RAF
- Air Vice-Marshal Douglas Claude Strathern Evill DSC AFC RAF
- Air Vice-Marshal Arthur Travers Harris OBE AFC RAF
- Air Vice-Marshal Trafford Leigh Leigh-Mallory DSO RAF
- Air Commodore Reginald Lennox George Marix DSO RAF

== The Most Exalted Order of the Star of India ==
=== Knight Grand Commander (GCSI) ===
- General Sir Robert Archibald Cassels GCB CSI DSO Commander-in-Chief in India.

== The Most Distinguished Order of Saint Michael and Saint George ==
=== Companion of the Order of St Michael and St George (CMG) ===
- Lieutenant Colonel Stanley James Cole OBE Staff Officer, African Colonial Forces.

== Order of the Indian Empire ==
=== Knight Commander (KCIE) ===
- Major General Chauncy Batho Dashwood Strettell CB Indian Army, Commander, Peshawar District.

=== Companion (CIE) ===
- Major General Stanley Woodburn Kirby OBE MC British Service, Deputy Master-General of the Ordnance, Army Headquarters, India.
- Colonel (Honorary Brigadier) Herbert Charles Dibben (Retired List), lately Director of Veterinary Services in India.
- Colonel (Temp. Brigadier) Theophilus John Ponting MC Indian Army, Brigade Commander.
- Colonel (Temp. Brigadier) William le Couteur Brodrick, Indian Army, Director of Contracts, Army Headquarters, India.

== The Most Excellent Order of the British Empire ==
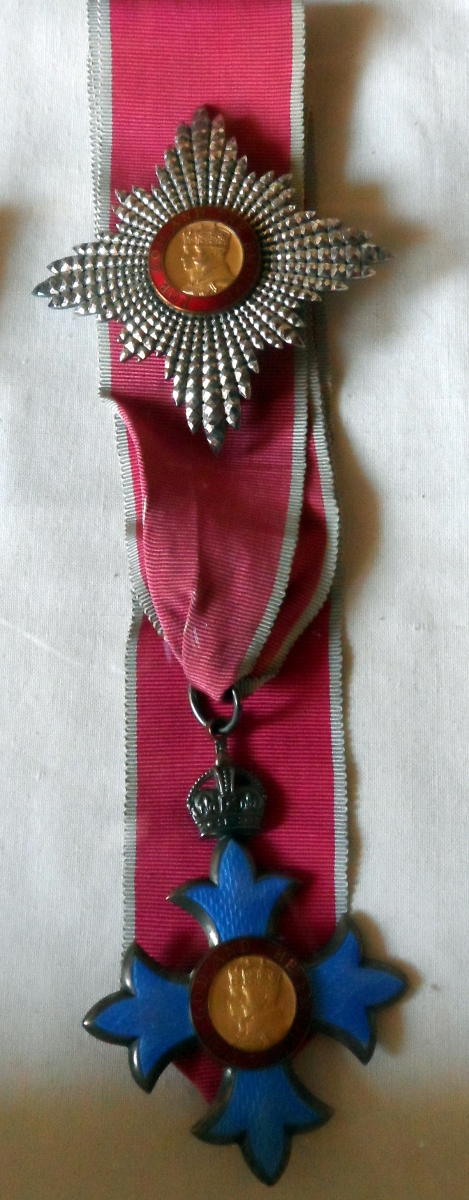
Insignia of a Knight Commander of the Order of the British Empire

=== Knight Commander of the Order of the British Empire (KBE) ===
Royal Navy

- Admiral Henry Ralph Crooke CB (Retired, Serving as Commodore, 2nd Class Royal Navy Reserves).
- Vice-Admiral Wilbraham Tennyson Randle Ford CB

Army

- Major General (acting Lieutenant General) Wilfrid Gordon Lindsell DSO OBE MC (late Royal Artillery).
- Major General (acting Lieutenant General) Henry Royds Pownall CB DSO MC (late Royal Artillery).

Royal Air Force

- Air Vice-Marshal Patrick Henry Lyon Playfair CB CVO MC

Colonies, Protectorates, etc.

- Major General John Evelyn Duigan CB DSO New Zealand Staff Corps.

=== Commander of the Order of the British Empire (CBE) ===
Royal Navy

- Captain Douglas Blake Fisher OBE
- Captain Cecil Halliday Jepson Harcourt
- Captain Ralph Kerr
- Captain Reginald Maxwell Servaes

Army

- Lieutenant Colonel (acting Colonel) Edmund Charles Beard MC The Duke of Wellington's Regiment (West Riding).
- Colonel (acting Brigadier) Valentine Oakley Beuttler DSO late Royal Army Service Corps.
- Colonel (acting Brigadier) Frederic William Lyon Bissett DSO MC Retired Pay, Reserve of Officers, late Northamptonshire Regiment.
- Colonel (temporary Brigadier) Reginald John Cash MC TD Territorial Army, late The Royal Warwickshire Regiment (Territorial Army).
- Colonel (temporary Brigadier) Sir Geoffrey Selby Church Bt MC TD Territorial Army, late Royal Artillery, Territorial Army.
- Lieutenant Colonel Arthur Francis St. Clair Collins OBE MC AMIMechE Royal Army Service Corps.
- Colonel (temporary Brigadier) John Scott Crawford MIMechE late Royal Army Ordnance Corps.
- Colonel Basil Cranmer Dening MC late Royal Engineers. (Appointment to be dated 1 June 1940).
- Colonel Fitz-Alan Drayson MC (retired pay) late Royal Corps of Signals.
- Colonel (temporary Brigadier) Charles Bannatyne Findlay MC late Royal Artillery.
- Colonel (acting Brigadier) Arthur Leslie Irvine Friend OBE MC Reserve of Officers, late 11th Hussars (Prince Albert's Own)).
- Colonel (temporary Brigadier) Humfrey Myddelton Gale MC late Royal Army Service Corps.
- Colonel (temporary Brigadier) Gerald Ian Gartlan DSO MC late The Royal Ulster Rifles.
- Colonel (temporary Brigadier) Claude le Bas Goldney MC Royal Army Service Corps.
- Colonel Ian Cameron Grant DSO late The Queen's Own Cameron Highlanders.
- Colonel (acting Brigadier) Cyrus Greenslade OBE late The Devonshire Regiment.
- Colonel (acting Brigadier) Charles Joseph Edwards Greenwood MC late Royal Engineers.
- Colonel Hugh William Roberts Hamilton DSO MC late Royal Engineers.
- Colonel (temporary Brigadier) Leonard Arthur Hawes DSO MC late Royal Artillery.
- Colonel (temporary Brigadier) Douglas McArthur Hogg MC late Royal Engineers.
- Colonel (acting Brigadier) Noel Galway Holmes MC late The East Yorkshire Regiment (The Duke of York's Own).
- Colonel (temporary Brigadier) Harold George Howson MC TD Territorial Army, late Royal Artillery, Territorial Army.
- Colonel (temporary Brigadier) Balfour Oliphant Hutchison, late 10th Royal Hussars (Prince of Wales's Own).
- Colonel (temporary Brigadier) Maurice Denham Jephson, Territorial Army (Major), Retired Pay, Reserve of Officers, The Royal Norfolk Regiment.
- Colonel (acting Brigadier) Sir Oliver William Hargreaves Leese Bt DSO late Coldstream Guards.
- Colonel Reginald Henry Lorie, late The Royal Ulster Rifles.
- Colonel (acting Brigadier) Geoffrey Ernest Mansergh MC late Royal Corps of Signals. (Appointment to be dated 1 June 1940).
- Colonel (acting Brigadier) Charles Walter Massy DSO MC late Royal Artillery.
- Lieutenant Colonel (acting Brigadier) Donald Jay McMullen DSO OBE MIMechE Royal Engineers.
- Lieutenant Colonel Charles Alexander Phipps Murison MC Royal Artillery.
- Colonel (acting Brigadier) Guy Allen Colpoys Ormsby-Johnson OBE MC Royal Army Pay Corps.
- Colonel (acting Brigadier) Reginald Horace Roger Parminter DSO MC late The Manchester Regiment.
- Colonel (temporary Brigadier) Charles Constantine Phipps OBE MC late Royal Engineers.
- Colonel (temporary Major General) Vyvyan Vavasour Pope DSO MC late Royal Tank Regiment, Royal Armoured Corps.
- Colonel (acting Brigadier) Neil Methuen Ritchie DSO MC late The Black Watch (Royal Highland Regiment).
- Colonel Charles Edward Gowran Shearman DSO MC late The Bedfordshire and Hertfordshire Regiment.
- Group Captain Alexander Shekleton DSO OBE
- Colonel William Thomson Sheppard DSO Retired Pay, late Royal Army Ordnance Corps.
- Colonel (temporary Brigadier) John George des Reaux Swayne, late The Somerset Light Infantry (Prince Albert's), and The Royal Northumberland Fusiliers.
- Colonel Arthur Clifton Sykes DSO OBE late Royal Corps of Signals.
- Colonel Edwin Ernest Enever Todd OBE Royal Army Pay Corps.
- Colonel (Honorary Brigadier) Clement Thurstan Tomes DSO MC (retired pay), Colonel, The Royal Warwickshire Regiment.
- Colonel (acting Brigadier) Rowland Henry Towell MC late Royal Artillery.
- Lieutenant Colonel (acting Brigadier) Edward Galvey Warren, The Northamptonshire Regiment.
- Colonel (temporary Brigadier) Daril Gerard Watson MC late The Duke of Cornwall's Light Infantry.
- Colonel (Honorary Brigadier) John Leslie Weston DSO Retired Pay, Reserve of Officers, late Royal Army Service Corps.
- Colonel Gordon Wilson OBE MC late Royal Army Medical Corps.

Royal Air Force

- Air Commodore Arthur Samuel Glynn
- Air Commodore (now Acting Air Vice-Marshal) Frederick George Darby Hards DSC DFC
- Group Captain Robert Victor Goddard
- Air Commodore Charles William Nutting OBE DSC
- Group Captain Walter Thorne

Nursing

- Catherine Murray Roy RRC MM Matron-in-Chief, Queen Alexandra's Imperial Military Nursing Service.

Colonies, Protectorates, etc.

- Group Captain Leonard Monk Isitt RNZAF
- Colonel Charles Joseph Dane Lanktree, E.D. General Reserve, Ceylon Defence Force.
- Colonel (Brigadier) Edmund Frank Lind DSO VD Australian Military Forces.
- Colonel Owen Herbert Mead DSO New Zealand Staff Corps.
- Paymaster Captain Robert Charles Negus

=== Officer of the Order of the British Empire (OBE) ===
Royal Navy

- Acting Commander Aubrey Rowland Alston.
- Commander Evelyn Farrance Anderton, HMS Faulknor.
- Commander John Macaulay Arnaud.
- Lieutenant Commander Vernon Edward Barling-Nicholson (Retired), HMS Diomede.
- Paymaster Commander Laurence Arthur Boutwood.
- Commander Samuel Arthur Brooks (Retired), HMS Kingston Jacinth.
- Lieutenant Robert Chudleigh RNR HMT Salvonia.
- Lieutenant Thomas Edward Davies RNR HMS Northern Gift.
- Commander Arthur Hamilton Drake, late of HMS Somali.
- Commander Edward Acton Alcock Gibbon, HMS Devonshire.
- Lieutenant Commander William David Gordon Weir, HMS Vivien.
- Lieutenant Commander James Paul Kinner Griffiths (Retired), HMS Calypso.
- Lieutenant Herbert William Groves.
- Captain Herbert George Hasler RM
- Commander Herbert Leonard Hayes, Fleet Air Arm.
- Lieutenant Herbert Albert Haynes.
- Acting Captain Gervase William Heaton Heaton DSO (Retired).
- Lieutenant Vernon Douglas Hodge, HMS Escapade.
- Lieutenant Commander George William Houchen RNR HMS Northern Foam.
- Commander Hugh Valentine King
- Lieutenant Archibald Frederick Macfie RNR HMS Delhi.
- Temp. Lieutenant John Henry Louis May RNVR HMS Northern Sun.
- Temp. Commander Donald Nicolson RNR HMS Transylvania.
- Paymaster-Commander Norman Leslie Briggs Parker
- Commander James Petrie DSC RNVR
- Lieutenant Commander Walter John Phipps, HMS Woolston.
- Lieutenant Cyril Robert Pilgrim, HMS Ringdove.
- Commander Rowland Kyrle Cecil Pope DSO (Retired).
- Commander Frederick Henry Pugh (Retired), HMS Cardiff.
- Paymaster-Commander Charles Harbottle Rae
- Lieutenant Commander David Byam Shaw (Retired), HMS Transylvania.
- Commander Herbert William Shove DSO (Retired).

Army

- Lieutenant Colonel Stanley Guy Allden DSO Reserve of Officers, Royal Army Service Corps.
- Major Seymour Willoughby Anketell-Jones MC Indian Army Ordnance Corps.
- Major Frederick Rodolph Armitage, The Duke of Wellington's Regiment (West Riding).
- Captain (acting Major) Albert Methuen Bankier DSO MC The Welsh Guards.
- Major Arthur Emerson Barton, Royal Corps of Signals.
- Captain (acting Major) Kennett Bayley, The Oxfordshire and Buckinghamshire Light Infantry.
- Major Francis John Bayliss, Royal Artillery, Territorial Army.
- Lieutenant Colonel Herbert Dacres Beadon MC Royal Corps of Signals.
- Lieutenant Colonel Edward Noble Warburton Birch AMIMechE Royal Army Service Corps.
- Captain (temporary Major) Valentine Boucher, The Buffs (Royal East Kent Regiment).
- Major John James Brough, Royal Army Service Corps.
- Major (acting Lieutenant Colonel) Lionel Bryan Douglas Burns DSO MC Royal Artillery.
- Lieutenant Colonel Henry Moubray Cadell MIMechE Royal Engineers.
- Major Edward Neville Clarke, The Rifle Brigade (Prince Consort's Own).
- Major Frederick William Clarke, Royal Army Service Corps.
- Captain (acting Major) Archibald Arthur Clements AMInstCE Royal Engineers, Territorial Army.
- Lieutenant Colonel Francis Herbert Dallison MC Royal Corps of Signals, Supplementary Reserve.
- Lieutenant Colonel Harold Henry Daw DSO Royal Engineers, Indian Army.
- Captain (acting Major) Peter Hugh de Havilland, Royal Artillery.
- Major John Gordon Deedes MBE Reserve of Officers, Royal Corps of Signals.
- Captain (acting Major) George Taylor Denison Royal Engineers.
- Lieutenant Colonel Thomas Anton Dillon, Extra Regimentally Employed List.
- Major (acting Lieutenant Colonel) Sydney Thomas Divers, Royal Army Service Corps.
- Major Maurice Brian Dowse, Royal Welsh Fusiliers.
- Captain (temporary Major) William Robert Macfarlane Drew, Royal Army Service Corps.
- Major (local Lieutenant Colonel) Alfred Dunstan-Adams MC 1st Battalion, Kenya Regiment (Territorial Force).
- Lieutenant Colonel Brian Bingay Edwards MC Royal Engineers.
- Major (Brevet Lieutenant Colonel) Vyvyan Evelegh, The Duke of Cornwall's Light Infantry.
- Captain (Brevet Major) Richard Philip Hastings Eyre MBE Retired Pay, late Royal Army Service Corps.
- Major (Assistant Paymaster) (temporary Lieutenant Colonel (Staff Paymaster 1st Class)) John Feehally, Royal Army Pay Corps.
- Major (acting Lieutenant Colonel) Claude Frederick Forestier-Walker MC 11th Hussars (Prince Albert's Own) Royal Armoured Corps.
- Major (acting Lieutenant Colonel) Richard Nelson Gale MC The Royal Inniskilling Fusiliers.
- Lieutenant Colonel Bryan Trevor Godfrey-Faussett MC Royal Corps of Signals, Territorial Army.
- Major Robert Ewen Cameron Goff MC The Dorsetshire Regiment.
- Major Richard Marie Joachim Goldie, The King's Own Royal Regiment (Lancaster).
- Major Douglas William Gordon, The Gordon Highlanders. (Appointment to be dated 21 May 1940.).
- Captain (temporary Major) William Douglas McNeil Graham, Royal Artillery.
- Major (Brevet Lieutenant Colonel) (acting Lieutenant Colonel) Philip George Saxon Gregson-Ellis, Grenadier Guards.
- Lieutenant Colonel George William Gumming TD Royal Corps of Signals.
- Major (Brevet Lieutenant Colonel) (acting Lieutenant Colonel) Reginald Kingscote Hewer MC 7th Queen's Own Hussars.
- Captain Anthony Glynn Hildesley, The Royal Berkshire Regiment (Princess Charlotte of Wales's), Territorial Army.
- Major Henry Richard Hopking MBE The Suffolk Regiment (lately Staff Officer, Local Defence Forces in Trinidad).
- Major (temporary Lieutenant Colonel) Harry Ewart Hopthrow, Reserve of Officers, Royal Engineers.
- Lieutenant Colonel Cecil Lee Howard Humphreys TD MInstCE MIMechE Royal Corps of Signals, Territorial Army.
- Major Geoffrey Hamilton Hunt, The Rifle Brigade (Prince Consort's Own).
- Lieutenant Colonel William Francis Jackson MC TD Royal Corps of Signals, Territorial Army.
- Lieutenant Colonel (acting Colonel) Arthur de Brisay Jenkins, Royal Army Service Corps.
- Lieutenant Colonel Samuel Gordon Johnson DSO MC Reserve of Officers, The South Staffordshire Regiment.
- Major (temporary Lieutenant Colonel) (local Colonel) Stanley Oswald Jones MC The Royal Welsh Fusiliers.
- Major (Brevet Lieutenant Colonel) Robert Clifford Jones, Extra Regimentally Employed List.
- Second-Lieutenant (temporary Major) William Bernard Robinson King, Royal Engineers.
- Captain (acting Major) Rudolph Charles Hogg Kirwan, Royal Artillery.
- Lieutenant Colonel Harold Marshall Lambert, Royal Army Service Corps, Territorial Army.
- Major Leonard Lane Lane, The South Lancashire Regiment (Prince of Wales's Volunteers).
- Lieutenant Colonel William Kenneth Muntz Leader MC The Duke of Cornwall's Light Infantry.
- Lieutenant Colonel Bruce Hamer Leeson TD MIEE late Royal Engineers, Territorial Army.
- Major William Henry Lloyd MC Royal Corps of Signals, Territorial Army.
- Major (temporary Lieutenant Colonel) Harry Leicester Longden, The Dorsetshire Regiment.
- Major (acting Lieutenant Colonel) Robert Hillhouse Maclaren MC Royal Engineers.
- Lieutenant Colonel (local Colonel) William MacLean MC Army Educational Corps.
- Lieutenant Colonel Edwyn Sandys Dawes Martin DSO MC 5th Royal Inniskilling Dragoon Guards, Royal Armoured Corps.
- Lieutenant Colonel Geoffrey Lister Matthews TD The Royal Fusiliers (City of London Regiment), Territorial Army.
- Major (acting Lieutenant Colonel) Charles Scott Napier, Royal Engineers.
- Lieutenant Colonel Leslie Burtonshaw Nicholls, Royal Corps of Signals.
- Lieutenant Colonel (Ordnance Officer, 2nd Class) Arthur Isaac Nixon, Royal Army Ordnance Corps.
- Lieutenant Colonel Edward Elwyn Nott-Bower MC Royal Engineers.
- Major (local Lieutenant Colonel) Evelyn John O'Conor MC Royal Tank Regiment, Royal Armoured Corps.
- Lieutenant Colonel Henry Wellington Tuthill Palmer DSO Reserve of Officers, Royal Engineers.
- Major (temporary Lieutenant Colonel) Eric Lloyd Parkes, Royal Engineers.
- Major Ernest Cecil Pepper, The Bedfordshire and Hertfordshire Regiment.
- Lieutenant Colonel William Philip MC TD The Gordon Highlanders, Territorial Army.
- Major (Brevet Lieutenant Colonel) Richard William Francis Poole MC Royal Engineers, Supplementary Reserve.
- Major (Brevet Lieutenant Colonel) (temporary Lieutenant Colonel) William Porter, Royal Engineers.
- Major (acting Lieutenant Colonel) Hubert Elvin Rance, Royal Corps of Signals.
- Captain (Brevet Major) (temporary Major) Walter Henry Dennison Ritchie, Royal Army Service Corps.
- Lieutenant Colonel William Richter Roberts, Royal Engineers (Supplementary Reserve).
- Major (Brevet Lieutenant Colonel) Cecil Bruce Robertson MC The Argyll and Sutherland Highlanders (Princess Louise's).
- Captain (acting Major) Hugh Cuthbert Basset Rogers, Royal Corps of Signals.
- Major Robert Graham, Royal Engineers, Supplementary Reserve.
- Lieutenant Colonel Geoffrey Lillywhite, Royal Army Ordnance Corps, Territorial Army.
- Major (acting Lieutenant Colonel) George Neville Russell, Royal Engineers.
- Major (acting Lieutenant Colonel) George Arthur Sims AMIMechE Royal Army Service Corps.
- Major (Brevet Lieutenant Colonel) John Alexander Sinclair, Royal Artillery.
- Lieutenant Colonel Lionel Francis Sloane-Stanley, late The Herefordshire Regiment, Territorial Army (Major, retired pay), late The Middlesex Regiment (Duke of Cambridge's Own).
- Lieutenant Colonel Robert Stanley Smith MC DCM Royal Corps of Signals (Supplementary Reserve).
- Major Alfred Ernest Snow, The Somerset Light Infantry (Prince Albert's).
- Lieutenant Colonel John Southam Wycherley Stone MC Royal Engineers.
- Major Bryant Gustavus Symes, The Dorsetshire Regiment.
- Major (Brevet Lieutenant Colonel) (acting Lieutenant Colonel) Gerald Walter Robert Templer DSO The Royal Welsh Fusiliers.
- Lieutenant Colonel Gerald Trimmer-Thompson MC The Royal Berkshire Regiment (Princess Charlotte of Wales's), Territorial Army.
- Major (acting Lieutenant Colonel) George Arthur Viner, Royal Army Ordnance Corps.
- Major Frank Williams Vogel, Royal Artillery.
- Lieutenant Colonel Ernest Wentworth Wade DSO Royal Army Medical Corps.
- Major (acting Lieutenant Colonel) Lionel John Walch, Royal Army Service Corps.
- Lieutenant Colonel Herbert Walker MC Royal Army Medical Corps.
- Lieutenant Colonel Frederick Percival Watson TD Royal Army Service Corps, Territorial Army.
- Major (Brevet Lieutenant Colonel) (acting Lieutenant Colonel) Norman Vyvyan Watson, Royal Artillery.
- Major (Brevet Lieutenant Colonel) (temporary Lieutenant Colonel) Philip Geoffrey Whitefoord MBE MC Royal Artillery.
- Major John Percival Whiteley MP Royal Artillery.
- Lieutenant Colonel Gerald Herbert Penn Whitfeld MC The Royal Ulster Rifles.
- Major (temporary Lieutenant Colonel) Walter David Abbott Williams Royal Engineers.
- Major Donald James Wilson-Haffenden, 8th Punjab Regiment, Indian Army.
- Major Maurice James Hartley Wilson, The Queen's Own Cameron Highlanders.
- Major (Brevet Lieutenant Colonel) (temporary Lieutenant Colonel) Thomas John Willoughby Winterton, The Oxfordshire and Buckinghamshire Light Infantry.
- Major (acting Colonel) John Morton Devereux Wood MC Royal Artillery.

Royal Air Force

- Wing Commander Henry Frederick Vulliamy Battle DFC
- Wing Commander Christopher Neil Hope Bilney.
- Squadron Leader (now Acting Wing Commander) Philip Francis Canning.
- Wing Commander Ronald Hartley Carter DFC
- Wing Commander Cecil Ferdinand Chinery.
- Wing Commander Edward Simeon Colbeck Davis AFC
- Squadron Leader Denis Finlay.
- Wing Commander (now Acting Group Captain) Victor Emmanuel Groom DFC
- Wing Commander Harold Alfred Haines DFC
- Wing Commander James Donald Innes Hardman DFC
- Wing Commander George Henry Harrison DFC
- Wing Commander Raymund George Hart MC
- Wing Commander (now Group Captain) Thomas Audley Langford-Sainsbury DFC AFC
- Squadron Leader Edward Roy Pearce.
- Wing Commander Allan Lancelot Addison Perry-Keene.
- Wing Commander Arthur Pethick Revington.
- Wing Commander Geoffrey Ivon Lawrence Saye AFC
- Lieutenant Colonel Kenneth Pearce Smith, The Royal Berkshire Regiment.
- Wing Commander Douglas Arthur William Sugden.
- Squadron Leader (now Wing Commander) Rudolph Trevor Taaffe.
- Wing Commander Thomas Cathcart Traill MC DFC
- Squadron Leader (now Wing Commander) Geoffrey William Turtle DFC
- Wing Commander (now Acting Group Captain) Albert Walters.
- Squadron Leader Gerald Patrick Linton Weston.
- Squadron Leader Frederick Francis Wicks DFC
- Wing Commander (now Group Captain) George Edward Wilson.

Colonies, Protectorates, etc.

- Lieutenant Colonel Tom Baker, E.D., Southern Rhodesia Defence Force.
- Wing Commander Hugh Bartholomew Burrell RNZAF
- Engineer Commander Leopold James Phillimore Carr
- Lieutenant Colonel Albert Edward Conway, New Zealand Staff Corps.
- Major Colin Campbell Blair Gilmour Reserve of Officers, 1st (Singapore) Battalion, Straits Settlements Volunteer Force.
- Wing Commander (temporary Group Captain) Joseph Eric Hewitt RAAF
- Major James George McKay VD New Zealand Military Forces.
- The Reverend George Trevor Robson MC New Zealand Chaplains Department
- Lieutenant Colonel Edmund Osborn Milne DSO VD Australian Military Forces.

British India

- Major Kunwar Deep Chand, Indian Land Forces.
- Major Harold Leo Cunynghame Robertson, 15th Punjab Regiment, Indian Army.
- Major Leonard Algernon Spencer, 19th King George V's Own Lancers, Indian Army.
- Major Edward Samuel Storey-Cooper MC Military Farms Department, India.
- Commander Cecil Lefroy Turbett RIN

=== Member of the Order of the British Empire (MBE) ===
Royal Navy

- Sub-Lieutenant William Atkinson RNR HMS Northern Duke.
- Sub-Lieutenant Ivor Bate RNR HMS Colombo.
- Sub-Lieutenant John Rowland Hodge RNVR HMS Curlew.
- Sub-Lieutenant John Robert Nash RNR HMS Northern Chief.
- Temp. Sub-Lieutenant Harold William Larsen RNVR HMS Northern Princess.
- Commissioned Gunner Alfred James Harvey
- Commissioned Gunner (T) Thomas John Gilbert Davis, HMS Dragon.
- Commissioned Gunner (T) Albert Victor Rowe
- Commissioned Engineer John Henry Rankine, HMS Flamingo.
- Commissioned Telegraphist John Isaac Somers
- Commissioned Master at Arms Charles James Wilmott RN
- Commissioned Wardmaster Lawrence Frederick Gibbons DSM
- Chief Skipper John Carnie Inglis, HMS Sonnet.
- Warrant Shipwright Charles Ernest Rendle DSC
- Warrant Electrician Reginald James Cogswell
- Warrant Engineer Frederick Moore DSM (Retired).
- Warrant Master at Arms Frederick Melbourne Brown
- Temp. Boom Skipper George William Grimmer RNR
- Temp. Boom Skipper Duncan Lownie Souter RNR
- Gunner John Moffat Bell, HMS Valorous.
- Gunner (T) Lawrence Herbert Cotton Creswell, HMS Cossack.
- Gunner (T) William Armstrong Harm, HMS Sikh.
- Signal Boatswain Charles Reed
- Electrical Lieutenant Norman Henry Simmonds
- Telegraphist Lieutenant Bertram Harding
- Commissioned Gunner James Livingstone Pettigrew
- Commissioned Boatswain William James Downing RIN

Army

- Captain Cecil James Frederic Abbott MC Retired Pay, Reserve of Officers, The Manchester Regiment.
- Lieutenant (acting Captain) Desmond Greystoke Allen, Royal Corps of Signals, Territorial Army.
- Captain (Quartermaster) Walter Ambrose, The King's Own Yorkshire Light Infantry.
- Warrant Officer Class I (Staff Sergeant-Major) Henry John Andrews, Royal Army Service Corps.
- Lieutenant (Quartermaster) Hugh James Lauder Archbold, Royal Corps of Signals (Supplementary Reserve).
- Captain Osmund Audley Archdale, Reserve of Officers, General List.
- Warrant Officer Class II (Staff Quartermaster-Sergeant) Harry Edward Atkins, Royal Army Service Corps.
- Warrant Officer Class I (Regimental Sergeant-Major) Herbert John Richard Bailey, Royal Corps of Signals (Supplementary Reserve).
- Captain James Archibald Ballard, The Northamptonshire Regiment.
- Captain (Quartermaster) William Henry Barber, The Sherwood Foresters (Nottinghamshire and Derbyshire Regiment).
- Warrant Officer Class I (Staff Sergeant-Major) Percival Joseph Barlow, Royal Army Service Corps.
- Lieutenant (acting Captain) John Baxendale MC Auxiliary Military Pioneer Corps (Lieutenant, Reserve of Officers, The Loyal Regiment (North Lancashire)).
- Lieutenant (Quartermaster) Thomas Leonard Beattie MM Royal Artillery.
- Captain Douglas Lionel Halcomb Boycott, Reserve of Officers, Royal Army Service Corps.
- Lieutenant William Ian Brinkworth, Field Security Police.
- Captain George Vallette Britten, The Northamptonshire Regiment.
- Lieutenant (Quartermaster) Michael Francis Brown, Auxiliary Military Pioneer Corps.
- Lieutenant (Quartermaster) John Clement Buckland, Welsh Guards.
- Warrant Officer Class I (Sub-Conductor) Edward Bullock, Royal Army Ordnance Corps.
- Warrant Officer Class II (Quartermaster-Sergeant) John Percival Burrage, Royal Engineers.
- Captain George Des Champs Chamier, Royal Artillery.
- Captain (acting Major) Geoffrey Coaker, Royal Engineers (Supplementary Reserve).
- Captain William Blow Gurney Collis Royal Corps of Signals, Territorial Army.
- Warrant Officer Class I (Sergeant-Major) Robert Arthur Cooksey, Corps of Military Police.
- Lieutenant (Quartermaster) Thomas Richard Coyle, Royal Artillery.
- Captain Richard Walter Craddock, The Buffs (Royal East Kent Regiment).
- Lieutenant (acting Captain) Christopher Payne Dawnay, Coldstream Guards.
- Captain (temporary Major) Michael Preston Douglas Dewar, The Buffs (Royal East Kent Regiment).
- Lieutenant (Assistant Ordnance Mechanical Engineer) Stanley John Driscall, Royal Army Ordnance Corps.
- Captain (Ordnance Executive Officer 2nd Class) James Albert Driscoll, Royal Army Ordnance Corps.
- Second-Lieutenant Alan Robert Dyce, Royal Corps of Signals, Supplementary Reserve.
- Captain (Quartermaster) Henry William Fisher MC Royal Artillery, Territorial Army (Reserve of Officers, Royal Artillery).
- Lieutenant John Hugh Fyson Royal Engineers.
- Captain Robert Edward Gabbett Royal Engineers.
- Lieutenant (Assistant Paymaster) Francis Edward Gear, Royal. Army Pay Corps.
- Lieutenant (Quartermaster) Leslie Edward Gibbs, Royal Tank Regiment, Royal Armoured Corps.
- Captain Leonard Young Gibson, Royal Artillery, Territorial Army.
- Captain John Rupert Desmond Gilbert, The East Yorkshire Regiment (The Duke of York's Own).
- Lieutenant (acting Major) Edmund Gillett, Royal Army Medical Corps.
- Captain Herbert Charles Rube Gillman, Royal Artillery.
- Warrant Officer Class I (Conductor) Frederick Gilbert Glover, Royal Army Ordnance Corps.
- Lieutenant (Quarter Master) Edward James Godwin, Royal Artillery (Territorial Army).
- The Reverend James Good Chaplain to the Forces 4th Class, Royal Army Chaplains Department.
- Warrant Officer Class I (Regimental Sergeant-Major) Charles William Goodhand, Army Fire Services.
- Lieutenant (Ordnance Executive Officer 3rd Class) Arthur Hales, Royal Army Ordnance Corps.
- Warrant Officer Class II (Engineer Clerk, Quartermaster-Sergeant) (acting Warrant Officer Class I (Superintending Clerk)) Bert Hill, Royal Engineers.
- Lieutenant (acting Major) John Bartlett Hillary, Reserve of Officers, The Queen's Bays (2nd Dragoon Guards).
- Warrant Officer Class I (Regimental Sergeant-Major) Frederick Roy Himing, Coldstream Guards.
- Captain Albert Edward Hoffman, Royal Engineers (Supplementary Reserve).
- Captain Dudley William Bruce Trower Hogg, The Royal Berkshire Regiment (Princess Charlotte of Wales's).
- Lieutenant Francis Alexander Hough, Royal Corps of Signals (Supplementary Reserve).
- Warrant Officer Class II (Company-Sergeant-Major) Alfred William Hows, The Middlesex Regiment (Duke of Cambridge's Own).
- Captain Richard Foster Milbourn Humphery, The Hampshire Regiment.
- Captain Ronald Ralph Lindsay Hutchinson Royal Engineers.
- Captain Humphrey Ingoldby, Reserve of Officers, The Lincolnshire Regiment.
- Lieutenant (acting Captain) Ronald Malcolm. Kennard, 12th Royal Lancers (Prince of Wales's), Royal Armoured Corps.
- Warrant Officer Class I (Staff Sergeant-Major) Walter George King, Royal Army Service Corps.
- Warrant Officer Class I (Regimental Sergeant-Major) William Lee, The Queen's Bays (2nd Dragoon Guards), Royal Armoured Corps.
- Captain Humphrey King Lewis, Royal Artillery.
- Captain Gerald Gray Oliver Lyons, Royal Artillery.
- Lieutenant (acting Captain) Peter William Marsham, Grenadier Guards.
- Captain (Ordnance Executive Officer 2nd Class) Ernest Thomas Messenger, Royal Army Ordnance Corps.
- Captain Basil Minor, Royal Corps of Signals, Territorial Army.
- Warrant Officer Class I (Regimental Sergeant-Major) Thomas Edward Morgan, Corps of Military Police.
- Lieutenant (Quartermaster) Ernest Moss, Royal Army Service Corps.
- Second-Lieutenant (acting Captain) William Edward Newbold, Royal Engineers.
- Lieutenant Gustavus Henry March-Phillipps, Regular Army Reserve of Officers, Royal Artillery.
- Captain John Edward Thompson Pirn, The Lincolnshire Regiment.
- Second-Lieutenant (acting Captain) Vincent Poole, General List.
- Lieutenant (Quartermaster) Joseph William Price, Royal Army Medical Corps.
- Lieutenant (Quartermaster) John William Massey Purcell, The Royal Northumberland Fusiliers.
- Second-Lieutenant William Leonard Renecle, Royal Corps of Signals, Supplementary Reserve.
- Enid Grace Mary Reynolds, Sister, Queen Alexandra's Imperial Military Nursing Service.
- Captain (Ordnance Executive Officer 2nd Class) John Sedgwick, Royal Army Ordnance Corps.
- Captain George Nelson Hookey Sheffield, The Essex Regiment.
- Warrant Officer Class I (Regimental Sergeant-Major) Ernest Sinclair, Royal Engineers (Supplementary Reserve).
- Second-Lieutenant (acting Captain) Ran Kendal Stewart-Smith, General List.
- Captain Robert Tudor Smith, The Cheshire Regiment.
- Captain David Maitland Smyth, Royal Corps of Signals.
- Second Lieutenant (acting Captain) Herbert Bland Stokes, General List.
- Lieutenant (Quartermaster) William Charles Street, Royal Army Service Corps.
- Lieutenant (Quartermaster) Charles Surridge, Royal Artillery.
- Warrant Officer Class I (Staff Sergeant-Major) James William Troy, Royal Army Service Corps.
- Captain (Quartermaster) Henry Bremner Turnbull DCM The King's Own Scottish Borderers.
- Captain Noel Edmond Viner Viner-Brady, Royal Engineers (Supplementary Reserve).
- Lieutenant (Quartermaster) Reginald Joseph Vosser, The Bedfordshire & Hertfordshire Regiment.
- Lieutenant (Quartermaster) Richard Stanley Walker, Grenadier Guards.
- Warrant Officer Class II (Battery Sergeant-Major) (acting Warrant Officer Class I (Regimental Sergeant-Major)) Maurice Joseph Walsh, Royal Artillery.
- Warrant Officer Class I (Staff Sergeant-Major) William Westcott, Royal Army Pay Corps.
- Temp. Lieutenant (temporary Captain) William Harold Mortimer Wilcox, Royal Army Service Corps.
- Lieutenant (acting Captain) Cyril Tennant Williams, Royal Corps of Signals.
- Warrant Officer Class II (Staff Quartermaster-Sergeant) (acting Warrant Officer Class I (Staff-Sergeant-Major)) Thomas Ernest Woolgar, Royal Army Service Corps.
- Captain Hugh Williams, Royal Army Service Corps, Territorial Army.
- Captain Frederick George Wintle, Royal Artillery
- Major (Ordnance Executive Officer 1st Class) Henry Cecil Andrews, Retired Pay, late Royal Army Ordnance Corps.
- Captain (Quartermaster) Joseph George Bale, The Royal Scots Fusiliers.
- Warrant Officer Class II (Company Sergeant-Major) (local Warrant Officer Class I (Regimental Sergeant-Major)) Bertram Oliver Bennett, The Highland Light Infantry (City of Glasgow Regiment) (attached Sudan Defence Force).
- Captain Frank William Percy Bradford, Royal Corps of Signals.
- Lieutenant (Quartermaster) Frederick Arthur Burridge, Extra Regimentally Employed List.
- Lieutenant (Quartermaster) William Dunlop Carroll, General List.
- Warrant Officer Class II (Regimental Quartermaster-Sergeant) Bernard Leoph Laverock Carter, The Wiltshire Regiment (Duke of Edinburgh's).
- Captain William Cherry, The Highland Light Infantry (City of Glasgow Regiment), Territorial Army.
- Captain (Inspector of Permanent Communications) William Clark, Royal Corps of Signals.
- Warrant Officer Class II (Company Sergeant-Major) (acting Warrant Officer Class I (Regimental Sergeant-Major)) William John Clarke, The Royal Inniskilling Fusiliers.
- Warrant Officers Class I (Staff Sergeant-Major) Charles William Coates, Royal Army Service Corps.
- Major John Cockburn-Cockburn, The Argyll and Sutherland Highlanders (Princess Louise's).
- Captain (Quartermaster) Charles Henry Dady DCM late The Sherwood Foresters (Nottinghamshire and Derbyshire Regiment) Territorial Army.
- Captain Sidney John Dagg Royal Corps of Signals.
- Captain Averell John Daniell, Royal Artillery.
- Warrant Officer Class I (Conductor) Edward Richard Daw, Indian Army Ordnance Corps.
- Warrant Officer Class I (Regimental Sergeant-Major) David Edward Dean, late Royal Army Medical Corps.
- Major Walter James Dynes, Royal Engineers.
- Captain and Adjutant Arthur Isidore Fleuret, Falkland Islands Defence Force.
- Lieutenant (Quartermaster) Frank Victor Francis, Royal Army Service Corps.
- The Reverend John Annand Fraser Chaplain to the Forces 4th Class, Royal Army Chaplains Department, Territorial Army.
- Warrant Officer Class I (Staff-Sergeant-Major) William Leonard Glanville, Permanent Staff, New Zealand Military Forces.
- Temp. Lieutenant (acting Captain) George Adam Henderson, Royal Engineers.
- Lieutenant (acting Captain) Percival Clayton Marsden Kingston Royal Engineers.
- Warrant Officer Class II (Foreman of Signals) Arthur William Holt, Royal Corps of Signals.
- Lieutenant (Ordnance Executive Officer 3rd Class) Frederick Christian Fothergill Horey, Royal Army Ordnance Corps.
- Warrant Officer Class I (Mechanist Sergeant-Major (Artificer)) Robert Hutchison, Royal Army Service Corps.
- Major (acting Lieutenant Colonel) Walter Henry Victor Jones, The Middlesex Regiment (Duke of Cambridge's Own).
- Captain (Assistant Paymaster) Harry King, Royal Army Pay Corps.
- Major (Ordnance Officer 3rd Class) Harold Francis Sylvester King, Royal Army Ordnance Corps.
- Captain Alexander Edward John, Viscount Knebworth, The Queen's Bays (2nd Dragoon Guards).
- Second-Lieutenant (temporary Captain) Harry Douglas Lamond, General List.
- Captain Arthur Gordon Poynter Leahy Royal Engineers.
- Company Sergeant-Major Richard Francis William Leonard, 1st (Singapore) Battalion, Straits Settlements Volunteer Force.
- Major Thomas Alexander Martin, The Essex Regiment.
- Major (Ordnance Executive Officer 1st Class) Henry Thomas May, Retired Pay, late Royal Army Ordnance Corps.
- Captain (Quartermaster) Thomas William Miller, The North Staffordshire Regiment (The Prince of Wales's), Territorial Army.
- Major Ernest John Montgomery, The Highland Light Infantry (City of Glasgow Regiment).
- Lieutenant (Ordnance Executive Officer 3rd Class) James Malcolm Noble, Royal Army Ordnance Corps.
- Warrant Officer Class II (Armament Quartermaster-Sergeant) Edward Ernest Parrott, Royal Ordnance Corps.
- Warrant Officer Class I (Foreman of Signals) (Sergeant-Major) Thomas Paterson, Royal Corps of Signals.
- Warrant Officer Class. I (Superintending Draughtsman) Robert Thomas Pepperdine, Royal Engineers.
- Major (Quartermaster) Norman Henry Pratt TD The Yorkshire Hussars (Alexandra, Princess of Wales's Own) Yeomanry, Territorial Army.
- Captain (Quartermaster) (acting Major) William Price MM Extra Regimentally Employed List.
- Lieutenant (Assistant Ordnance Mechanical Engineer) Robert Reid AMIMechE Royal Army Ordnance Corps.
- Warrant Officer Class I (Superintending Clerk) Edward Martin Richardson, Royal Engineers.
- Captain (acting Major) Richard Malcolm Roberts, Reserve of Officers, The King's Own Yorkshire Light Infantry.
- Captain and Adjutant Charles Granville Robinson, Royal Artillery, Territorial Army.
- Captain William Gordon Roe, Royal Army Service Corps.
- Lieutenant (Assistant Ordnance Mechanical Engineer) Hammond James Rotton, Royal Army Ordnance Corps.
- Lieutenant Richard Vernon Russell, The East Lancashire Regiment.
- Lieutenant (District Officer) Charles Thomas Skeats, Royal Artillery.
- Temp. Lieutenant (Quartermaster) Albert Edwin Smart, Royal Corps of Signals.
- Major Henry Nevill Sowdon, Royal Artillery.
- Lieutenant (Quartermaster) Alfred Standing, Royal Artillery, Territorial Army.
- Captain (acting Major) Edward William Stevens, The Duke of Wellington's Regiment (West Riding).
- Captain (temporary Major) Gwynne Brian Sugden, The South Wales Borderers.
- Quartermaster and Honorary Major Albert William Taylor MC Australian Military Forces.
- Captain William Francis Kynaston Thompson, Royal Artillery.
- Major Charles Gordon Campbell Wade, The Royal Fusiliers (City of London Regiment).
- Major Christopher Prioleau Warren MC The Rifle Brigade (Prince Consort's Own).
- Captain Philip James Woodhouse, The King's Shropshire Light Infantry, Territorial Army.
- Major Frederick Wren, Army Educational Corps.

Royal Air Force

- Flight Lieutenant John Wesley Caddy
- Flight Lieutenant Ernest Joseph Dease, Volunteer Reserve.
- Acting Flight Lieutenant Francis Charles Howard Kirby
- Flying Officer George Stephen Drake
- Flying Officer David Edwards
- Flying Officer John Fanning
- Flying Officer William Hubert George Hampshire
- Flying Officer Leonard Scullard
- Warrant Officer George Frederick Claydon
- Warrant Officer Charles Victor Guest
- Warrant Officer Frederick Hugh Ross Hazel
- Warrant Officer William John Hendley
- Warrant Officer Albert Benjamin Knowles
- Warrant Officer William John Marshall
- Warrant Officer Stephen Robin Newton
- Warrant Officer Edwin Sydney Oliver
- Warrant Officer William Charles Ray
- Warrant Officer Horace John Searle
- Flying Officer (now Acting Flight Lieutenant) Alec Baden Kendall
- Flying Officer Harry Leslie Millyard
- Flying Officer Colin Scragg
- Warrant Officer Montague Kemp
- Warrant Officer Frederick James Daniel Oldland
- Warrant Officer Edward Arthur Pacello
- Warrant Officer William Dillarstone Richardson
- Warrant Officer Albert William Usher
- Warrant Officer David Temple Way

British India

- Subadar-Major and Honorary Captain, James Jati Ram, 8th Punjab Regiment, Indian Army.
- Warrant Officer. Class I (Conductor) James Richard Bowen, Indian Army Ordnance Corps.
- Jemadar (honorary Risaldar) Ali Raza, Governor-General's Bodyguard, India.
- Captain John Henry Smith, Ceylon Defence Force.
- Subadar-Major Bhagwat Parshad Sharma, King George's Royal Indian Military School.
- Warrant Officer Class I (Conductor) Frederick Arthur Woodhouse, Indian Army Corps of Clerks.
- Lieutenant (Quartermaster) John Ernest Murphy, Special List, Indian Army.
- Jemadar Saiyid Muhammad Ahmad Naqvi, Indian Medical Department, attached Iraq Levies.
- Lieutenant (local Captain) Leslie Arthur Jones, The Ceylon Army Service Corps.
- Captain (Quartermaster) Kenneth Ewart Kellar, Ceylon Engineers.

Colonies, Protectorates, etc.

- Captain (acting Major) Joseph Vincent Abela, Royal Malta Artillery.
- Quartermaster and Honorary Captain George Samuel Baker, Australian Military Forces.
- Warrant Officer James Edward Duncan RNZAF
- Flying Officer Albert Tom Giles RNZAF
- Flying Officer Charles Roy Hackfath RAAF
- Squadron Sergeant-Major Charles Ethelbert Howell, Canterbury Yeomanry Cavalry, New Zealand Military Forces.
- Flight Lieutenant Ivan Edward Rawnsley RNZAF
- Sergeant Major, Class I, Samuel Harland Woodburn Upton RAAF
- Warrant Officer Class I (Regimental Sergeant-Major) Frank Allan Wetherall, Royal New Zealand Artillery, New Zealand Military Forces.
- Quartermaster and Honorary Major Bruce Wilson, Australian Military Forces.
- Battery Sergeant-Major Douglas Wilson, Singapore Royal Artillery Volunteers, Straits Settlements Volunteer Force.

Honorary Member

- Mulazim Sidky Deeb Ifen, Trans-Jordan Frontier Force.

== British Empire Medal (BEM) ==
For Meritorious Service

- Sergeant William Archer, Royal Artillery, Territorial Army.
- Sergeant (temporary Battery Quarter-Master-Sergeant) Leonard Royston Bartlett, Royal Artillery.
- Staff Sergeant (acting Warrant Officer Class I, Staff-Sergeant-Major) Arthur Bell, Royal Army Service Corps.
- Armament Staff-Sergeant Clifford Charles Vernon Bramble, Royal Army Ordnance Corps.
- Sergeant William Joseph Cuffe, Royal Army Service Corps.
- Sergeant Clifton Edward Ellis RAF
- Colour-Sergeant Charles George Forester, The Queen's Own Royal West Kent Regiment.
- Sergeant Patrick Gallagher, The Highland Light Infantry (City of Glasgow Regiment), Territorial Army
- Sergeant (now Flight Sergeant) Albert John Gilbert RAF
- Battery Quartermaster-Sergeant Frank Hawker, Royal Artillery, Territorial Army.
- Sergeant Stanley Charles Ivatt, Royal Army Service Corps.
- Sergeant Thomas Sidney Joughin, Royal Army Service Corps.
- Staff-Sergeant (acting Warrant Officer Class II (Quartermaster-Sergeant)) John Knecht, Royal Army Medical Corps.
- Flight Sergeant Francis Drake Luke RAF
- Private Edward Lynch, The King's Regiment (Liverpool)
- Colour-Sergeant (Orderly Room Sergeant) James McBain, The Highland Light Infantry (City of Glasgow Regiment) Territorial Army.
- Corporal Harold Monkman RAF
- Staff-Sergeant (acting Warrant Officer Class I (Staff-Sergeant-Maior) Norman Phillips, Royal Army Service Corps.
- Staff-Sergeant (acting Warrant Officer Class II (Staff Quartermaster-Sergeant)) William Alfred Randall, Royal Army Service Corps.
- Lance-Sergeant William Rawcliffe, The King's Regiment (Liverpool).
- Sergeant Ernest Thomas Rushworth RAF
- Staff-Sergeant Geoffrey Rupert Spence, Royal Army Pay Corps.
- Flight Sergeant William Charles James Starling RAF

For Meritorious Service — in recognition of services in the war

- Chief Petty Officer Thomas Leonard Baskerville (Pensioner), (TGM).
- Chief Petty Officer Jeremiah Thomas Cahalane, HMS Royal Arthur.
- Chief Petty Officer William Henry Joseph Lacey, HMS Scotstoun.
- Chief Petty Officer Robert Mackenzie, HMS Scotstoun.
- Chief Petty Officer Ernest Edward Miles.
- Chief Petty Officer Albert Leslie Mould (Pensioner).
- Chief Yeoman of Signals Benjamin Charles Bates.
- Chief Yeoman of Signals Walter Robert Bloomfield.
- Chief Yeoman of Signals William Charles Collett.
- Chief Yeoman of Signals George Edward Files (Pensioner).
- Chief Yeoman of Signals Ernest Gordon Thomas Fincham.
- Chief Petty Officer Telegraphist Ernest Edward Goldsmith.
- Chief Petty Officer Telegraphist James Arthur Williams.
- Chief Engine Room Artificer 1st Class Stanley Ball, HMS Ark Royal.
- Chief Engine Room Artificer 1st Class John Richard Hess, HMS Caledon.
- Chief Engine Room Artificer 2nd Class Reginald George Barraball HMS Escapade.
- Chief Engine Room Artificer 2nd Class Edwin William Newman, HMS Delhi.
- Chief Engine Room Artificer 2nd Class Jack Thorpe HMS Widgeon.
- Engine Room Artificer 1st Class Lawrence Gilbert Carpenter, HMS Calypso.
- Chief Stoker Sidney Thomas Marsh.
- Chief Electrical Artificer 1st Class Walter Leslie Tozer, HMS Cossack.
- Electrical Artificer 1st Class Frank Arthur Brown, HMS Sikh.
- Chief Joiner Frederick Cooper.
- Chief Petty Officer Writer Alexander Anderson.
- Chief Petty Officer Writer William Charles Bond DSM
- Chief Petty Officer Writer Stanley Ennew Crickmore.
- Chief Petty Officer Writer William Smith Curnow.
- Chief Petty Officer Writer Samuel Hector Distin.
- Chief Petty Officer Writer Victor Edward Holley.
- Chief Petty Officer Writer Edward Thomas Matthews (Pensioner).
- Chief Petty Officer Writer Ernest James Reynolds (Pensioner).
- Chief Petty Officer Writer Arthur George Roberts (Pensioner).
- Chief Petty Officer Writer Arthur Thomas Squibb (Pensioner).
- Chief Petty Officer Writer Phillip Stanley Tank.
- Chief Petty Officer Writer John Wynard Vokes.
- Supply Chief Petty Officer Frederick Harold Isaacs.
- Master-at-Arms Jesse James Hoare.
- Master-at-Arms Ralph Frederick Moyse DSM
- Chief Petty Officer Cook Ronald Harry Taylor.
- Chief Engineman John Stansfield, HMS Northern Gift.
- Chief Engineman Thomas Henry Morgan, HMS Kingston Beryl.
- Petty Officer John Ward Meadows.
- Petty Officer Josiah John William Perrott.
- Petty Officer Sidney John Potter.
- Petty Officer Frederick Albert Cecil Scott.
- Acting Petty Officer Telegraphist Stanley Gaynor, HMS Gurkha.
- Acting Leading Writer Francis Leslie Pitt RNVR
- Leading Seaman Thomas Charles Barton RNR HMS Kingston Jacinth.
- Leading Seaman Frederick Charles Brush, Royal Fleet Reserve. HMS Caledon.
- Leading Seaman Sidney William Alfred Charleton RNVR
- Leading Seaman Thomas Edward Henderson RNR HMS Northern Princess.
- Acting Leading Seaman John Hugh French, HMS Suffolk.
- Telegraphist Andrew Galley HMS Aquamarine.
- Able Seaman Alfred Clode, HMS Diomede.
- Able Seaman Erskine Eric Knox Stormer RNVR
- Seaman Davis Hunter RNR HMS Diomede.
- Seaman Angus MacDonald RNR (P.S.), H.M. Drifter Gleam On.
- Seaman William George McKay, HMS Northern Dawn.
- Seaman John McMillan RNR HMS Kingston Onyx.
- Seaman Thomas John Patrick Murphy RNR HMS Northern Gift.
- Sergeant Rennick Steer RM Chatham.
- Marine Trevor Edward Haine, Portsmouth.
- Flight Sergeant Alfred Arthur HayRAF
- Flight Sergeant Malcolm OrmandyRAF

For Meritorious Service — in recognition of services in the field

- Corporal (acting Lance-Sergeant). Horatio Bedford, Royal Army Medical Corps.
- Lance-Corporal (acting Corporal) Leslie Stanley Beland, Royal Engineers, Supplementary Reserve.
- Sergeant Roy Brackley Cherrill, Royal Corps of Signals, Supplementary Reserve.
- Sergeant Frederick Leonard. Craddock, Royal Corps of Signals, Supplementary Reserve.
- Sergeant William Alfred Cubitt, Royal Engineers.
- Sergeant (acting Staff-Sergeant) Peter Currie, Royal Army Medical Corps.
- Corporal Raymond George Curtis, Royal Engineers.
- Fusilier Andrew Daly, 2nd Battalion, The Royal Inniskilling Fusiliers.
- Driver William Arthur Darby, Royal Army Service Corps.
- Corporal Norman William Day, Royal Engineers.
- Sergeant (acting Staff-Sergeant) Frank Edward Dorey, Royal Army Ordnance Corps.
- Sergeant James Douglas, Royal Army Service Corps.
- Staff-Sergeant Norman Duncombe, Royal Engineers.
- Company Quartermaster-Sergeant John William Ferris, Royal Engineers.
- Company Quartermaster-Sergeant Albert Edward Fox, The Loyal Regiment.
- Sergeant Charles Berona. Fraughen, Royal Irish Fusiliers.
- Sergeant Edward Frederick Penman Gantzer, Royal Army Medical Corps.
- Corporal James Arthur Garnett, Royal Corps of Signals.
- Sergeant John Goodrick, Royal Corps of Signals, Supplementary Reserve.
- Sergeant Albert Edward Hardy, Corps of Military Police.
- Lance-Corporal Edward Hewson, Royal Corps of Signals, Supplementary Reserve.
- Corporal (acting Sergeant) Kenneth Shirley Houchin, Royal Engineers, Supplementary Reserve.
- Sergeant John Walter Hurren, Royal Engineers, Supplementary Reserve.
- Armament Staff-Sergeant Cecil James Jardine, Royal Army Ordnance Corps.
- Private (acting Lance-Corporal) Ronald Walker Jay, Royal Army Service Corps, Supplementary Reserve.
- Sergeant Reginald James Lacy, 2nd Searchlight Regiment, Royal Artillery.
- Sergeant (Artillery Clerk) William Jack Lawer, Royal Artillery.
- Sergeant Arthur Richard Reginald Lerwill, Royal Engineers, Supplementary Reserve.
- Lance-Corporal Henry Hamilton McGosh, Royal Corps of Signals, Supplementary Reserve.
- Signalman John Joseph McLeod, Royal Corps of Signals, Supplementary Reserve.
- Corporal (acting Lance-Sergeant) Thomas McPherson, Royal Army Ordnance Corps.
- Sergeant George Murison McRae, Corps of Military Police.
- Driver William James McWilliams, Royal Army Service Corps.
- Lance-Sergeant Hugh Colin Mayor, 3oth Field Regiment, Royal Artillery.
- Sergeant Richard Oliver Newby, 2nd Searchlight Regiment, Royal Artillery.
- Corporal William Pallister, Royal Engineers, Supplementary Reserve.
- Corporal (acting Sergeant) Charles Alfred Payne, Royal Army Ordnance Corps.
- Battery Quartermaster-Sergeant Ronald Arthur Raddon, 22nd Field Regiment, Royal Artillery.
- Signalman Walter John Salter, Royal Corps of Signals.
- Sergeant John Jack Simpson, Royal Army Service Corps.
- Lance-Bombardier Robert Slack, 92nd (5th London) Field Regiment, Royal Artillery, Territorial Army.
- Sapper William Boddington Smith, Royal Engineers, Supplementary Reserve.
- Lance-Corporal (acting Corporal) Montford George Southall, Royal Corps of Signals.
- Company Quartermaster-Sergeant George Spencer, The Highland Light Infantry (City of Glasgow Regiment).
- Battery Quartermaster-Sergeant Charles Thomas, 10th Field Regiment, Royal Artillery.
- Sergeant George Vipond Thwaites, Royal Army Service Corps, Supplementary Reserve.
- Company Quartermaster-Sergeant Frederick Roland Townsend, Royal Engineers, Supplementary Reserve.
- Sergeant Hubert William Kitchens Treloar, Royal Corps of Signals.
- Driver Harold Tumbull, Royal Army Service Corps.
- Sergeant George Frederick Tyson, Royal Army Service Corps, Supplementary Reserve.
- Sergeant (acting Colour Sergeant) (Orderly Room Sergeant) Harry Gordon Vince, East Surrey Regiment.
- Corporal (acting Sergeant) Arthur William John Whitehead, Royal Engineers, Supplementary Reserve.
- Lance-Corporal (acting Corporal) Donald Wilkinson, Royal Engineers.

For Meritorious Service — in recognition of services rendered in recent operations

- Flight Sergeant Herbert George Christmas RAF
- Flight Sergeant Cyril Havelock John Clampitt RAF
- Flight Sergeant William Noel Gibson RAF
- Flight Sergeant Edward Johnson RAF
- Flight Sergeant Percy William Nunn RAF
- Flight Sergeant Joseph Restall Ross RAF
- Corporal (now Sergeant) John Brown Stoneman RAF

== Distinguished Service Order (DSO) ==
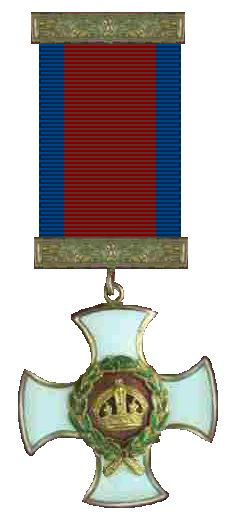
Riband and medal for the Distinguished Service Order

For gallant and distinguished services in action in connection with recent operations
Royal Navy

- Commander Anthony Wass Buzzard RN, HMS Gurkha.
- Captain George Elvey Creasy MVO RN
- Commander Henry Bramhall Ellison RN, HMS Fowey.
- Commander Mark Fogg-Elliott RN, HMS Delight.
- Commander Harry Robert Graham RN, HMS Escapade.
- Commander Leslie Griffiths RNR HMS Sheafcrest.
- Lieutenant Commander John Lee-Barber RN, HMS Griffin.
- Captain Philip John Mack RN, HMS Jervis.
- Lieutenant Commander Colin Douglas Maud DSC RN HMS Icarus. (Bar to the Distinguished Service Cross.)
- Commander Hugh St. Lawrence Nicolson RN, HMS Hyperion.
- Commander Frank Reginald Woodbine Parish RN, HMS Vivacious.
- Commander Frederick Thornton Peters DSO DSC HMS Thirlmere. (Bar to the Distinguished Service Cross.)
- Commander John Williams Darner Powell DSC RD RNR (Bar to the Distinguished Service Cross.)
- Lieutenant Commander Richard Taylor White RN, HMS Antelope.
- Captain Percy Todd RN, HMS Inglefield.

Army

- Major General Frank Noel Mason-MacFarlane CB MC late Royal Artillery.
- Colonel (temporary Brigadier) John Atherton Churchill MC ADC late The Durham Light Infantry.
- Colonel (temporary Brigadier) William Robb MC late The King's Own Yorkshire Light Infantry.
- Colonel (acting Brigadier) Montagu George North Stopford MC late The Rifle Brigade (Prince Consort's Own).
- Colonel (acting Brigadier) James Stuart Steele MC late The Royal Ulster Rifles.
- The Reverend Alfred Thomas Arthur Naylor, C.F. 1st Class OBE Royal Army Chaplains Department.
- Lieutenant Colonel (acting Brigadier) Miles Christopher Dempsey MC The Royal Berkshire Regiment (Princess Charlotte of Wales's).
- Lieutenant Colonel Norman Annesley Coxwell-Rogers OBE Royal Engineers.
- Lieutenant Colonel John Ross Kennedy AMInstCE Royal Engineers, Territorial Army.
- Lieutenant Colonel Arnold de Lerisson Cazenove MVO Coldstream Guards.
- Lieutenant Colonel Charles Norman Littleboy MC TD The Green Howards (Alexandra, Princess of Wales's Own Yorkshire Regiment), Territorial Army.
- Lieutenant Colonel Hugh Francis D'Assisi Stuart Law MC The Border Regiment, Territorial Army (Captain, Reserve of Officers, Irish Guards).
- Major (Brevet Lieutenant Colonel) Roy Martin Jerram MC Royal Tank Regiment, Royal Armoured Corps.
- Major (acting Lieutenant Colonel) William Revell Revell-Smith MC AM Royal Artillery.
- Major (acting Lieutenant Colonel) Henry Shakespear Thuillier, Royal Artillery.
- Major (acting Lieuitenant-Colonel) Henry Ayerst Young, Royal Artillery.
- Major (acting Lieutenant Colonel) Desmond Harrison, Royal Engineers.
- Major (Brevet Lieutenant Colonel) (temporary Lieutenant Colonel) Frank Ernest Wallace Simpson, Royal Engineers.
- Major (acting Lieutenant Colonel) Thomas Frederick Given MC The East Yorkshire Regiment (Duke of York's Own).
- Major (acting Lieutenant Colonel) James Charles Abbott Birch, The Bedfordshire and Hertfordshire Regiment.
- Major (Brevet Lieutenant Colonel) (acting Lieutenant Colonel) Hayman John Hayman-Joyce, The Border Regiment.
- Major (acting Lieutenant Colonel) Farrar Robert Horton Morgan, The Border Regiment (attached The Royal Sussex Regiment).
- Major (acting Lieutenant Colonel) Lashmer Gordon Whistler, The Royal Sussex Regiment.
- Major (acting Lieutenant Colonel) John William Hinchcliffe, The Northamptonshire Regiment.
- Major (acting Lieutenant Colonel) Arthur Alexander Ernest Chitty, The Queen's Own Royal West Kent Regiment.
- Major (acting Lieutenant Colonel) Richard Bryans MC The King's Shropshire Light Infantry.
- Major (Brevet Lieutenant Colonel) (acting Brigadier) Cecil William Haydon MC The Middlesex Regiment (Duke of Cambridge's Own).
- Major (Brevet Lieutenant Colonel) John Francis Hare, The King's Royal Rifle Corps.
- Major (Brevet Lieutenant Colonel) (acting Lieutenant Colonel) Charles Dawson Moorhead, The Manchester Regiment.
- Major (acting Lieutenant Colonel) Ross Scott McLaren, The Durham Light Infantry, Territorial Army.
- Major (acting Lieutenant Colonel) Fergus Y. Carson Knox, The Royal Ulster Rifles.
- Major Jack Russell Carmichael Christopher, Royal Artillery.
- Major Harold Edwin Collet-White, Royal Artillery.
- Major Edwin Otway Herbert, Royal Artillery.
- Major Kenelm Horwood, Royal Artillery, Territorial Army.
- Major Montacute William Wyrrall Selby-Lowndes, Royal Artillery.
- Major John Roddam Stanton, Royal Artillery, Territorial Army.
- Major Kenneth McKenzie Cameron, Royal Engineers, Territorial Army.
- Major William Henry Rowe, The Buffs (Royal East Kent Regiment).
- Major George Philip Clark, The Northamptonshire Regiment.
- Major Horace Edward Rew, The Royal Berkshire Regiment (Princess Charlotte of Wales's).
- Major Colin Muir Barber, The Queen's Own Cameron Highlanders.
- Major Robert Malcolm Riach, The Queen's Own Cameron Highlanders.
- Captain (temporary Lieutenant Colonel) The Viscount Bridgeman MC (late The Rifle Brigade, Prince Consort's Own).
- Captain (Brevet Major) (acting Lieutenant Colonel) Ivor Thomas Percival Hughes MC The Queen's Royal Regiment (West Surrey).
- Captain (temporary Major) Reginald Peregrine Harding, 5th Royal Inniskilling Dragoon Guards, Royal Armoured Corps.
- Captain (acting Major) Henry Hastings Cavendish Withers, Royal Engineers.

== Distinguished Service Cross (DSC) ==
- Commander Walter Roger Marshall-A'Deane, HMS Greyhound.
- Commander Conrad Byron Alers-Hankey, HMS Vanquisher.
- Commander Edward Reignier Conder, HMS Whitshed.
- Commander Rafe Edward Courage, HMS Havock.
- Commander John Henry Ruck-Keene, HMS Scarborough.
- Commander John Petter Dobson RD
- Lieutenant Commander John Frederick Barker, HMS Ardent.
- Lieutenant Commander John Bostock, HMS Escort.
- Lieutenant Commander Dennis Royle Farquharson Cambell Fleet Air Arm.
- Lieutenant Commander Paul Morrison Bushe Chavasse, HMS Princess Victoria.
- Lieutenant Commander John Glutton-Baker, HMS Somali.
- Lieutenant Commander Peter Charles Oswald Moseley, HMS Codrington.
- Lieutenant Commander Michael Southcote Townsend OBE HMS Viscount.
- Lieutenant Commander Eric Alonzo Stocker, HMS Vanessa.
- Lieutenant Commander John Leslie Young-husband, HMS Wildswan.
- Lieutenant Commander Harry Whittaker Brammall HMT Kurd.
- Lieutenant Commander Richard Vere Essex Case, HMS Stella Capella.
- Lieutenant Commander Eric Morrison Mackay, HMS Derby County.
- Lieutenant Allan Wilfrid Iles, Royal Navy (Retired), HMS Glasgow.
- Lieutenant David Oswald Smith, HMS Gurkha.
- Lieutenant Leslie Alfred Hill, HMS Sicyon.
- Lieutenant Albert Longmuir, HMS Watchful.
- Lieutenant Robert Stevenson Miller, HMS Lynx.
- Temp. Lieutenant Arthur Douglas Parkinson
- Temp. Lieutenant Brian John Parmenter Kelly HMT St. Donats.
- Temp. Lieutenant Alfred Clifford Weeks, HMS Grade Fields.
- Sub-Lieutenant Michael Travers Marwood, HMS Antelope.
- Sub-Lieutenant Christopher Edward Martin Preston, HMS Delight.
- Sub-Lieutenant David Johnstone Hutton, HMS Tamarisk.
- Sub-Lieutenant Philip George Mugford MC HMD Scourge.
- Chief Skipper John Wilson RD HMT Rutlandshire.
- Skipper William Boyle HMD Young Jacob.
- Skipper Peter Buchan HMT Tamora.
- Skipper Edmond Allan Reynolds Chilton HMT Ohm.
- Skipper Victor Frederick Holness HMT Regardo.
- Skipper George Thomas Lilley HMT Kirkella.
- Skipper Eric George Littler HMT Indian Star.
- Skipper Thomas Henry Masters Lowery HMT Thomas Altoft.
- Skipper Joseph Allan Prettyman HMT Gadfly.
- Skipper John Alexander Sutherland HMT Pelton.
- Commissioned Gunner (T) Arthur George Gentry, HMS Sandhurst.

== Distinguished Service Medal (DSM) ==
- Chief Petty Officer Frederick James Snowling.
- Chief Petty Officer Thomas George Street, HMS Basilisk.
- Electrical Artificer 1st Class Phillip Arthur England, HMS Exeter.
- Engine-Room Artificer 1st Class Geoffrey James Bartlett, HMS Keith.
- Shipwright 3rd Class Ronald Francis Atwill, HMS Exeter.
- Petty Officer Walter Brockwell, HMS Calcutta.
- Petty Officer Ralph William Claridge, HMS Paragon.
- Petty Officer Leonard Cotmore, HMSVanessa.
- Petty Officer Thomas Alfred Foot, HMS Sandhurst.
- Petty Officer Frederick Edward Kidd, HMS Paragon.
- Petty Officer Charles William Knight, HMS Pelican.
- Petty Officer Ernest George Linfield, HMS Hampton.
- Petty Officer Alec David Oliver, HMS Cossack.
- Petty Officer John Walter Sharpe, HMS Glasgow.
- Petty Officer Frederick Joseph Venning Voss, HMS Viscount.
- Petty Officer Samuel Harvey, HMT Northern Duke.
- Petty Officer Neil McLean Speed, HMT Grade Fields.
- Acting Petty Officer Herbert James Brown Button, HMS Antelope.
- Engine-Room Artificer 4th Class Arthur Stanley Crowston, HMS Glasgow.
- Engine-Room Artificer 4th Class Arthur Charles Stephens, HMS Exeter.
- Joiner 1st Class Percival Samuel Davies, HMS Belfast.
- Leading Seaman Mark Stanley Allen, HMT Europa.
- Leading Seaman Shepherd James Frederick Empson, HMS Vanquisher.
- Leading Seaman William John Rees Gumbleton, HMS Exeter.
- Leading Seaman Charles Walter King, HMS Antelope.
- Leading Seaman Laurence Edgar Styles, HMS Sandhurst.
- Leading Seaman Richard John Myers, Royal Fleet Reserve, HMS Brighton Belle.
- Leading Seaman William Edward Wells, Royal Fleet Reserve, HMS Sandhurst.
- Second Hand John Bernard Corke, HMT Slogan.
- Second Hand Phillip Robinson, HMT Kingston Olivine.
- Able Seaman Pensioner Edward Richard Anderson, HMS Paragon.
- Able Seaman Vernon Asher Bedford, HMS Barham.
- Able Seaman George Ernest Frederick Bicks.
- Able Seaman Ernest Richard Collyer, HMS Liffey.
- Able Seaman Arthur David Henry Lewis Grant, HMS Cossack.
- Able Seaman Albert Alfred Henson, HMS Scarborough.
- Able Seaman Sydney Gordon Hobbs, HMS Colne.
- Able Seaman Harold James Hubbard, HMS Whitshed.
- Able Seaman Joseph Jakeman, HMS Paragon.
- Able Seaman Daniel Harrington Rutter, HMT Ascona.
- Able Seaman Leonard Victor Wood, HMS Vanquisher.
- Signalman Andrew Hanton Brown, HMS Fowey.
- Signalman Stanley Donald Dix, HMS Sandown.
- Ordinary Signalman James Norman Memery HMS Rutlandshire.
- Telegraphist Arthur Frank Padfield, HMS Princess Elizabeth.
- Stoker 1st Class Donald Hogg, HMS Exeter.
- Stoker 1st Class Ernest George Luff, Royal Fleet Reserve, HMT Larwood.
- Cook (S) Wilfred Charles Gee, HMS Exeter.
- Engineman Peter Clark, HMT Seamist.
- Engineman Bertram Charles Fall, HMT Indian Star.
- Engineman George Ellis Harris, HMT Corenna.
- Engineman William Herbert Lofts, HMT Arctic Hunter.
- Engineman Joseph Chapman Winney, HMT Arctic Rose.
- Seaman Alfred Henry Allison, Patrol Service
- Lieutenant Commander Archibald Stuart, HMT Europa.
- Dudley Ryder, HMS Lynx.
- Seaman Donald Macleod, Patrol Service
- Lieutenant Commander Edric Ernest Swann, HMT Europa.
- Lieutenant Commander John Norman Hulse.

== Military Cross (MC) ==
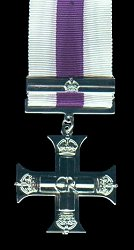
Military Cross for gallant and distinguished services in action as awarded by King George VI.

- Major John Rouse Phillips, Royal Artillery.
- Major Robert Rollo Gillespie, Royal Engineers.
- Major Archer Francis Lawrence Clive, Grenadier Guards.
- Major Jack Leslie Harry Lotinga, The Royal Fusiliers (City of London Regiment).
- Major George Crux, The Lancashire Fusiliers (Territorial Army Reserve of Officers).
- Major Gilbert McCartney Wilkins North Staffordshire Regiment (The Prince of Wales's).
- Major Alan Henry Fernyhough, Royal Army Ordnance Corps.
- Captain (temporary Major) Alexander Brassey Jonathan Scott, 5th Royal Inniskilling Dragoon Guards, Royal Armoured Corps.
- Captain (acting Major) Nigel William Metcalfe, Royal Artillery.
- Captain (acting Major) Bernard Pinney, Royal Artillery.
- Captain (acting Major) Donald Derek Cuthbertson Tulloch, Royal Artillery.
- Captain (acting Major) Edwin Sandys Dorchester Pentreath, The Duke of Cornwall's Light Infantry.
- Captain (acting Major) Edward Stephen Heygate, The Queen's Own Royal West Kent Regiment.
- Captain (acting Major) Ivor Leith Reeves, The King's Shropshire Light Infantry.
- Captain (acting Major) Clive Valentine Ferrey, Royal Army Service Corps.
- Captain (temporary Major) Thomas Henry Jefferies, Royal Army Service Corps.
- Captain (acting Major) William Melville Arnott, Royal Army Medical Corps, Territorial Army.
- Captain (acting Major) Norman Pyecroft Royal Army Medical Corps, Territorial Army.
- Captain Alec Wilfred Higgins, Royal Artillery, Territorial Army.
- Captain Frederick Edward Shrimpton, Royal Artillery, Territorial Army.
- Captain Walter Arthur George Burns, Coldstream Guards.
- Captain Richard Frank Sherlock Gooch, Coldstream Guards.
- Captain Hugh Humphrey Merriman, The Queen's Royal Regiment (West Surrey), Territorial Army.
- Captain Richard Frederick Parry, The Buffs (Royal East Kent Regiment).
- Captain Adrian Everard Hedley MBE The Royal Northumberland Fusiliers, Territorial Army.
- Captain Hetherington Long, The Royal Norfolk Regiment.
- Captain William George Dumville, The Green Howards (Alexandra, Princess of Wales's Own Yorkshire Regiment), Territorial Army.
- Captain Hugh Desmond Barre Goldie, The Royal Scots Fusiliers.
- Captain Charles Godfrey Somerville McAlester, The King's Own Scottish Borderers.
- Captain James Robert Scott-Noble, The King's Own Scottish Borderers, Territorial Army.
- Captain Benjamin du Boulay Finch White, The East Surrey Regiment.
- Captain William Augustine Waller, The Duke of Wellington's Regiment (West Riding).
- Captain Joseph Simpson Magrath, The Royal Sussex Regiment.
- Captain John Lawrence Mansel Watson, The South Lancashire Regiment (The Prince of Wales's Volunteers).
- Captain Alfred Horace Taylor, The Queen's Own Royal West Kent Regiment.
- Captain Victor Charles Warr, The Queen's Own Royal West Kent Regiment.
- Captain Edward Graham Young, The Queen's Own Royal West Kent Regiment, Territorial Army.
- Captain Roderick William Dennistoun Sword, The Middlesex Regiment (Duke of Cambridge's Own).
- Captain Desmond Marriott Finny, Royal Army Service Corps.
- Captain John Russel Heslop, Royal Army Medical Corps, Territorial Army.
- The Reverend D. B. Elliott Chaplain to the Forces, 4th Class, Royal Army Chaplain's Department, Territorial Army.
- Lieutenant (acting Major) Alan Forward, Royal Army Service Corps.
- Lieutenant (acting Major) Hamish Allan Royal Army Medical Corps.
- Lieutenant (acting Major) Charles Walter Simpson, Royal Army Medical Corps.
- Lieutenant (local Captain) John Charles Arthur Digby Lawson, 11th Hussars (Prince Albert's Own), Royal Armoured Corps.
- Lieutenant (temporary Captain) Richard Herbert Howe, Royal Tank Regiment, Royal Armoured Corps.
- Lieutenant (temporary Captain) David Boswell Egerton, Royal Artillery.
- Lieutenant (acting Captain) Harry Marshall Ford, Royal Artillery.
- Lieutenant (temporary Captain) Brian Bennett Storey, Royal Artillery.
- Lieutenant (temporary Captain) Kenneth Heathcote Osborne, Royal Engineers, Territorial Army.
- Lieutenant (acting Captain) Alfred Francis Freeman, Royal Corps of Signals.
- Lieutenant (temporary Captain) William Victor Hart, The Royal Northumberland Fusiliers.
- Lieutenant (acting Captain) Stamley James Lodger Hill, The Royal Fusiliers (City of London Regiment), Supplementary Reserve.
- Lieutenant (acting Captain) Peter Jim Ernest Rowell, The Lincolnshire Regiment.
- Lieutenant (acting Captain) Miles Cragg Pulford, The Lancashire Fusiliers.
- Lieutenant (acting Captain) Vincent McNeil Cooke, The Royal Scots Fusiliers.
- Lieutenant (acting Captain) David Harold Archer, The Queen's Own Royal West Kent Regiment.
- Lieutenant (acting Captain) Ronald Loftus Cummins, The Durham Light Infantry, Territorial Army.
- Lieutenant (temporary Captain) Mark John Lindsay, Royal Army Medical Corps, Territorial Army.
- Lieutenant Frederick Eden Allhusen, 15/18th The King's Royal Hussars, Royal Armoured Corps.
- Lieutenant Edwin Gilby, Royal Artillery.
- Lieutenant John Osmund Macdonald Alexander, Royal Engineers, Territorial Army.
- Lieutenant Arthur Harry North Dalrymple Prendergast Royal Engineers.
- Lieutenant Ernest Herbert Wilkinson, Royal Corps of Signals.
- Lieutenant Richard Crompton Roberts, Grenadier Guards.
- Lieutenant Richard John Vesey Crichton, Coldstream Guards.
- Lieutenant John Edward Hamilton Tollemache, Reserve of Officers, Coldstream Guards.
- Lieutenant John Leslie Gaussen, The Cameronians (Scottish Rifles).
- Lieutenant Keith Shaw Robertson Black, The Black Watch (Royal Highland Regiment).
- Lieutenant Grove D. Macintosh, Royal Army Medical Corps.
- Lieutenant Frederick Morley Smith, Royal Army Medical Corps.
- Second-Lieutenant (acting Captain) Ambrose Leonard Awdry, Royal Artillery, Territorial Army.
- Second-Lieutenant (acting Captain) Alan Nelson Watts, Royal Artillery, Territorial Army.
- Second-Lieutenant (acting Captain) Harold Dennis Whitehead, The Green Howards (Alexandra, Princess of Wales's Own Yorkshire Regiment), Territorial Army.
- Second-Lieutenant (acting Captain) Hubert Alaric Arthur Bray, The Dorsetshire Regiment.
- Temp. Second-Lieutenant (temporary Captain) John Edmond Noel O'Brien, General List.
- Second-Lieutenant Quentin St. John Carpendale, Royal Tank Regiment, Royal Armoured Corps.
- Temp. Second-Lieutenant Guy Allen Chambers, Royal Tank Regiment, Royal Armoured Corps.
- Temp. Second-Lieutenant Arthur Dunstan Beverly Harre, Royal Tank Regiment, Royal Armoured Corps.
- Temp. Second-Lieutenant Alec Frederick Collingwood Langly-Smith, Royal Tank Regiment, Royal Armoured Corps.
- Second-Lieutenant Jack W. Paul, Royal Tank Regiment, Royal Armoured Corps.
- Second-Lieutenant Alexander Imrie Abbott, Royal Artillery, Territorial Army.
- Second-Lieutenant David Mallory Brooke, Royal Artillery.
- Second-Lieutenant Hugh Hamilton Cruddas, Royal Artillery.
- Second-Lieutenant Hargrave John Dafforn, Royal Artillery.
- Second-Lieutenant James Alfred Greenwood, Royal Artillery, Territorial Army.
- Second-Lieutenant Geoffrey John Masters, Royal Artillery, Territorial Army.
- Second-Lieutenant Peregrine Makepeace Buchanan Matson, Royal Artillery.
- Second-Lieutenant John Lewis Pearson, Royal Artillery, Territorial Army.
- Second-Lieutenant William Maitland Speke, Royal Artillery, Territorial Army.
- Second-Lieutenant Robert Richard Patrick Spens, Royal Artillery, Territorial Army.
- Second-Lieutenant Thomas O'Grady Cochrane, Royal Engineers.
- Second-Lieutenant William Henry Pritchard, Royal Engineers, Territorial Army.
- Temp. Second-Lieutenant Stanley Reginald Welson, Royal Engineers.
- Second-Lieutenant Tom Woolfenden, Royal Engineers, Territorial Army.
- Temp. Second-Lieutenant Philip Wright, Royal Engineers.
- Second-Lieutenant Jack Anthony Piers Jones, Grenadier Guards.
- Second-Lieutenant David Urling Clark, The Queen's Royal Regiment (West Surrey), Territorial Army.
- Second-Lieutenant Arthur Johnson Symington Cox, The Queen's Royal Regiment (West Surrey), Territorial Army.
- Second-Lieutenant Eric Hillyer Ibbitson, The Queen's Royal Regiment (West Surrey), Territorial Army.
- Second-Lieutenant Geoffrey Lesslie Marett Worke, The Queen's Royal Regiment (West Surrey), Territorial Army.
- Second-Lieutenant George Wallace Anderson, The Royal Northumberland Fusiliers.
- Second-Lieutenant John James Turnbull, The Royal Norfolk Regiment.
- Second-Lieutenant Donald Robert Follett Hart, The Lincolnshire Regiment.
- Second-Lieutenant John Herbert Rogers, Reserve of Officers, The East Yorkshire Regiment (The Duke of York's Own).
- Second-Lieutenant Brian Conibear Pincombe, The Bedfordshire and Hertfordshire Regiment.
- Second-Lieutenant Douglas Robin Dalglish, The Leicestershire Regiment.
- Second-Lieutenant John Leonard Hughes, The Green Howards (Alexandra, Princess of Wales's Own Yorkshire Regiment), Territorial Army.
- Second-Lieutenant Edward Lisle Kirby, The Green Howards (Alexandra, Princess of Wales's Own Yorkshire Regiment), Territorial Army.
- Second-Lieutenant William Nelson, The Lancashire Fusiliers, Territorial Army.
- Second-Lieutenant Raymond Owen Nash, The Cheshire Regiment.
- Second-Lieutenant Walter Christopher Addison Weir, The Cameronians (Scottish Rifles).
- Second-Lieutenant Allen Robert Allison Cocksedge, The Royal Inniskilling Fusiliers.
- Second-Lieutenant Ivon Malcolm Austin, The Royal Sussex Regiment.
- Second-Lieutenant John Baptiste de Manio, The Royal Sussex Regiment, Territorial Army.
- Second-Lieutenant Edward Percy Reid Jourdain, The Royal Sussex Regiment, Territorial Army.
- Second-Lieutenant Peter Henry Rubie, The Royal Sussex Regiment.
- Second-Lieutenant Roger Cecil Redmond Roche, The Northamptonshire Regiment.
- Second-Lieutenant Francis Michael Hemsley Smith, The Queen's Own Royal West Kent Regiment, Territorial Army.
- Second-Lieutenant John Kenneth Warner, The Queen's Own Royal West Kent Regiment, Territorial Army.
- Second-Lieutenant Barrington George Widnell, The Wiltshire Regiment (Duke of Edinburgh's).
- Second-Lieutenant David William Wyatt Blackman, The Durham Light Infantry, Territorial Army.
- Second-Lieutenant Richard Hutchinson Forbes, The Durham Light Infantry, Territorial Army.
- Second-Lieutenant Reginald Arthur Westray, The Durham Light Infantry, Territorial Army.
- Second-Lieutenant Gordon Douglas Stuart Black, The Queen's Own Cameron Highlanders.
- Second-Lieutenant Patrick Bannister Garstin, The Royal Ulster Rifles.
- Second-Lieutenant Francis Brundrit Richardson, The King's Own Royal Regiment (Lancaster), Territorial Army.
- Second-Lieutenant John Kenneth Mansfield, Royal Army Service Corps, Territorial Army.
- Warrant Officer, Class I (Regimental Sergeant-Major) Horatio Donald Tocher, Royal Army Service Corps.

== Distinguished Conduct Medal ==
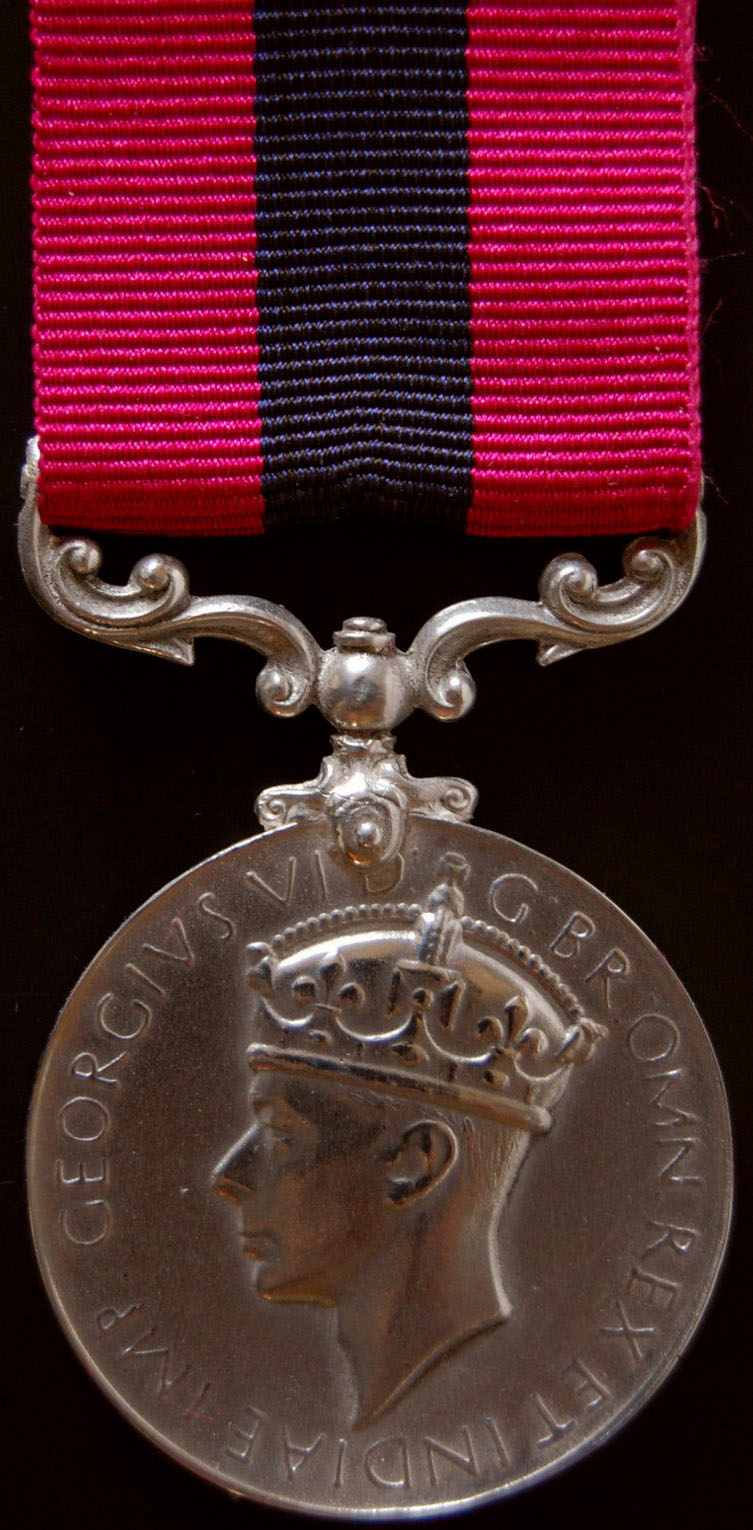
Distinguished Conduct Medal as awarded by King George VI

- Temp. Warrant Officer Class I (Regimental Sergeant-Major) Harold Light, Royal Artillery.
- Temp. Warrant Officer Class I (Regimental Sergeant-Major) J. Shelton, Royal Artillery.
- Temp. Warrant Officer, Class I (Regimental Sergeant-Major) E. A, K. Martin, Royal Artillery.
- Warrant Officer, Class I (Regimental Sergeant-Major) Percy William Philip, Royal Corps of Signals.
- Warrant Officer, Class I (Regimental Sergeant-Major) A. Hill, The Duke of Cornwall's Light Infantry.
- Warrant Officer, Class I (Regimental Sergeant-Major) A. F. Sutton, The Essex Regiment.
- Warrant Officer Class I (Regimental Sergeant-Major) William Henry Godfrey Brancombe, The Highland Light Infantry (City of Glasgow Regiment).
- Warrant Officer Class II (Battery Sergeant-Major) C. Hutchinson, Royal Artillery.
- Warrant Officer Class II (Company Sergeant-Major) Alfred Baldwin, Royal Engineers.
- Warrant Officer Class II (Regimental Quartermaster Sergeant) W. W. Page, Royal Corps of Signals.
- Warrant Officer Class II (Company Sergeant-Major) George Edward Clark, The Suffolk Regiment.
- Warrant Officer Class II (Company Sergeant-Major) L. Mahoney, The Lancashire Fusiliers.
- Warrant Officer Class II (Company Sergeant-Major) T. Jackson, The East Lancashire Regiment.
- Warrant Officer Class II (Company Sergeant-Major) William Connell, The Royal Sussex Regiment.
- Warrant Officer Class II (Company Sergeant-Major) Reginald Arthur Catchpole, The Queen's Own Royal West Kent Regiment.
- Warrant Officer Class II (Company Sergeant-Major) William Davies, The Highland Light Infantry (City of Glasgow Regiment).
- Warrant Officer Class II (Company Sergeant-Major) Sidney Ray, The Highland Light Infantry (City of Glasgow Regiment).
- Warrant Officer Class III (Platoon Sergeant-Major) Arthur James Cassford, Grenadier Guards.
- Warrant Officer Class III (Platoon Sergeant-Major) Samuel James, The Lincolnshire Regiment.
- Warrant Officer Class III (Platoon Sergeant-Major) Maurice Marriott, The East Yorkshire Regiment (The Duke of York's Own).
- Warrant Officer Class III (Platoon Sergeant-Major) L. G. Warren, The Bedfordshire and Hertfordshire Regiment.
- Warrant Officer Class III (Platoon Sergeant-Major) J. Watson, The East Surrey Regiment.
- Warrant Officer Class III (Platoon Sergeant-Major) Sidney Lewis Usher, The Border Regiment.
- Warrant Officer Class III (Platoon Sergeant-Major) Arthur Edward Chapman, The Queen's Own Royal West Kent Regiment.
- Warrant Officer Class III (Platoon Sergeant-Major) Albert Edwin Gilligan, The Queen's Own Royal West Kent Regiment.
- Warrant Officer Class III (Platoon Sergeant-Major) Arthur Frederick Slatter, The King's Shropshire Light Infantry.
- Company Quarter Master Sergeant Cecil Frederick White, Royal Corps of Signals.
- Staff Sergeant F. Prankish, Royal Army Medical Corps.
- Sergeant John Bowen, Royal Artillery.
- Sergeant John Thomas, Royal Artillery.
- Sergeant William Henry Bohlen, Royal Engineers.
- Sergeant James Septimus Huskisson, Royal Engineers.
- Sergeant Edward Joseph Powell, Royal Engineers.
- Sergeant William Dearlove, Royal Corps of Signals.
- Sergeant Gordon Arthur Stanley, Royal Corps of Signals.
- Sergeant Frank Baker, The Queen's Royal Regiment (West Surrey).
- Sergeant Reginald Wynn, The Queen's Royal Regiment (West Surrey).
- Sergeant John Francis Thompson, The Royal Northumberland Fusiliers, Territorial Army.
- Sergeant John James Bruce, The East Lancashire Regiment.
- Sergeant D. Bollands, The Royal Sussex Regiment.
- Sergeant Arthur Cyril Knapp, The Royal Sussex Regiment.
- Sergeant John Wetheringham, The Durham Light Infantry.
- Sergeant John Carruthers, The Durham Light Infantry, Territorial Army.
- Sergeant Stephen Naish, Corps of Military Police (Field Security Wing).
- Sergeant Anthony Bagot Corbett, Corps of Military Police (Field Security Wing).
- Lance-Sergeant Bertram Talbot Scott Ison, Royal Artillery.
- Corporal W. Strong, The Lancashire Fusiliers.
- Lance-Corporal Percy Meredith, Coldstream Guards.
- Trooper Edwin Glynn, 5th Royal Inniskilling Dragoon Guards.

== Military Medal (MM) ==
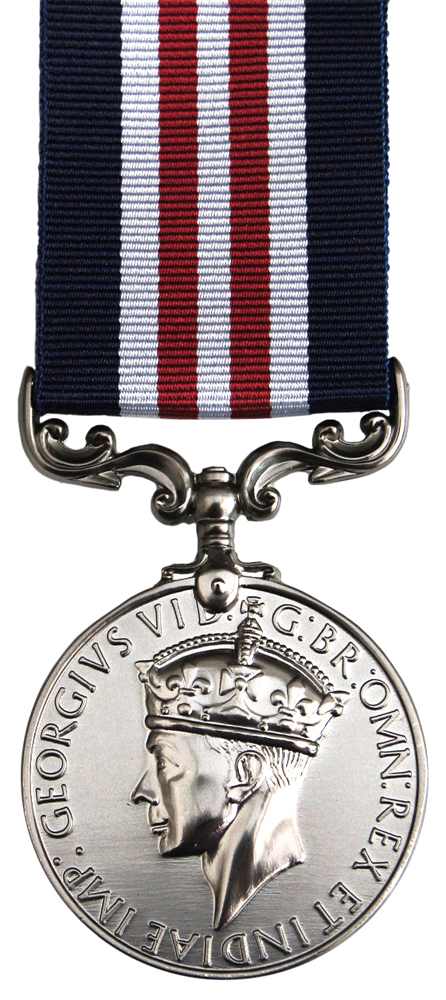
Military Medal, George VI version

- Warrant Officer Class II (Battery Sergeant-Major) William Freemantle Gittins, Royal Artillery.
- Warrant Officer Class II (Battery Sergeant-Major) Norman Sellix, Royal Artillery.
- Warrant Officer Class III (Platoon Sergeant-Major) Harry Bird, The Lincolnshire Regiment.
- Warrant Officer Class III (Platoon Sergeant-Major) James Thomson Skinner, The King's Own Scottish Borderers.
- Warrant Officer Class III (Platoon Sergeant-Major) Joseph Wilson, Royal Ulster Rifles.
- Company Quartermaster Sergeant J. W. C. Cole, Royal Engineers.
- Company Quartermaster Sergeant Martin Lawrence Friar, Royal Engineers.
- Sergeant F. E. Clarke, Royal Artillery.
- Sergeant William Arthur Hill, Royal Artillery.
- Sergeant A. Long, Royal Artillery.
- Sergeant Albert Lionel Cutler, Royal Engineers.
- Sergeant Henry Hogie, Royal Engineers.
- Sergeant Thomas William Winney, Royal Engineers.
- Sergeant Thomas Walter Goldsmith, Royal Corps of Signals.
- Sergeant George Snowden Osborn, Grenadier Guards.
- Sergeant James Noel Gordon Bennett, Coldstream Guards.
- Sergeant W. Wase, The Buffs (Royal East Kent Regiment).
- Sergeant Herbert Fenwick, The East Yorkshire Regiment (The Duke of York's. Own).
- Sergeant Robert Scott Roriston, The Queen's Own Royal West Kent Regiment.
- Sergeant Thomas Pallas, The Durham Light Infantry.
- Sergeant William Henry Baudains, Royal Ulster Rifles.
- Sergeant Norman Victor Henderson, Royal Ulster Rifles.
- Sergeant John Kiely, Royal Ulster Rifles.
- Sergeant T. Cowan, Royal Army Medical Corps.
- Sergeant Charles Henry Port, Corps of Military Police.
- Lance-Sergeant Thomas G. Corradine, Royal Engineers.
- Lance-Sergeant Robert Cecil Kelsall, Royal Engineers.
- Lance-Sergeant Arthur Joseph Pegge, Royal Engineers.
- Lance-Sergeant Douglas Maxwell Watt, Royal Engineers.
- Lance-Sergeant A. Vodden, Royal Engineers.
- Lance-Sergeant Herbert Beevers, Royal Corps of Signals.
- Lance-Sergeant J. E. Coates, The Royal Northumberland Fusiliers.
- Lance-Sergeant T. Cregan, The East Surrey Regiment.
- Lance-Sergeant Martin Jamieson, The Highland Light Infantry (City of Glasgow Regiment).
- Bombardier James Kelly Dalgleish, Royal Artillery.
- Bombardier John William Jennings, Royal Artillery.
- Corporal Stanley Goodrick Shotton, Royal Engineers.
- Corporal Andrew Alexander, Royal Corps of Signals.
- Corporal Luke Burnside, Royal Corps of Signals.
- Corporal E. Gilling, Royal Corps of Signals.
- Corporal George Lawson, Royal Corps of Signals.
- Corporal Arthur Cardwell, The Royal Northumberland Fusiliers.
- Corporal Paul Breakspear Kirby, The Royal Northumberland Fusiliers.
- Corporal Walter Hurst, The Lincolnshire Regiment.
- Corporal Jack Lindley, The Lincolnshire Regiment.
- Corporal H. Barratt, The Lancashire Fusiliers.
- Corporal Thomas Barry, The King's Own Scottish Borderers.
- Corporal Henry Reid Dick, The King's Own Scottish Borderers.
- Corporal E. Jackson, The East Surrey Regiment.
- Corporal W. Corfield, The Duke of Cornwall's Light Infantry.
- Corporal A. J. Smith, The East Lancashire Regiment.
- Corporal C. Pennington, The South Lancashire Regiment (The Prince of Wales's Volunteers).
- Corporal Arthur Frank Jarvis, The Queen's Own Royal West Kent Regiment.
- Corporal Bernard Watts, The Queen's Own Royal West Kent Regiment.
- Corporal J. Cant, The Durham Light Infantry.
- Corporal Phillip McDaid, Royal Ulster Rifles.
- Corporal Graham Christopher Jones, Royal Army Service Corps.
- Corporal V. H. Clare, Corps of Military Police.
- Lance-Bombardier Clement Flavell, Royal Artillery.
- Lance-Bombardier Stephen Louis Manson, Royal Artillery.
- Lance-Bombardier Robert Walter Whellens, Royal Artillery.
- Lance-Bombardier Wilfred Walters, Royal Artillery.
- Lance-Corporal Harold Duckworth, Royal Engineers.
- Lance-Corporal Lionel Halford, Royal Corps of Signals.
- Lance-Corporal Albert Alfred Grove, Coldstream Guards.
- Lance-Corporal Albert Edward Parish, The Buffs (Royal East Kent Regiment).
- Lance-Corporal David Thomas William Reynolds, The Buffs (Royal East Kent Regiment).
- Lance-Corporal G. Golden, The Lancashire Fusiliers.
- Lance-Corporal Thomas Hill, The Lincolnshire Regiment.
- Lance-Corporal William James Alexander, The Green Howards (Alexandra, Princess of Wales's Own Yorkshire Regiment).
- Lance-Corporal Thomas Bertram Owen, The Green Howards (Alexandra, Princess of Wales's Own Yorkshire Regiment).
- Lance-Corporal Robert Birmington, The Royal Sussex Regiment.
- Lance-Corporal George William Brooks, The Queen's Own Royal West Kent Regiment.
- Lance-Corporal Edward Culmer, The Queen's Own Royal West Kent Regiment.
- Lance-Corporal Lewis Ewart Hudson, The North Staffordshire Regiment (The Prince of Wales's).
- Lance-Corporal Leslie Marsh, The North Staffordshire Regiment (The Prince of Wales's).
- Lance-Corporal John Boustead, The Durham Light Infantry.
- Lance-Corporal Campbell Martin, Royal Ulster Rifles.
- Lance-Corporal William Alfred Stotter, Royal Army Service Corps.
- Lance-Corporal Henry James Young, Royal Army Medical Corps.
- Lance-Corporal P. Rounce, Corps of Military Police.
- Lance-Corporal H. Wilman, Corps of Military Police.
- Lance-Corporal Jasper Fitzhardinge Kingscote, Corps of Military Police (Field Security Wing).
- Sapper (acting Lance-Corporal) William Curling, Royal Engineers.
- Sapper (acting Lance-Corporal) David Thompson Gibson, Royal Engineers.
- Private (acting Lance-Corporal) Tom Henry Moore, The King's Shropshire Light Infantry.
- Driver (acting Lance-Corporal) Eric Shepherd, Royal Army Service Corps.
- Trooper George Thomas Jones, 5th Royal Inniskilling Dragoon Guards, Royal Armoured Corps.
- Trooper Harold Arthur Sims, 5th Royal Inniskilling Dragoon Guards, Royal Armoured Corps.
- Trooper Wilfred Arthur West, 5th Royal Inniskilling Dragoon Guards, Royal Armoured Corps.
- Gunner James Frederick Bolam, Royal Artillery.
- Gunner John Brown, Royal Artillery.
- Gunner Sydney Holderness, Royal Artillery.
- Gunner Reginald Knight, Royal Artillery.
- Gunner John Lancaster, Royal Artillery.
- Gunner J. McGoldrick, Royal Artillery.
- Gunner Walter Henry Messenger, Royal Artillery.
- Driver Charles George Russell, Royal Artillery.
- Gunner A. Stubbs, Royal Artillery.
- Sapper Frederick Richard Brown, Royal Engineers.
- Driver E. Boyle, Royal Engineers.
- Driver Harold Cash, Royal Engineers.
- Driver William Dobson, Royal Engineers.
- Driver J. Hopper, Royal Engineers.
- Sapper Albert Henry Humphrey, Royal Engineers.
- Driver William Kennedy, Royal Engineers.
- Sapper J. F. King, Royal Engineers.
- Sapper Francis Edwin Williams, Royal Engineers.
- Driver Dennis Noel Wright, Royal Engineers.
- Signalman Arthur Ashford, Royal Corps of Signals.
- Signalman L. A. Baker, Royal Corps of Signals.
- Signalman Eric James Bonsall, Royal Corps of Signals.
- Signalman Francis Leslie Shelmerdine, Royal Corps of Signals.
- Signalman A. Coxon, Royal Corps of Signals.
- Signalman George Edwin Dean, Royal Corps of Signals.
- Signalman Albert Richard Fish, Royal Corps of Signals.
- Signalman A. Haworth, Royal Corps of Signals.
- Signalman Thomas Frederick Hough, Royal Corps of Signals.
- Signalman Frederick Guy Hussey, Royal Corps of Signals.
- Signalman J. T. Latham, Royal Corps of Signals.
- Signalman James Cameron MacAlister, Royal Corps of Signals.
- Signalman John Henry Mullard, Royal Corps of Signals.
- Signalman T. Thompson, Royal Corps of Signals.
- Driver Leslie Henry Watkinson, Royal Corps of Signals.
- Signalman J. W. Wilson, Royal Corps of Signals.
- Guardsman James Charles George Kosbab, Grenadier Guards.
- Guardsman Laurence Cook, Coldstream Guards.
- Guardsman Joseph William Green, Coldstream Guards.
- Guardsman John Lowdon, Coldstream Guards.
- Guardsman Harry Mallory, Coldstream Guards.
- Guardsman Leonard Weather-stone, Coldstream Guards.
- Private Patrick Leonard Elton, The Queen's Royal Regiment (West Surrey).
- Private Arthur John Jones, The Queen's Royal Regiment (West Surrey), Territorial Army.
- Private W. Wilkinson, The Queen's Royal Regiment (West Surrey).
- Private J. Hart, The Buffs (Royal East Kent Regiment).
- Private A. Gallacher, The King's Own Royal Regiment (Lancaster).
- Fusilier Frederick Chrystal, The Royal Northumberland Fusiliers, Territorial Army.
- Fusilier J. F. Clarke, The Royal Northumberland Fusiliers.
- Fusilier J. R. Marley, The Royal Northumberland Fusiliers.
- Fusilier Herbert Slaughter, The Royal Northumberland Fusiliers.
- Fusilier Christopher Wilson, The Royal Northumberland Fusiliers, Territorial Army.
- Private Matthew Robert Donaldson, The Lincolnshire Regiment.
- Bandsman Alfred Stanley Filby, The Suffolk Regiment.
- Private G. Johnson, The Bedfordshire and Hertfordshire Regiment.
- Private R. Lambert, The Bedfordshire and Hertfordshire Regiment.
- Private Arthur Llewellyan Fulcher, The Green Howards (Alexandra, Princess of Wales's Own Yorkshire Regiment).
- Private J. R. Needham, The Green Howards (Alexandra, Princess of Wales's Own Yorkshire Regiment).
- Private J. A. Scuffham, The Green Howards; (Alexandra, Princess of Wales's Own Yorkshire Regiment).
- Fusilier S. Buckley, The Lancashire Fusiliers.
- Private Robert Carney, The King's Own Scottish Borderers.
- Private Joseph Johnson, The King's Own Scottish Borderers.
- Private Thomas Scott, The King's Own Scottish Borderers.
- Private J. Roberts, The East Lancashire Regiment.
- Private E. Wyeth, The East Surrey Regiment.
- Private E. Clarke, The Duke of Cornwall's Light Infantry.
- Private James Allender, The Duke of Wellington's Regiment (West Riding).
- Private William Stead, The Duke of Wellington's Regiment (West Riding).
- Private Andrew Lewis Edmondson, The Border Regiment.
- Private Harold Croft, The Royal Sussex Regiment.
- Private Wilfred George Wilson, The Royal Sussex Regiment.
- Private John Alexander Nelson, The Black Watch (Royal Highland Regiment).
- Private J. W. Sharpe, The Northamptonshire Regiment.
- Private Vincent Alfred Brooke, The Queen's Own Royal West Kent Regiment.
- Private Alan James Howard, The Queen's Own Royal West Kent Regiment.
- Private Owen George Hughes, The Queen's Own Royal West Kent Regiment.
- Private William Parsons, The Queen's Own Royal West Kent Regiment.
- Private Arthur Wollaston, The Queen's Own Royal West Kent Regiment.
- Private Wilfred Seymour Handley, The Queen's Own Royal West Kent Regiment.
- Private William John Waller, The Queen's Own Royal West Kent Regiment.
- Private John O'Connor, The King's Shropshire Light Infantry.
- Private William George Davis, The Middlesex Regiment (Duke of Cambridge's Own).
- Private G. C. Dean, The Durham Light Infantry.
- Private George Edward Iceton, The Durham Light Infantry, Territorial Army.
- Private Ralph Leslie Puddle, The Durham Light Infantry.
- Private William Carle, The Gordon Highlanders.
- Rifleman Michael Kevin Ryan, The Royal Ulster Rifles.
- Driver A. C. Ash, Royal Army Service Corps.
- Driver Victor Askew, Royal Army Service Corps.
- Driver William Henry Hall, Royal Army Service Corps.
- Driver George Arthur Headen, Royal Army Service Corps.
- Driver Benjamin Wallsworth, Royal Army Service Corps.

== Royal Red Cross (RRC) ==
First Class

- Cecilia Pyke, Matron, Queen Alexandra's Imperial Military Nursing Service, in recognition of the exceptional devotion and competency displayed by her in the performance of her nursing duties in Military Hospitals.

Second Class

- Acting Matron Margaret Ellen Garnett.
- Matron Jessie Dorothy Jackson, in recognition of exceptional devotion and competency displayed in the nursing and care of the sick in Royal Air Force hospitals at home and abroad.
- Acting Matron Mary Anne Macvicar. Senior Sister.
- Helen Fleming McFeat, Sister, Queen Alexandra's Imperial Military Nursing Service, in recognition of the special devotion and competency displayed by them in the performance of their nursing duties in Military Hospitals.
- Alice Gertrude Murrie, Sister, Queen Alexandra's Imperial Military Nursing Service.
- Jane Amelia Patterson, Sister, Queen Alexandra's Imperial Military Nursing Service.
- Rosina Emma Caroline Polus, in recognition of special devotion and competency displayed in the nursing and care of the sick in Royal Air Force hospitals at home and abroad.

== Air Force Cross ==
- Wing Commander Geoffrey Hill Ambler, Auxiliary Air Force
- Squadron Leader (now Wing Commander) Richard Llewellyn Roger Atcherley.
- Warrant Officer (now Flying Officer) Leonard Shaw Meadows Bailey.
- Squadron Leader (now Wing Commander) Lord Willoughby de Broke MC Auxiliary Air Force
- Acting Squadron Leader Thomas Wight Campbell, Reserve of Air Force Officers
- Squadron Leader John William Donaldson DSO (since reported missing).
- Squadron Leader Edward Stephen Dru Drury.
- Squadron Leader Oliver Ingham Gilson.
- Squadron Leader Albert Edward Groom MBE DSM
- Squadron Leader Ian Wilfred Campbell Mackenzie.
- Flight Lieutenant James Richard Maling.
- Squadron Leader Hugh Whittall Marlow.
- Squadron Leader Herbert Waldemar Mermagen.
- Squadron Leader James Francis Moir.
- Flying Officer Jack Ethelbert Pebody.
- Acting Flight Lieutenant (now Acting Squadron Leader) Philip Campbell Pinkham.
- Squadron Leader (now Wing Commander) Harry Alexander Purvis DFC
- Squadron Leader Henry Neville Gynes Ramsbottom-Isherwood.
- Air Commodore James Milne Robb DSO DFC
- Wing Commander Frederick William Scherger RAAF
- Flight Lieutenant Evelyn Harry Toller Thwaites.
- Squadron Leader (now Wing Commander) Brian Sheridan Thynne, Auxiliary Air Force

== Air Force Medal ==
- Flight Sergeant George Patrick Hall.
- Flight Sergeant Lester Francis Humphrey.
- Flight Sergeant George Edward Lillywhite.
- Flight Sergeant Kenneth John Plested.
- Flight Sergeant (now Warrant Officer) Hedley Picton Shippobotham.
