= Hugh Cuthbert Basset Rogers =

English historian

- Born: 1905; Wylam-on-Tyne, United Kingdom
- Died: 1978 (aged 72–73); United Kingdom
- Education: Royal Military College at Sandburst
- Occupations: Historian, author, educator, researcher

Hugh Cuthbert Basset Rogers (1905 - 1978) was an English military historian and expert on the campaigns and armies of the Napoleonic period. He wrote books on the military history of the United Kingdom.

== Early life ==
He was born in 1905 at Wylam-on-Tyne.

He was educated at Wellington College and the Royal Military College at Sandburst.

== Career ==
He was commissioned in The King's Own Royal Regiment in 1924.

He transferred to the Indian Signal Corps in 1926.

He transferred to the Royal Signals in 1930.

== Recognition ==
At the 1940 Birthday Honours of King George VI, he became an Officer of the Order of the British Empire (OBE) for military duty for the Royal Corps of Signals and its operations in France and Belgium in 1940.

== Legacy ==
He died in 1978 in the UK.

== Bibliography ==
He is the author of a number of notable books:

- A history of artillery
- Turnpike to iron road
- The British Army : today and tomorrow
- The mounted troops of the British Army, 1066-1945
- The pageant of heraldry; an explanation of its principles & its uses to-day
- The Confederates and Federals at war
