= Charles Scott Napier =

British Army officer (1899–1946)

Major-General Charles Scott Napier CB CBE
- Brigadier Napier in June 1942
- Born: 3 February 1899; India
- Died: 16 June 1946 (aged 47); London, England
- Military career
- Allegiance: United Kingdom
- Branch: British Army
- Service years: 1919–1946
- Rank: Major-General
- Nickname: Dome
- Service number: 27784
- Unit: Royal Engineers
- Conflicts: First World War; Sinai and Palestine campaign; Second World War; Battle of France; Operation Overlord; Allied advance from Paris to the Rhine; Western Allied invasion of Germany
- Awards: Companion of the Order of the Bath; Commander of the Order of the British Empire; Legion of Honour (France); Croix de Guerre (France); Commander of the Legion of Merit (United States)

Major-General Charles Scott Napier, CB, CBE (3 February 1899 – 16 June 1946) was a British Army officer who served in the First and Second World Wars. During the latter he was Chief of Movements and Transportation at the Supreme Headquarters Allied Expeditionary Force (SHAEF) during the campaign in north-west Europe.

== Early life ==
Charles Scott Napier was born in India on 3 February 1899, the oldest of the two sons of Archibald Scott Napier, a civil engineer, and his wife Katherine Edith née Liveing. He was sent to England and educated at Springfield Park School, Horsham, and Wellington College, Berkshire, where he earned a Prize Cadetship granting entry to the Royal Military Academy, Woolwich in 1915.

== First World War ==
On graduation, Napier was commissioned as a second lieutenant in the Royal Engineers on 26 May 1916, during the First World War. At the age of 17, he was too young to send overseas, so he attended a short course at the School of Mechanical Engineers, and was posted to Eastern Command. He was promoted to lieutenant on 26 November 1917, and when he reached the age of nineteen, was sent to India, from whence he joined the Egyptian Expeditionary Force in October 1918.

== Between the wars ==
After the war Napier commanded the 18th Company of the Bombay Sappers and Miners in Palestine until he was recalled to the UK in 1920 to attend a supplementary course at the University of Cambridge. He earned a First Class pass in the second-year course of the Mechanical Sciences tripos. He then attended the School of Mechanical Engineers and the railway operating course at Longmoor. On completion of the course in June 1925 he became the adjutant of Supplementary Reserve (Railway) units. He was promoted to captain on 19 January 1926. In 1927 he married Ada Kathleen Day née Douetil. They had one child, a son who was born in 1929.

In January 1928 he returned to India, as an Assistant Executive Engineer with the Eastern Bengal Railway, and later as Garrison Engineer in Murree. In 1932, Napier attended the Staff College, Camberley. He then became Garrison Engineer in Colchester. He was promoted to major on 5 March 1935, and was appointed a General Staff Officer (Grade 3) (GSO3) in the Military Intelligence Branch at the War Office on 1 September. He then became the brigade major of the 1st Anti-Aircraft Group on 26 September 1937, but returned to the War Office on 28 November 1938 as the Deputy Assistant Director of Transportation.

== Second World War ==
As the Deputy Assistant Director of Transportation, Napier planned the movement of the men and vehicles of the British Expeditionary Force to France. After the Second World War broke out, he moved to the Movements Directorate, where he oversaw the process, which involved the despatch of 160,000 personnel, 25,000 vehicles and 140,000 tonnes (140,000 long tons) of stores. It was accomplished in accordance with the plan in five weeks and without any casualties. Due to the risk of air attack, personnel were landed at Cherbourg and Le Havre, while vehicles and cargo went through ports in Brittany. He became a temporary brigadier on 8 August 1941, and was promoted to the substantive rank of lieutenant colonel on 14 November 1941, and colonel on 8 August 1943. He was granted the acting rank of major-general on 30 December 1943.

In early 1944, Napier was appointed the Chief of the Movement and Transportation Branch of the G-4 Division (the one responsible for logistics) on the Supreme Headquarters, Allied Expeditionary Force (SHAEF). In this role he coordinated the shipping and build-up of forces in Operation Overlord, the Allied invasion of France in June 1944. For his services, Napier was made an Officer of the Order of the British Empire in the 1940 Birthday Honours, and a Commander of the Order of the British Empire in the 1944 New Year Honours. On 2 August 1945, he was appointed a Companion of the Order of the Bath. His citation, written by Lieutenant-General Sir Humfrey Gale, the Chief Administrative Officer at SHAEF, read:

This officer has been the Chief of the Movement and Transportation Branch of G-4, SHAEF since early 1944 and before that time was largely responsible for coordinating, for the COSSAC staff, the planning of shipping, movement and transportation.

His highly specialised knowledge, indomitable energy, foresight and brilliant planning contributed largely to the success of the Overlord Operation.

During the progress of the operations in N.W. Europe his experience in all movement problems, his extensive knowledge of the Continental railway system, obtained by years of personal study, have enabled him to contribute in an outstanding manner to the success of the operations.

The work of coordination in transportation matters of all types has been an intricate an arduous task involving many Governments, the British, U.S. and French Armies and other agencies. Gen. Napier has been conspicuously successful in his responsible task and has earned the admiration and appreciation of all with whom he comes in contact.

He was also made a Commander of the Legion of Merit by the United States, and awarded the French Legion of Honour and Croix de Guerre. Worn out by his exertions, Napier suffered a breakdown at the end of 1944, necessitating two months' sick leave. He returned to SHAEF for the final stages of the Western Allied invasion of Germany. His attention then turned to the rehabilitation of the German transportation system.

== Post-war ==
Napier relinquished his appointment in July 1945, and retired from the Army on 11 April 1946 with the honorary rank of major-general. He accepted a position with the Allied Control Council in the hope that agreement could be reached between the former Allies on transportation matters which in turn would lead to wider cooperation, but he died suddenly in London on 16 June 1946. His remains were cremated and he is commemorated at Golders Green Crematorium. He left a widow, Ada Kathleen (nee Dovetil).

== Bibliography ==
- Smart, Nick (2005). Biographical Dictionary of British Generals of the Second World War. Barnesley: Pen & Sword. ISBN 1844150496.
