= Melville Arnott =

Scottish academic (1909–1999)

Professor Sir Melville Arnott MC TD FRCPE FRCP FRSE FRCPath

British Heart Foundation Professor of Cardiology, University of Birmingham
- In office 1971–1974

William Withering Professor of Medicine, University of Birmingham
- In office 1946–1971

Personal details
- Born: William Melville Arnott; 14 January 1909 Edinburgh, Scotland
- Died: 17 September 1999 (aged 90) Birmingham, England

Sir William Melville Arnott (14 January 1909 – 17 September 1999) was a Scottish medical doctor and academic.

Born in Edinburgh, the son of a Scottish minister, Rev Henry Arnott, he graduated from the University of Edinburgh in 1931 and was awarded his MD on renal hypertension in 1937.

He served in the Royal Army Medical Corps during the Second World War and after serving in Singapore and Tobruk, was one of the first medical officers to enter Bergen-Belsen concentration camp at the end of the war in Europe. He was awarded the Military Cross in the 1940 Birthday Honours.

He was appointed William Withering Chair in Medicine at the University of Birmingham in 1946. He played a major role on the General Medical Council and in the Nuffield Foundation's Planning Committee (1957–59) that established a new medical school at the then University of Rhodesia, now the University of Zimbabwe.

In 1937 Arnott was elected a member of the Harveian Society of Edinburgh and served as President in 1955.

Arnott delivered the 1963 Croonian Lecture at the Royal College of Physicians on The Lungs in Mitral Stenosis and was knighted in the 1971 New Year Honours.

In 1971 retired from the Chair of Medicine at Birmingham and became head of the Department of Cardiology that the British Heart Foundation had created in Birmingham, holding that post until he finally retired from academic life in 1974.

He died in Birmingham in 1999. He had married Dorothy Hill in 1938 and had one son.
