= Charles Findlay (British Army officer) =

British Army officer (1883–1965)

Brigadier Charles Findlay CBE MC
- Born: 31 October 1883
- Died: 9 June 1965 (aged 81)
- Military career
- Allegiance: United Kingdom
- Branch: British Army
- Service years: 1903–1948
- Rank: Brigadier
- Service number: 3854
- Unit: Royal Artillery
- Conflicts: First World War; Second World War
- Awards: Commander of the Order of the British Empire; Military Cross; Mentioned in Despatches; Officer of the Legion of Merit (United States)

Brigadier Charles Bannatyne Findlay, CBE, MC (1883–1965) was a senior British Army officer who served in the First World War and then the Second World War. He briefly commanded the 2nd Infantry Division.

== Military career ==
Findlay was commissioned into the Royal Artillery on 23 June 1903. He was awarded the Military Cross in the 1917 New Year Honours for his service during the First World War. He became Commander, Royal Artillery (CRA) for the 2nd Infantry Division on 17 January 1936 and served in that capacity during the Second World War.

Following the Dunkirk evacuation in May 1940, the 2nd Division was placed on Home Defence duties in Yorkshire. Findlay was appointed a Commander of the Order of the British Empire in the 1940 Birthday Honours, and briefly served as acting General Officer Commanding the 2nd Division from 12 to 15 August 1940.
