= Jasper Fitzhardinge Kingscote =

British aristocrat and military officer

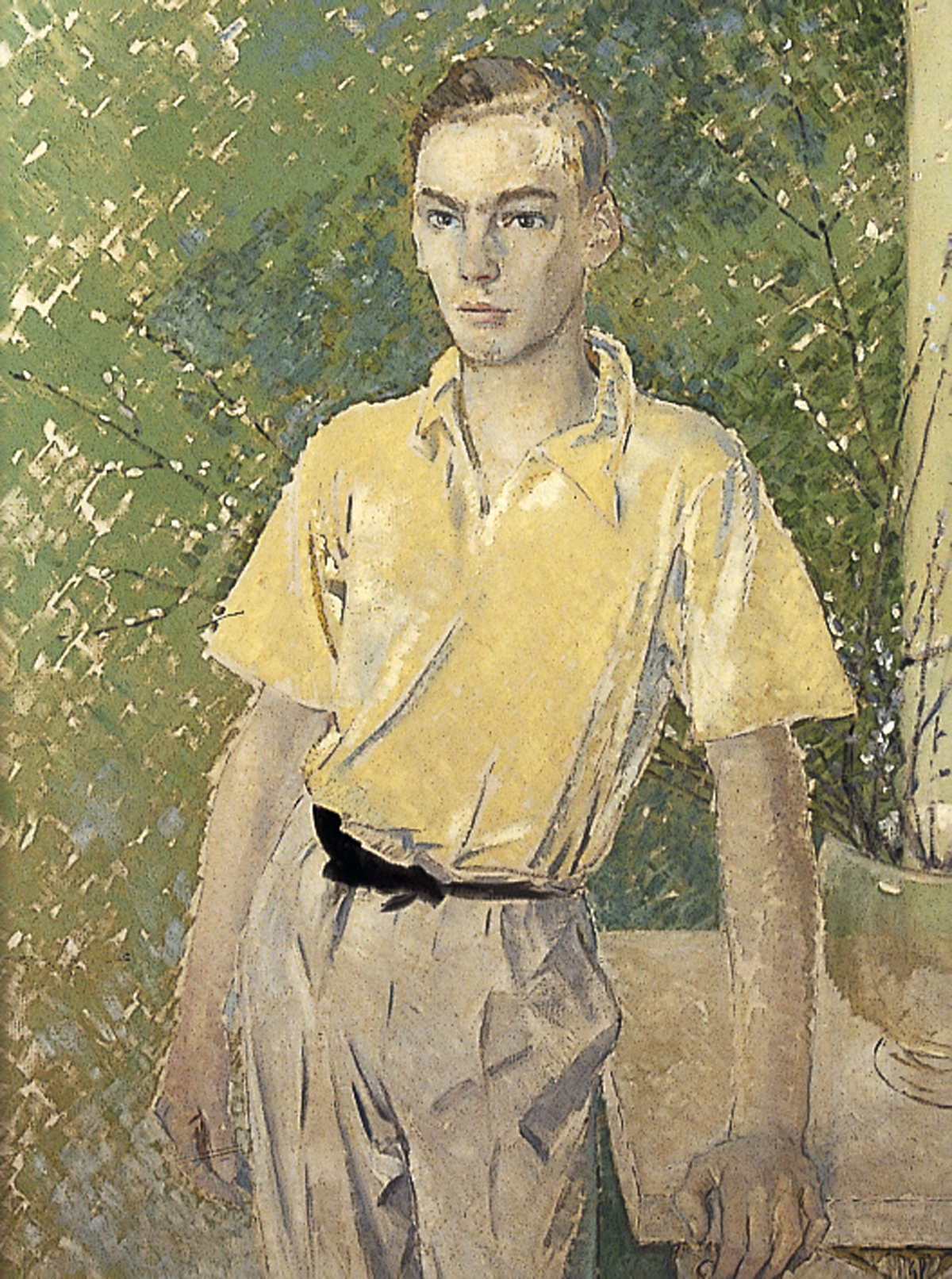
- Master Jasper Fitzhardinge Kingscote, 1933
- Born: June 17, 1917; Rochester, Kent, England
- Died: May 29, 1940 (aged 22)
- Alma mater: Trinity College, Cambridge
- Military career
- Allegiance: United Kingdom
- Branch: British Army
- Rank: Lance corporal
- Commands: Corps of Military Police
- Conflicts: Second World War

Jasper Fitzhardinge Kingscote (16 June 1917 – 29 May 1940) was a British aristocrat and military Lance corporal who served in the early stages of World War II.

Kingscote was born in Rochester, Kent, the son of the Australian Commander Robert Pringle Kingscote and Violet Anderton Greenwood from Fulham, London. His great-grandfather was Colonel Thomas Henry Kingscote, whose sons were Robert Kingscote and Thomas Kingscote.

He attended Rugby School and was admitted as a pensioner at Trinity College, Cambridge, on 1 October 1936. He obtained a Bachelor of Arts in 1939.

During World War II, Kingscote was a Lance corporal of the Corps of Military Police. He was killed in action on 29 May 1940. His name is on the Dunkirk memorial, column 147, in Dunkirk, France. He has also a war memorial inside the Trinity College Chapel, Cambridge, Ante-Chapel west wall.
