= Maundy Gregory =

British theatre producer

Arthur John Maundy Gregory, who later used the name Arthur John Peter Michael Maundy Gregory (1 July 1877 – 28 September 1941) was a British theatre producer and political fixer who is best remembered for selling honours for the Prime Minister, David Lloyd George. He may also have been involved with the Zinoviev letter, the disappearance of Victor Grayson, and the suspicious death of his platonic companion, Edith Rosse. Gregory claimed to be a spy for British intelligence.

== Early life ==
Gregory was born in Southampton, Hampshire, the son of Francis Maundy Gregory, vicar of St Michael's, Southampton, and Elizabeth Ursula, daughter of Mayow Wynell-Mayow, rector of Southam, Warwickshire, and head of a Cornwall landed gentry family.

Gregory attended Banister Court school in Southampton. A classmate was Harold Davidson, later known as the Rector of Stiffkey. He attended Oxford University as a non-collegiate student, but left in 1899, before graduation. Gregory became a teacher, and later worked as an actor and theatre producer.

Much of the information about Gregory comes from his own papers and curriculum vitae, the truth of which is questionable. According to these sources, Vernon Kell, head of MI5, recruited Gregory in 1909, possibly because of Gregory's connections from London's nightlife. At MI5, Gregory mainly compiled dossiers on suspected foreign spies living in London. Later, Sidney Reilly allegedly recruited Gregory for the recently formed MI6.

Gregory referred to his alleged time at MI5 and MI6 when he asserted that he had raised funds for the fight against Bolshevism. Official records verify that Gregory served as a private in the Irish Guards, but do not verify his time at MI5 or MI6. Gregory claimed that at about the same time he claimed he was working for MI5 and MI6, he became acquainted with Basil Thomson, the Assistant Commissioner of the Metropolitan Police's Criminal Investigation Department (CID). The relationship between Gregory and Thomson lasted for several years. In 1919 Gregory opened a newspaper The Whitehall Gazette and St James's Review to which Thomson contributed an anonymous piece.

== Selling honours ==
Around 1918, Gregory approached the Liberal Party to arrange payments to the party in exchange for peerages. He was one of many to do this. David Lloyd George hired him as a broker to gather funding for the United Constitutional Party Lloyd George was planning to form.

At the time, prices for honours ranged from £10,000 (over £400,000 in 2023) for a knighthood to £40,000 (2023 £1.6 million) for a baronetcy. Later estimates state that Gregory transferred £1–2 million (2023 £40–80 million) to the Liberal and Conservative parties. He made around £3 million a year, which he used to buy the Whitechapel Gazette newspaper and considerable real estate, including the Ambassador Club in Soho and the Deepdene Hotel, Dorking, Surrey. Reportedly, Gregory gathered gossip about the sex lives of contemporary celebrities who stayed at the two properties. The Dorking hotel gained the reputation of being "the biggest brothel in southeast England", and it was also rumoured that people at the Ambassador Club sold stolen jewellery. Allegedly, Gregory used this information for blackmail. The Whitechapel Gazette included anti-Bolshevik articles by Basil Thomson writing as "Gellius".

Gregory made many friends who were prominent members of British society, including the Duke of York, later King George VI, and the Earl of Birkenhead. He clashed, however, with the radical left-wing politician and Lenin supporter Victor Grayson, who had reportedly discovered that Gregory was selling honours, but who waited to denounce him until he had gathered further proof. Grayson also suspected Gregory of having forged Roger Casement's diaries, which were used to convict him of treason, although it later turned out that Casement had engaged in the homosexual activities described.

Some believe that Gregory was involved in Grayson's disappearance in 1920, because Grayson was stated to have been last seen entering a house that belonged to Gregory. Grayson's biographer David G. Clark suggested in his 1985 book that the statement was false, and that Grayson's disappearance was due to an unrelated scandal involving Grayson's alleged bisexuality. Clark also thought it possible that Grayson survived into the 1950s under another name.A review of a more recent biography (Bates 2025) states that it is unclear whether Grayson disappeared as a result of a possible murder or whether he "simply performed a vanishing trick to escape his creditors".

There are also claims that Gregory was involved in the Zinoviev letter affair that influenced the defeat of the Labour Party in the 1924 General Election.

In 1927, the ensuing Conservative government blocked Gregory's honours-selling scheme. He began selling non-British honours, such as noble titles from Serbia and Ukraine, and papal honours and dispensations, such as the knighthood of the Order of the Holy Sepulchre. Among his victims was the Catholic father of actress Mia Farrow, to whom he had promised a marriage annulment. Gregory himself was made a Knight Grand Cross of the Holy Sepulchre and in 1930 a Commander of the Venerable Order of St John.

According to published MI5 files, when Russian diplomat Ivan Korostovets tried to recruit Gregory to work against the Bolsheviks, Gregory used the Anglo-Ukrainian Fellowship as a front to continue his peerage sales and kept all the money for himself.

Gregory also continued to accept money for British peerages from people unaware that he could no longer provide them. Those who paid him had no legal recourse; they could neither report him to the authorities nor sue in civil court without themselves being prosecuted under the Honours (Prevention of Abuses) Act 1925. In 1930, Gregory was sued for £30,000 by the estate of a baronet who had died before receiving a peerage purchased from him, and had to return the money.

== Edith Rosse ==
Gregory had been friends with actress Edith Marion Rosse for many years. He leased a house called Vanity Fair located on Thames Ditton Island to Rosse and her husband in 1920, and moved in with them the following year. After Rosse separated from her husband in 1923, she and Gregory continued to live under the same roof in a platonic relationship (Gregory was a homosexual). The couple later moved to Abbey Lodge in St John's Wood (the house was later converted into the recording studios).

In 1932, she turned down his request for a loan, but was persuaded to change her will only a few days before her death. He inherited £18,000. Some suspect Rosse did not die of natural causes, but rather was poisoned by Gregory. After Gregory's fall in the "Honours" Scandal trial, Scotland Yard exhumed Rosse's body to look for postmortem evidence of poison. However, Gregory had seen to it that Rosse's grave was located in very wet ground and was unusually shallow with an unsealed coffin lid.

It was later alleged that Gregory had delayed Rosse's burial until he found a location that frequently flooded because he believed that this would prevent later recovery of evidence. Pathologist Sir Bernard Spilsbury suspected as much, but was unable to find any useful evidence or trace of poison. Rosse remains buried in All Saints' graveyard by the side of the River Thames at Bisham, Berkshire.

== Later life ==
In 1932, Gregory tried to sell Lieutenant Commander E. W. Billyard Leake a peerage for £12,000. Leake pretended to be interested, but informed the police and Gregory was arrested. Gregory could now threaten to name in court those who had bought peerages. Because he pleaded guilty (possibly persuaded to do so by embarrassed buyers), Gregory did not have to give evidence in court. He did, however, give interviews to the press trying to prove his innocence.

In 1933, Gregory was convicted under the Honours (Prevention of Abuses) Act 1925 of selling honours. He was fined £50 and jailed for two months. As of 2023, he remains the only person to have been convicted under this act. The names of those who bought their peerages are still unknown. His case file was moved to the National Archives in 2002.

Gregory declared bankruptcy in 1933. After he was released, he moved to Paris where he lived under an assumed name made up of the third and fourth given names ('Peter' and 'Michael') he had adopted, on a £2,000 annual pension from sources close to the Conservative Party. British historian Andrew Cook claims that Gregory took his records with him.

Gregory took an interest in the life of the author Frederick Rolfe (also known as Baron Corvo), and supported the author A. J. A. Symons in obtaining materials for his celebrated biography of Rolfe, The Quest for Corvo (published 1934). Gregory was able to use his connections to retrieve two lost works by Rolfe, the novel Don Renato, and Rolfe's translation of the poetry of Meleager. Symons gives a bemused description in his Quest of Gregory's affluence and cultivated air of mystery, but notes blandly that "Since [Gregory] left England to live abroad eight months ago, my enquiries [to him] have remained unanswered."

After the German occupation of France during the Second World War in 1940, he was captured and sent to a labour camp. Sources reporting Gregory's death are conflicting. He reportedly died on 28 September 1941, either at an internment camp or at the Hospital de Val-de-Grâce in Paris. Unlike most civilian Britons who died in enemy captivity, he is not listed among civilian deaths in France by the Commonwealth War Graves Commission.

== References in popular fiction ==
In the 1993 novel Closed Circle by Robert Goddard, the main character, Guy Horton, meets Gregory, who employs him to encourage wealthy businessmen to use his services to obtain peerages.

== See also ==
- Cash for Honours

== Sources ==
- Richard Aldington - Frauds (London: William Heinemann Ltd, 1957), pp 158-184.
- Douglas Brown and E. V. Tullett – The Scalpel of Scotland Yard: the Life of Sir Bernard Spilsbury (New York: E.P. Dutton and Co.Inc., 1952)
- Andrew Cook – Hawking Peerages (History Today November 2006)
- Tom Cullen – Maundy Gregory: Purveyor of Honours (1974) ISBN 0-370-01373-5
- Gerald Macmillan – Honours for Sale: The Strange Case of Maundy Gregory (London: The Richards Press, 1954)
- A. J. A. Symons; int. Sir Norman Birkett and Sir Shane Leslie (1992). The Quest for Corvo: An Experiment in Biography. London: Folio Society.
- John Walker – The Queen Has Been Pleased: The British Honours System at Work (1986) ISBN 0-436-56111-5
