= Maundy =

Maundy may refer to:

- Maundy Thursday, a Christian holiday commemorating the Last Supper
- Maundy (foot washing), the liturgical foot washing ceremonies which occurs on Maundy Thursday
- Maundy money, dispensed at the Maundy ceremony by the British Monarch

== See also ==
- Maundy Gregory
