= Gustav Steinhauer =

- Born: c. 1870; Berlin
- Died: 1930
- Occupations: Spymaster, Sailor
- Espionage activity
- Allegiance: Imperial Germany
- Service branch: Nachrichten-Abteilung

Gustav Steinhauer was born in Berlin c. 1870. He was an officer of the Imperial German Navy who in 1901 became head of the British section of the German Admiralty's intelligence service, the Nachrichten-Abteilung, ('N'). He had trained at the Pinkerton Detective Agency in Chicago and spoke fluent English with an American accent.

Steinhauer had been part of Kaiser Wilhelm II's bodyguard at the funeral of Queen Victoria in 1901. During the visit Steinhauer foiled an assassination plot by a group of Russian anarchists on the Kaiser's life, working alongside British detective and spymaster William Melville.

Steinhauer was responsible for the creation of a network of German spies in Britain in the period before the war. Steinhauer had mostly recruited his agents through writing to German businessmen resident in the UK inviting them to work for him. MI5 soon clocked onto this activity and began intercepting the correspondence between Steinhauer and his agents, between 1911 and 1914 MI5 intercepted 1,189 letters relating to such German espionage.

In late July, the week before the declaration of the First World War, Steinhauer toured Britain under the alias 'Fritsches' to make contact with elements of his agent network, although MI5 knew he was present in the country they did not have the resources to mount sufficient surveillance to apprehend him. Vernon Kell, head of MI5, claimed to have ordered the arrest of 22 of Steinhauer's agent ring at the outset of war, leaving no significant German spies in Great Britain; but modern research has exploded this claim, which appears to have been made to promote the hasty passage of the Aliens Restriction Act of August 1914.

Steinhauer later recalled the Kaiser's fury at the seeming obliteration of German surveillance of the British Navy screaming 'Am I surrounded by dolts? Who is responsible? Why was I not told!?'

== Trivia ==
Historian Andrew Cook has suggested that Steinhauer's plot to blow up the Bank of England could have been Ian Fleming's inspiration for the character and plot of Auric Goldfinger.
