= Toivo Vähä =

Finnish–Soviet intelligence officer

- Born: 12 April 1901; Iitti, Grand Duchy of Finland
- Died: 18 June 1984 (aged 83) Petrozavodsk, Soviet Union
- Allegiance: Red Finland; Soviet Union
- Service years: 1918–1964
- Rank: Colonel
- Conflicts: Finnish Civil War; Russian Civil War; Sino-Soviet conflict World War II
- Awards: Order of Lenin

Toivo Juhonpoika Vähä (Russian: То́йво Ю́хонпойка Вя́хя, also known as Ivan Mikhailovich Petrov, Russian: Ива́н Миха́йлович Петро́в, 12 April 1901 – 18 June 1984) was a Finnish-born Soviet colonel of the KGB. He fled to Soviet Russia after the 1918 Finnish Civil War and made a long career in the Red Army and the Soviet Border Troops. Vähä was one of the few Finnish exile revolutionaries who survived the Great Purge. He is best known for his role in the 1925 capture of the British super-spy Sidney Reilly during the Operation Trust.

== Early life ==
Toivo Vähä was born to the family of Juho Vähä, an industrial worker, and Maria Lindström. He started working at the age of 14, having several jobs in Helsinki. In 1916, Vähä moved to the industrial community of Dubrovka, near the Russian capital Saint Petersburg. At the time, Finland was an autonomous part of the Russian Empire. Vähä had five brothers, who all followed him to Russia after the 1917 February Revolution. Their father had emigrated to Russia few years earlier.

As the Finnish Civil War broke out in January 1918, Vähä joined the Saint Petersburg Finnish Red Guard, a paramilitary unit composed of Finnish emigrant workers in Saint Petersburg. The battalion was sent to Finland, where Vähä fought in the Battle of Kämärä, and later served as a courier in the Battle of Vilppula. As the Red front collapsed in the Northern Tavastia region, the Saint Petersburg Reds retreated to eastern Finland. After the decisive loss of the Battle of Vyborg in late April, many fled to Soviet Russia.

Like hundreds of other Finnish exile Red Guard fighters, Vähä joined the Red Army and fought with the Bolsheviks in the Russian Civil War. In the summer of 1919 Vähä served in Siberia, and was then sent back to Petrograd to join the military academy. In 1920–1923, Vähä took a three-year course at the international Petrograd Red Officer School, where he was joined by four of his brothers. During his time in the academy, Vähä took part in the arrests of the suspects of the Kuusinen Club Incident in September 1920, the suppression of the Kronstadt rebellion in March 1921, and the suppression of the East Karelian uprising in the winter of 1922. After the Battle of Kimasozero in January 1922, Vähä killed three captured Finnish White Guard soldiers on the orders of his platoon leader Toivo Antikainen. Antikainen was later captured in Finland, where he received a life sentence for the murders.

After his graduation in March 1923, Vähä was recruited by the NKVD. He served as a border station commander at the Finnish border in the Karelian Isthmus. From 1924 Vähä worked for the GPU in Leningrad, until he was moved to a border station in Sestroretsk in June 1925.

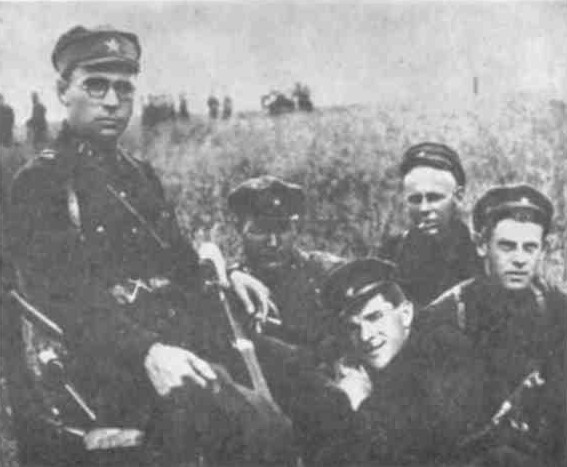
Soviet border troops in Transbaikalia. Toivo Vähä in the middle.

== Operation Trust ==
In 1924, the Soviet secret police Cheka recruited Vähä to Operation Trust. It was launched in 1921 to set up a fake resistance organization, to identify anti-Bolsheviks. Vähä played the role of a Soviet traitor who helped the counter-revolutionaries, Russian emigrants and western agents to sneak from Finland to the Soviet Union. He was recruited by Finnish Army Intelligence, who mistook Vähä for an ordinary Soviet border guard. In reality he was working under the command of the Polish revolutionary Stanisław Messing, the head of the Leningrad Cheka. Finnish intelligence trusted Vähä, and even recommended him to the British Secret Intelligence Service.

In September 1925 the Cheka managed to lure the British agent Sidney Reilly into crossing the border. Vähä smuggled him across the Sestra River and took Reilly to the Pargolovo railway station, where he was arrested. The Finns had successfully tested the route just a few days earlier, when Vähä escorted the courier of the White general Alexander Kutepov to the Soviet side. Reilly was taken to Moscow for interrogation and shot in November 1925. To complete the operation, the Cheka staged Vähä's death to mislead the British. He was held at the Hotel Evropeiskaya in Leningrad, and then secretly shipped to Moscow. Cheka put out a rumour that Vähä was shot as a traitor. In Moscow he was given a new identity as Ivan Petrov. In 1925–28, Vähä studied in the Border Academy, but was sent to the Far East after an old acquaintance recognized him. Vähä then served on the Chinese border in the Argun River area, and fought in the 1929 Sino-Soviet conflict.

== The Great Purge and the World War II ==
Between 1934 and 1937, Vähä served in the Black Sea and the Belorussian Border Guards. He had kept his real identity secret, but as Stalin launched the campaign against ″nationalists″, Vähä's Finnish accent attracted attention. Unfortunately he had close relations with the Army Commander Ieronim Uborevich, who was executed during the Case of Trotskyist Anti-Soviet Military Organization. Vähä was arrested in February 1938, then declared an ″enemy of the people″ and given the death penalty. For some reason, he was not executed immediately, but kept on a death row for more than a year.

In November 1939 Vähä was given a chance to join the army of the Finnish Democratic Republic, a puppet government created during the 1939–1940 Winter War. After the war, he was named as commander of the Red Army Infantry Regiment 126, which was composed of Karelians, Ingrians and Finns. Instead of Ivan Petrov, Vähä was using his real name again. As Nazi Germany launched its campaign against the Soviet Union in June 1941 he was replaced by another Finnish-born officer, Valter Valli. Vähä became the commander of Infantry Regiment 143, and shortly after of Infantry Regiment 936 of the 3rd Belorussian Front. In September 1941, Vähä was wounded near the town of Staraya Russa. After his recovery, he was sent to Ural, where he served as the head of the Zlatoust Infantry Academy until January 1946.

== Last years ==
Vähä served his last years as a KGB colonel in Kaliningrad. After 1964 Vähä lived in Zhytomyr Oblast in Ukraine and managed various state enterprises. He retired in 1967, and moved to Petrozavodsk in the Karelian ASSR. Vähä wrote an autobiography which was released in 1970 and translated into Finnish in 1974. He also wrote three other memoirs, including one on Operation Trust, and several short stories that were published in the Finnish-language Karelian literature magazine Punalippu.

Operation Trust was brought to public attention in 1964. Newspaper stories mentioned Vähä's name, calling him a Soviet hero. Vähä's family finally learnt about his former life. When Vähä went underground in 1925, he had abandoned his wife and daughter. Vähä later married again and had another daughter, who was named Lilya, as was his first child. During his last years Vähä publicly criticised Stalinism. He also paid attention to the mistakes of the Soviet Communist Party, which he had joined in 1920.

== Death ==
Toivo Vähä died in Petrozavodsk in 1984 at the age of 83. The bust on his grave was erected by the KGB. In 2001, a big party was organized in Petrozavodsk when it was one 100-years since the birth of Vähä, where the speakers were, among others, the current Secretary of the Russian Security Council Nikolai Patrushev, who in the early stages of his career led the Karelian Security Service and later the Russian Security Service FSB. In 1990, Soviet author Oleg Tikhonov published a documentary novel of Vähä's life.
