= George Hill (intelligence officer) =

British intelligence officer (1892–1968)

George Alexander Hill DSO MBE MC (1892–1968) was a noted British intelligence officer of the First and Second World Wars.

== Biography ==
=== Youth ===
Hill, born 10 August 1893 in Karsyan, Holy Russian Empire, (now Russia) was the son of a timber merchant with business interests stretching from Siberia to Persia. He was born in Estonia and educated by French and German governesses. He had exceptional linguistic skills, and learned to speak six languages, including Russian.

=== First World War ===
Hill was in British Columbia on a fishing trip when the First World War broke out in 1914. He joined a Canadian infantry regiment and was posted to Ypres in 1915. He displayed exceptional bravery and was seriously wounded. He was then sent to the War Office where after training by Scotland Yard he began his career as an intelligence officer, his first assignment being to fly agents behind enemy lines in Greece.

In 1917, he was sent to Petrograd, ostensibly as a member of the Royal Flying Corps mission, arriving amid the confusion of the Bolshevik Revolution. In his memoirs, not generally regarded as entirely reliable, he described how he took the Romanian crown jewels from the Kremlin to Iași, helped Leon Trotsky to organise a military intelligence service and the Red Air Force, ran guns to Ukrainian nationalists, and recruited German agents for counter-intelligence work. According to Hill he personally blew up an enemy gasworks, overpowered an assassin who attempted to kill him with a grenade by striking him in the head with a brick and ran one of 2 men who had followed him from secret meeting through with his swordstick. He eschewed carrying firearms whilst undercover as he considered them impossible to explain if searched and improvised having a bottle of acid to hand whenever writing his dispatches so that he could quickly destroy his secret documents if necessary. Rather than physical force Hill preferred bribery noting that 'I had always found the value of including in my kit a certain amount of good plain chocolate, half a dozen pairs of ladies silk stockings and two or three boxes of the more expensive kind of Parisian toilet soap. My experience was that, presented at the right psychological moment they would unlock doors which neither wine nor gold would open' When the British landed in Murmansk he was obliged to flee to Finland with the Soviet secret service, the Cheka in hot pursuit. He returned briefly to Russia before being posted by the Secret Intelligence Service (SIS) to the Middle East. SIS being short of funds, he left after three years and lived in a caravan in Sussex with his wife. His service had earned him a DSO and an MBE, and he was mentioned in dispatches three times.

Hill was awarded the Military Cross (MC) as announced in The London Gazette on 11/12 February 1919: "His Majesty the KING has been graciously pleased to approve the undermentioned rewards for distinguished services rendered in connection with Military operations in the Field:—Awarded the Military Cross. Lieutenant. George Alexander Hill, 4th Bn; Manch. R."

Hill took a series of jobs, with Royal Dutch Shell, he was manager of the Globe Theatre in London, and deputy general manager to the theatrical impresario C. B. Cochran. He also wrote two volumes of memoirs, Go Spy the Land (1933) and The Dreaded Hour (1936) as well as two unpublished plays.

=== Second World War ===
At the outbreak of the Second World War, Hill was recalled to SIS with the rank of major. He worked as a trainer in section D (destruction), his students including Kim Philby who wrote later that he was impressed by 'Jolly George' Hill's knowledge of explosives Hill stayed at the training school when it was taken over by the Special Operations Executive (SOE).

In 1941, Hill, now a colonel, was chosen to lead a SOE mission to Russia, codenamed Sam. That September, he arrived in Moscow in time for the signing of two agreements between SOE and the Soviet security organisation, NKVD. These were designed to co-ordinate propaganda and sabotage in occupied Europe, to avoid acting in each other's spheres of influence, to help each other infiltrate agents into occupied territory, and to decide on targets and priorities. These agreements did not lead to much genuine activity, though Hill did manage to help infiltrate some Soviet agents into occupied Europe, in an operation codenamed Pickaxe. There were more Pickaxe operations in 1942, though the Foreign Office began to worry that about Britain's allies finding they had dropped Soviet agents into their countries. In addition, SOE was not happy with the quality of some of the agents who were to be transported and regarded a number of them as being completely unsuitable. In the event, there were only four successful missions in 1942 and a further six in 1943. Whitehall became impatient with Sam. Anthony Eden, the British foreign secretary, complained that Hill was wasting the taxpayers' money. Hill replied that the problems resulted from 'sand in axle box tactics' in London; he was supported by the ambassador to Moscow, Sir Archibald Clark Kerr.

In April 1944, Hill's opposite number, Colonel Chichayev, complained that SOE had done practically nothing and that the Soviets no longer had any need for them. At the same time, SOE was frustrated by NKVD's refusal to co-operate in Soviet-occupied Europe, particularly with the Polish underground army. Hill could not really be blamed: it was unrealistic to expect SOE and NKVD to co-operate successfully.

Clark Kerr arrived in London in December 1944 and announced that there was little for Hill to do in Moscow. He now held the rank of brigadier and it was felt that he could be replaced by a more junior officer. Hill returned to London in the summer of 1945.

=== Post-war ===
After the war, Hill became a director of the British-owned German mineral water company Apollinarius. He died in 1968, shortly after his second marriage.

== Works ==
- G. Hill, Go Spy the Land (1933)
- G. Hill, The Dreaded Hour (1936)

== Dramatic representations ==
Hill was featured in six episodes of the popular 1983 television series Reilly, Ace of Spies which related the story of his colleague Sidney Reilly. He was portrayed by actor Hugh Fraser.

== Sources ==
- G. Hill, Go Spy the Land (1933) and The Dreaded Hour (1936)
- Giles Milton Russian Roulette: How British Spies Thwarted Lenin's Global Plot, Sceptre, 2013. ISBN 978 1 444 73702 8
- Service, Robert. (2011). Spies & Commissars: Bolshevik Russia And The West. MacMillan. London. ISBN 978-1-4472-0200-4
