= DeWitt Clinton Poole =

American spymaster in Revolutionary Russia

DeWitt Clinton Poole (October 28, 1885 – September 3, 1952) was an American intelligence officer. He served as U.S. Consul General in Moscow, and acted as America's spymaster in Revolutionary Russia.

Born in Vancouver, Washington, he graduated from the University of Wisconsin-Madison in 1906 and from the George Washington University Diplomatic School in 1910. Subsequently, he joined the United States Foreign Service, with assignments in Berlin, Paris, Moscow, and Archangelsk.

== 1918 Ambassadors plot to assassinate Lenin ==
Poole arrived in Moscow in September 1917, two months before the Bolshevik Revolution, and left via Saint Petersburg in late 1918 for the port of Arkhangelsk. He was "active in implementing U.S. policy, negotiating with the Bolshevik authorities, and supervising American intelligence operations that gathered information about conditions throughout Russia, especially monitoring anti-Bolshevik elements and areas of German influence."

Historian Barnes Carr implicated Poole in the Ambassadors Plot to assassinate Vladimir Lenin in 1918, which the press termed the Lockhart—Reilly plot, after two of its principal agents. Poole employed Xenophon Kalamatiano as his main field officer. Besides Sidney Reilly, the main Russian plotter was Boris Savinkov, who ran an anti-tsarist and anti-communist underground. The group was eventually uncovered by the cheka, and the bolsheviks responded by escalating the red terror.

U.S. Secretary of state Robert Lansing allegedly initiated the plot after Lenin seized power in October 1917 and removed Russia from World War I, as part of a secret deal the Bolsheviks had struck with Germany. President Woodrow Wilson's foreign policy was publicly opposed to interference, but he told Lansing the Moscow coup had his "entire approval".

In addition to instigating an attempted coup d'etat, they laundered money through the British and French to send the American Expeditionary Force (AEF) on the Polar Bear Expedition under British Command by General Edmund Ironside in Operation Archangel, part of the North Russia intervention, an Allied intervention in the Russian Civil War. General Jean Lavergne, chief of the French military mission to Russia was aided by Consul General fr:Joseph-Fernand Grenard, who attempted to recruit resistance armies to march on Bolshevik Moscow, and dispatched agents across Russia.

After the invasion failed, inquires were met with "evasive avoidance" in America. President Franklin Roosevelt in 1933 indirectly denied the matter in claiming a "happy tradition of friendship for more than a century". President Ronald Reagan again denied it in the 80's in a public address to the Russian people, stating "our governments have had serious differences, but our sons and daughters have never fought each other in a war."

== Academic activities at Princeton ==
Poole helped found the Princeton School of Public and International Affairs, serving as director (1933–1939). On February 23, 1930, the front page of The Sunday New York Times announced:

Princeton Founds Statesmen's School – Institution Will Train Youths for Public Life and Will Stress Internationalism – Hoover Hails The Project. De W.C. Poole Quits Diplomatic Service to Be Its Liaison Officer With World Affairs. The establishment of a school of public and international affairs at Princeton University was announced today by President John Grier Hibben in his annual message to the National Alumni Association. The school's primary purpose is to train young men for public life and to equip them—and others—with a broad sense of "the fundamentals of citizenship."

Once WWII was under way, Poole left Princeton to become director of the Foreign Nationalities Branch, Office of Strategic Services, from 1941 to 1945.

== See also ==
- Princeton School of Public and International Affairs § Founding
- National Committee for a Free Europe § History
- Tracy Philipps § Nationalities Branch

== Works ==
- The Conduct of Foreign Relations under Modern Democratic Conditions (1924)

== Bibliography ==
- Carr, Barnes (2020). The Lenin Plot: The Unknown Story of America's War Against Russia. Pegasus Books. ISBN 978-1-64313-317-1.
- "DeWitt Poole Dies; Retired Diplomat". The New York Times. September 4, 1952. p. 27.
- Lees, Lorraine M.; Rodner, William S., eds. (2014). An American Diplomat in Bolshevik Russia: DeWitt Clinton Poole. History Faculty Bookshelf. Vol. 17. University of Wisconsin Press. ISBN 9780299302245.
- Rothe, Anna, ed. (1950). Current Biography: Who's News and Why, 1950. H. W. Wilson Company.
