= Andrew Cook (author) =

British author, popular historian

Dr Andrew J. Cook
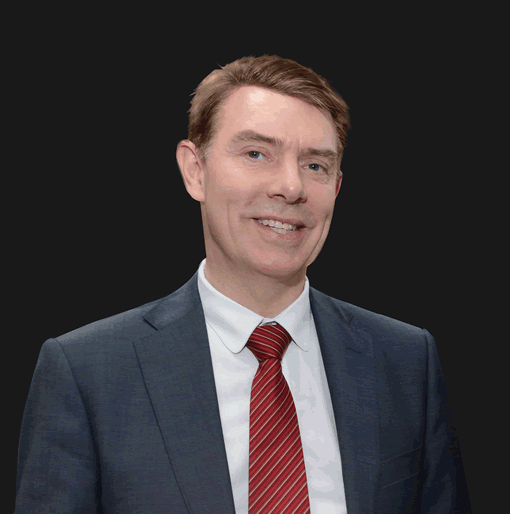
- Cook in 2021
- Education: University of London, University of Wales, Icknield High School
- Writing career
- Genre: Espionage history
- Notable works: On His Majesty's Secret Service: Sidney Reilly Codename ST; M: MI5's First Spymaster

Dr Andrew J. Cook is a British author, popular historian, television presenter/consultant, and former British civil servant. He specialises in early 20th century espionage history. He has produced well-received biographies of Sidney Reilly and William Melville. He was also the CEO of King's House Moorlands School Group from 2021 to 2026, being the Headmaster of the school from 1992 to 2021.

== Biography ==
Dr Andrew John Cook was born in December 1959 in Luton, Bedfordshire. Not much is known about his early life, although he attended Icknield High School during his adolescence. Cook holds a university degree in history and ancient history and was for a time program director of the Hansard Scholars Program, University of London. He worked for many years as a foreign affairs and defence specialist with the United Kingdom government. He was an aide to George Robertson (former Secretary of State for Defence, later Secretary–General of NATO) and John Spellar (former Minister of State for the Armed Forces). The contacts he made in government later enabled him, as an author, to navigate and gain access, via the Cabinet Office, to classified intelligence services archives. He also has a PhD in History and attended the University of Wales. In 2002, he was Headmaster of one of the UK's top preparatory schools in Bedfordshire, which he closed to establish another by the name of King's House Preparatory School in 2012. He also established Moorlands Grammar School, a secondary school, in 2021. On 26 February 2026, Cook closed down King's House Moorlands School with 30 minutes notice, leaving staff redundant and students with no school to attend. This was documented on the BBC News website, BBC Three Counties Radio and BBC Look East on 27 February, along with being broadcast on ITV News Anglia on 28 February.

Cook spent the years 1994 to 2004 researching the life of Sidney Reilly, the notorious spy. He interviewed the descendants of people who featured in Reilly's story and scrutinized over 2,000 closed or unpublished documents in 14 different countries. He was only the fifth historian to be given special permission under the 1992 “Waldegrave Initiative” by the Cabinet Office to examine closed MI5 documents that will never be released.

He was the presenter and historical consultant for Channel 4 documentaries about Prince Albert Victor (based upon his book on "Prince Eddy"), Three Kings at War and Who Killed Rasputin? – all in the BBC Timewatch strand. He was historical consultant for the Channel Five Jack The Ripper - Tabloid Myth documentary (2009; in the popular Revealed strand).

Cook has written articles on espionage history for The Times, The Guardian, The Independent, BBC History Magazine, and History Today. He lives in Barton-le-Clay, Bedfordshire.

On 22nd June 2026 he informed his staff, via a letter, at Tots Academy nursery, it would be closing on 23rd June 2026 once again due to Insolvency. Parents were emailed the same day advising of the closure, again leaving children with no education. Nursery children, reception and year one children all affected.

Dr Cook's home in Biddenham (not Barton), is for sale.

== Works ==
- Cook, Andrew (2002), On His Majesty's Secret Service: Sidney Reilly Codename ST1; Tempus Pub Ltd; 287 pages.
  - Reprinted/revised as: Ace of Spies: The True Story Of Sidney Reilly (2004), The History Press; Paperback “2nd edition”.
  - Reprinted as: Ace of Spies: The True Story Of Sidney Reilly, Inspiration for James Bond (2004), The History Press (Series: Revealing History); Paperback “3rd edition”.
- Cook, Andrew (2004), M: MI5’s First Spymaster; Tempus Pub Ltd; 336 pages
- Cook, Andrew (2005), To Kill Rasputin: The Life and Death of Grigori Rasputin; Tempus Pub Ltd; 336 pages.
- Cook, Andrew (2006), Prince Eddy: The King Britain Never Had; Tempus Pub Ltd; (Series: Revealing History); 288 pages.
- Cook, Andrew (2007), To Be An Airline Pilot; Airlife Publishing.
- Cook, Andrew (2008), Cash for Honours: the True Life of Maundy Gregory; Sutton; 256 pages.
- Cook, Andrew (2009), Jack the Ripper; Amberley Publishing; 296 pages.
- Cook, Andrew (2010), The Murder of the Romanovs; Amberley Publishing, 320 pages
- Cook, Andrew (2013), Great Train Robbery: The Untold Story from the Closed Investigation Files; The History Press, 288 pages.
- Cook, Andrew (2013), 1963: That Was the Year That Was; The History Press 192 pages.
- Cook, Andrew (2015), Ian Fleming Miscellany; The History Press 192 pages.
- Cook, Andrew (2022), The Crimes of the Gestapo: From the Closed Files of MI14; Amberley Publishing.
- Cook, Andrew (Projected: 2025), The Real Goldfinger: German Spymaster Gustav Steinhauer and the Bank of England Plot; The History Press.
