= Ho Liang Shung =

Chinese engineer and spy (1879–1952)

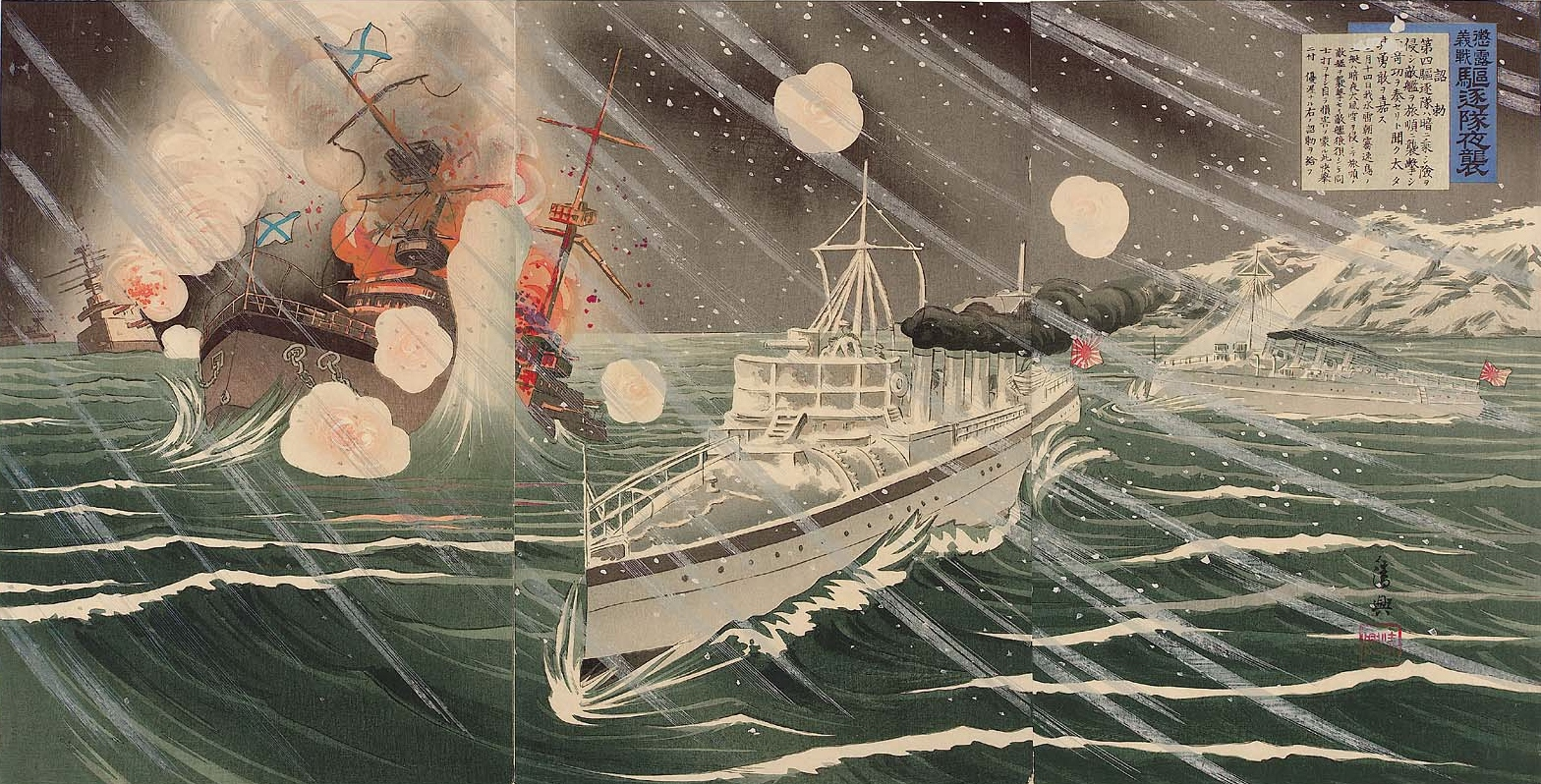
An ukiyo-e print of the night attack on Port Arthur by the Japanese Navy. The surprise attack was made possible by the intelligence gathering of Reilly and Ho Liang Shung.

Ho Liang Shung (April 15, 1879–May 14, 1952) was a Chinese engineer and spy.

In January 1904, Ho and Sidney Reilly stole the Port Arthur harbor defense plans for the Japanese navy, enabling it to navigate through the Russian minefield protecting the harbor, in the Battle of Port Arthur. The surprise attack was allegedly made possible by the intelligence gathering of Sidney Reilly and Ho Liang Shung in June.

Ho was a Chinese engineer working for the head marine architect Svirski. Ho Liang Shung had a detailed knowledge of the harbor defense plans.
