= Xenophon Kalamatiano =

American intelligence officer (1882–1923)

Xenophon de Blumenthal Kalamatiano
- Born: July 14, 1882; Austria-Hungary
- Died: November 9, 1923 (aged 41)
- Education: University of Chicago
- Occupations: Intelligence officer; spy
- Known for: Implication in the Ambassadors' Plot to assassinate Lenin

Xenophon de Blumenthal Kalamatiano (14 July 1882 – 9 November 1923) was an American intelligence agent recruited from the University of Chicago to serve in Russia as part of the Allied intervention in the Russian Civil War.

Along with co-conspirator Boris Savinkov, he was implicated in the Ambassadors' Plot to assassinate Vladimir Lenin in 1918, which the press misnamed the Lockhart—Reilly plot, after two of its principal agents. The plot failed after it was eventually uncovered by the Cheka, and the Bolsheviks responded by escalating the Red Terror.

According to Barnes Carr, U.S. Secretary of State Robert Lansing initiated the plot after Lenin seized power in October 1917 and removed Russia from the World War I.

== Early life and education ==
Born in Austria, the only son of a Greek father and a Russian mother, he became the chief field agent for DeWitt Clinton Poole, U.S. Consul General in Moscow, and American spymaster in Revolutionary Russia.

Kalamatiano was a student at University of Chicago and became involved with the "Chicago Group" of Russophiles and information gathers that included the university president William Rainey Harper and philanthropist and world traveller Charles Richard Crane Dr. Harper's son Samuel N. Harper joined the group, and as the US did not have a CIA at the time, an as overseas spies in the U.S. State Department and Office of Naval Intelligence were hampered by budgets and politics, reports from "U.S. casuals" and affiliated citizens were solicited.
