= William Melville =

British spy

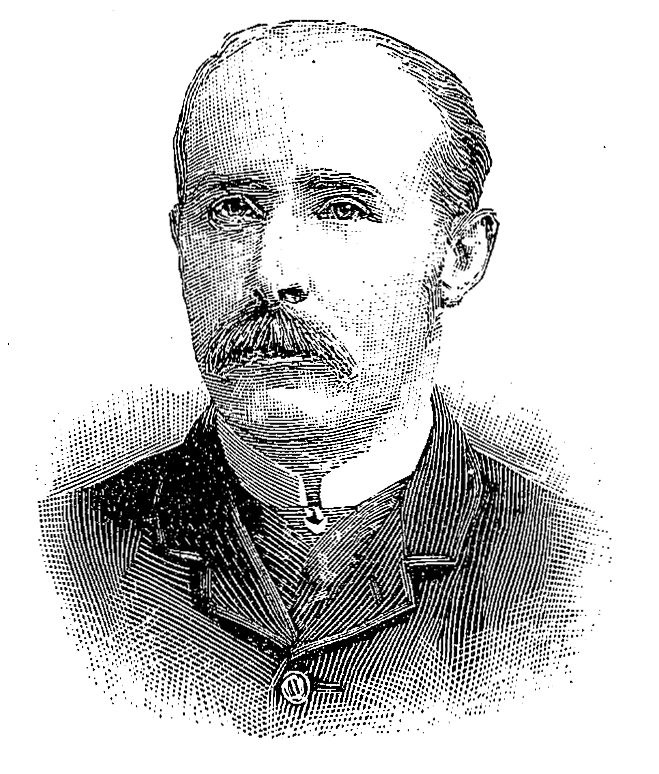
- Born: 25 April 1850; Sneem, County Kerry, Ireland
- Died: 1 February 1918 (aged 67); London, England
- Occupations: Detective, Spymaster
- Spouses: Kate Reilly; Amelia Foy
- Children: 4, including James Melville
- Espionage activity
- Allegiance: United Kingdom
- Service branch: Secret Service Bureau
- Rank: Head of the British Secret Service Bureau
- Codename: M
- Codename: William Morgan

William Melville (25 April 1850 – 1 February 1918) was an Irish law enforcement officer and the first chief of the British Secret Service Bureau.

== Birth ==
William Melville was born into a Roman Catholic family in Direenaclaurig Cross, Sneem, County Kerry, the son of a baker and publican. He moved to London in the 1860s and followed his father's footsteps as a baker before he joined the Metropolitan Police in 1872.

== Scotland Yard ==
In 1882 he was chosen to be one of the founding members of the Special Irish Branch that was founded to work against Fenians and anarchists. Melville was posted to the Le Havre port, during which posting his children, James Benjamin (1885) (later Sir James Melville KC) and Cecile Victorinne (1886; died in London in 1891), were born. In December 1888 Melville returned to London and was assigned to protect the Shah of Persia in his state visit. His duties later expanded to the protection of British royal family and he foiled the Jubilee Plot against Queen Victoria in 1887. In 1891 he began to campaign against anarchists by raiding and wrecking anarchist clubs and underground printing houses. He also revealed the Walsall Plot.

In 1893 Melville became Superintendent of Scotland Yard's Special Branch when his predecessor John Littlechild retired to become a private investigator. When he fired veteran sergeant Patrick McIntyre, McIntyre went to the press and claimed that Melville had instigated the whole Walsall Plot himself, a claim vindicated by police files released over 80 years later.

In the next ten years, Melville embarked on a large series of well-publicized raids against anarchists. He went to Victoria Station to personally arrest bomber Théodule Meunier. In 1896 Melville recruited Shlomo Rosenblum (later known as Sidney Reilly) as an informer in an organization he suspected to be involved with Russian anarchists.

In 1901 he worked with Gustav Steinhauer of the German Secret Service to thwart a plot against the Kaiser during the state funeral of Queen Victoria. In June 1900 Melville met future stage magician Harry Houdini when he came to Scotland Yard to showcase his abilities as an escapologist. When Houdini released himself easily from the police handcuffs, Melville befriended him and reputedly learned lock picking.

On 1 November 1903, Melville resigned as superintendent but was secretly recruited to lead a new intelligence section in the War Office, MO3, which was redesignated M05 in 1907. Working under commercial cover from an unassuming flat in London under the alias persona William Morgan, Melville ran both counterintelligence and foreign intelligence operations, capitalizing on the knowledge and foreign contacts he had accumulated during his years running Special Branch. In 1909 the Government Committee on Intelligence, with advocacy of Richard Burden Haldane and Winston Churchill, established a new Secret Service Bureau with a Home Section under command of Captain Sir Vernon Kell and a Foreign Section under Commander Sir Mansfield Cumming. Melville's unit was folded into Kell's department, which, while acting in Home matters, remained subordinate to the War Office. By 1910 it was clear that the Home Section and the Foreign Section would seek their own identities, and Kell's department, the Security Service separated from Cummings' Secret Intelligence Service.

According to the conclusions of author Andrew Cook, his biographer, which are not accepted by all historians, Melville then became the head of British Secret Service with the code name "M". Still, the service had a small budget and on occasion, Melville had to do the job himself.

== Secret Service Bureau ==
Melville's own section continued as a separate Special Section of the Secret Service Bureau and he concentrated on looking for German spies. In August 1914 the Bureau eventually identified the barbershop of Karl Gustav Ernst as the centre of a German spy ring.

== Death ==
William Melville died in London of kidney failure in February 1918.

== See also ==
- Sir Mansfield Smith-Cumming
- Sidney Reilly
- Sir Robert Bruce Lockhart
- Vernon Kell
- Sir James Melville KC son, eminent barrister, MP for Gateshead and Solicitor General in Ramsay MacDonald government – died in office aged 46. Had successfully defended anarchists; also unsuccessfully acted in an appeal against the obscenity decision re: Radclyffe Hall's The Well of Loneliness. Married to Sarah Tugander, Bonar Law's former secretary.

== Sources ==
- Andrew, Christopher (2009). The Defence of the Realm: The authorized history of MI5. Allen Lane. ISBN 978-0713998856.

Police appointments
Preceded by John Littlechild	Head of Special Branch, Metropolitan Police; 1893–1903	Succeeded by Patrick Quinn
Government offices
Preceded by First Holder	Head of SIS; 1903–1909	Succeeded by Mansfield Smith-Cumming
Preceded by First Holder	Director General of MI5; 1903–1909	Succeeded by Vernon Kell
