= Bruce Lockhart family =

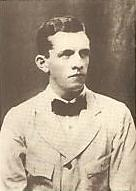
R. H. Bruce Lockhart, in Malaya, 1909

The Bruce Lockhart family is of Scottish origins, and several members have played rugby football for Scotland, but since the early 20th century most have lived and worked in England or Canada, or else overseas, in India, Malaya, Australia, Russia, Rhodesia, Fiji, and elsewhere.

== Origins ==
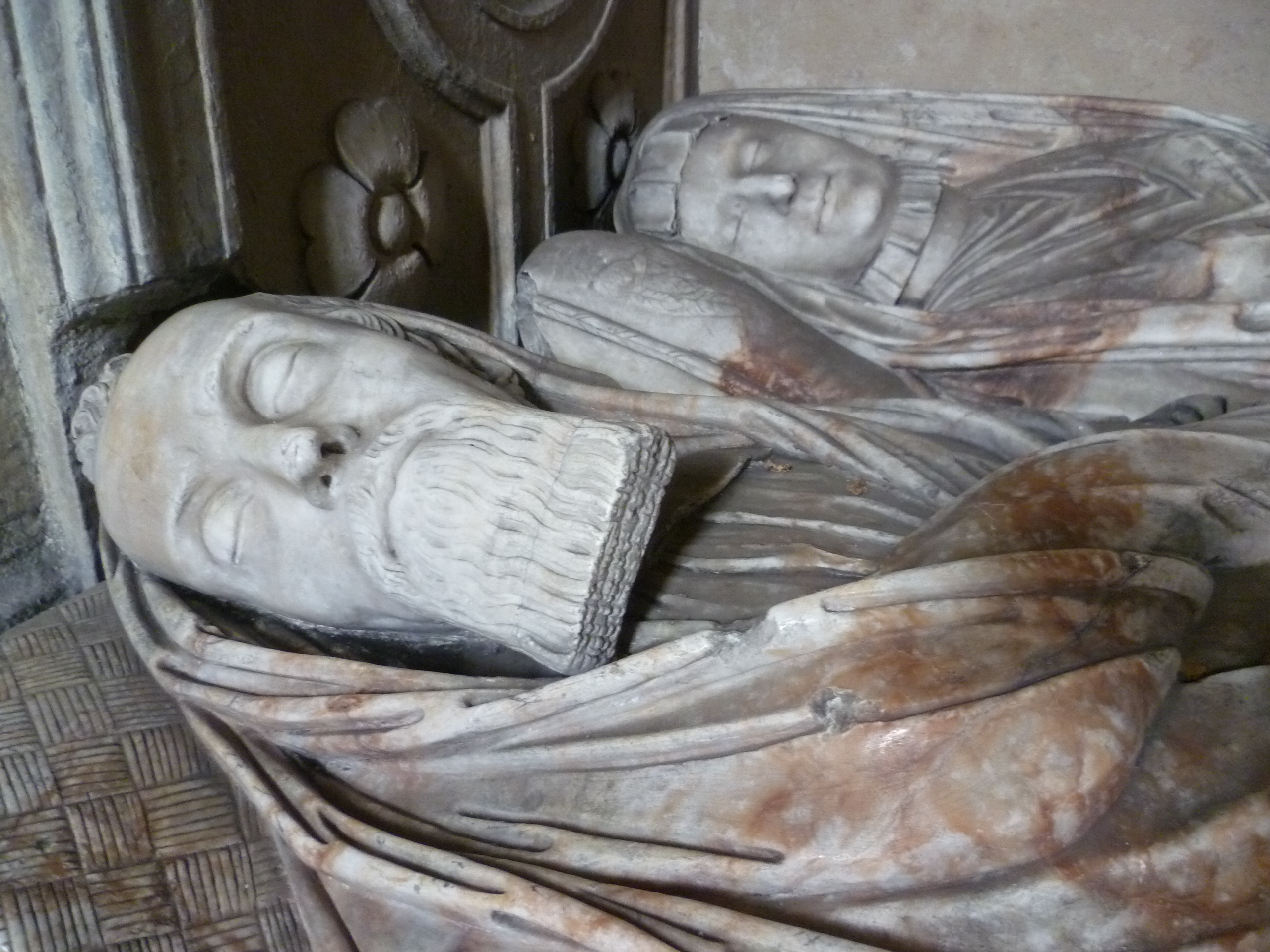
Sir George Bruce, a 16th-century ancestor, in Culross Abbey

The first of the family to combine the two names was the schoolmaster Robert Bruce Lockhart (12 February 1858 — 18 Nov 1949), born at Montreal in Upper Canada and a graduate of the University of Edinburgh, who was the son of Robert Arthur Lockhart (1832–1904) and Annabella Wilson (1833–1888), both of whom had been born in Glasgow and died in Edinburgh. His mother was a daughter of William Wilson and Annabella Bruce (1807–1884) herself a daughter of James Hamilton Bruce (1783–1823), who was a great-great-grandson of Alexander Bruce, 2nd Earl of Kincardine. He was descended from Thomas Bruce, 1st Baron of Clackmannan, as are most Bruces, including the Chiefs of Clan Bruce. Thomas Bruce is known to have been related to Robert the Bruce (1274–1329), king of Scotland, but how is not clear.

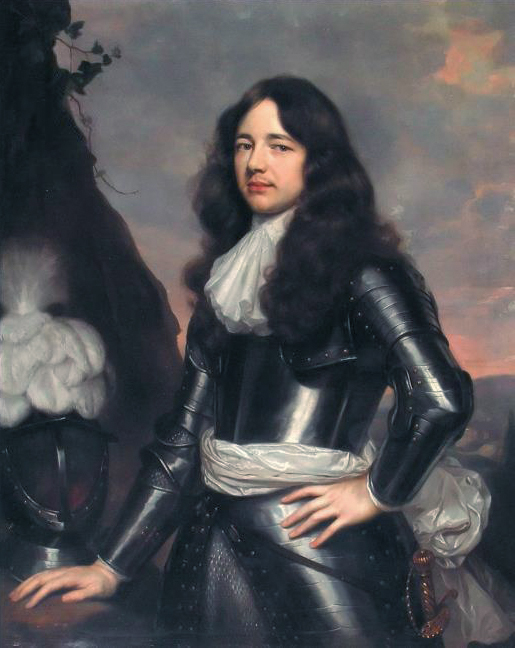
Alexander Bruce (1629-1680)

Lockhart was headmaster of several schools: first the Waid Academy, at Anstruther, then Spier's School, Beith, a new school. In 1895 he founded Seafield House Preparatory School at Broughty Ferry, and in 1906 bought Eagle House School, at Sandhurst, Berkshire. For Lockhart, the name Bruce was a middle Christian name, celebrating distinguished ancestors, and most of his sons also had it as a middle name, their surname as registered at the General Register Office remaining simply Lockhart. However, by the use of the name by almost all the men of the family, and later by all its daughters, too, the name Bruce has come to be regarded as part of the surname, in some cases leading to the adoption of a hyphen.

== Family character ==
In his book Dragon Days (2013), James Bruce Lockhart sums up the family character when he arrived at the Dragon School in 1949: "The Bruce Lockhart family were schoolmasters, imperial soldiers, and diplomats, they taught, directed, and administered; and they played games in their spare time; muscular Christianity was their thing."

== Family members ==
Robert Bruce Lockhart married Florence Stewart McGregor (1864–1928), who had been born in Riverton, New Zealand. Both were Scottish by descent, and in My Scottish Youth, their eldest son claimed "There is no drop of English blood in my veins." Their children and descendants are:

- Sir Robert Hamilton Bruce Lockhart (1887–1970), or Bertie, later sometimes known as Sir Bruce Lockhart, diplomat, spy, and author, in 1913 he married firstly Jean Bruce Haslewood, and in 1948 secondly Frances Mary Beck; he was the father of
  - Robert Norman Bruce Lockhart (1920–2008), naval intelligence officer, journalist, stockbroker, and author, known as Robin married 1st Margaret Graham Crookdake (born 1921), 2nd Ginette Martens, 3rd Eila Owen. Father of
    - Sheila Margaret Bruce Lockhart (born 1950)
- John Harold Bruce Lockhart (1889–1956), called Rufus, schoolmaster, Scotland footballer, cricketer, and headmaster of Sedbergh School from 1937 to 1954; married Alwine Mona Ivy Brougham (1891–1980) and was the father of
  - John Macgregor Bruce Lockhart (1914—1995), schoolmaster and deputy director of MI6; he married Margaret Hone, daughter of Campbell Hone, and had two sons and a daughter; he was the father of
    - James Robert Bruce Lockhart (1941–2018), diplomat, spy, author, and artist, the father of
      - Dugald Alastair Roddick Bruce Lockhart (born in Fiji, 1968), actor, married Penelope Rawlins and is the father of
        - Mackenzie Bruce Lockhart (born 2015)
      - Andrew John James Bruce Lockhart (born 1969)
    - Alexander John (Sandy) Bruce-Lockhart, Baron Bruce-Lockhart (1942–2008), a farmer in Southern Rhodesia who returned to farm in Kent and became leader of Kent County Council. He married Tessa D. Pressland in 1966 and was the father of
      - Mark Alexander Bruce Lockhart (born 1967), married Jessica Davina Burn in 2000, the father of
        - Jemima Kate Bruce-Lockhart (born 2002)
        - Isabel Anna Bruce-Lockhart (born 2004)
        - Olivia Rose Bruce-Lockhart (born 2007)
      - Emma Natasha Bruce Lockhart (born 1970), married 1999 Rupert John Sloane
        - Xanthe Clementine Sloane (born 2001)
        - India Victoria Sloane (born 2003)
      - Simon David Bruce-Lockhart FGA (born 1973), a ruby and sapphire buyer for Thaigem, and writer on precious stones, living in Chanthaburi
    - Sarah Katharine M. Lockhart (born 1955), married 1977 Michael C. Waller-Bridge
  - Rab Brougham Bruce Lockhart (1916–1990), schoolmaster and Scotland rugby footballer, head master of Loretto School from 1960 to 1976, married Helen Priscilla Lawrence Crump in 1941. Father of
    - Karen Bruce-Lockhart (born 1942), Edinburgh advocate and Writer to the Signet, governor of Sedbergh School
    - Alastair Kim Bruce-Lockhart (1946—1980), teacher and squash international, known as Kim, the father of
      - Anna Bruce-Lockhart (1977), editor living in Geneva, Switzerland
    - Malcolm Bruce Lockhart (born 1948) Harrow School teacher, living in Somerset
  - Dr Patrick Bruce Lockhart (1918—2009), called Paddy, obstetrician, President of the Ontario Medical Association, married firstly Mary Campbell Seddall, 1942, and after her death in December 1960 married secondly Eve Didychuk. He was the father of
    - Michael Bruce-Lockhart (born 1947), Professor of Computer Engineering at Memorial University of Newfoundland, 1979 to 2009, the father of
      - Cullam J. Bruce-Lockhart (born 1983), software designer
    - Simon C. Bruce-Lockhart (born 1949), headmaster of Albert College, Belleville, 1986–1990, then of Shawnigan Lake School, 1990–2000, Mulgrave School, 2003–2004, and Glenlyon Norfolk School, 2004–2015, the father of
      - Rab Bruce-Lockhart
      - Dr Katherine Bruce-Lockhart (born 1991), called Kate, a historian at the University of Toronto
    - Catherine Bruce Lockhart (born and died 1950)
    - Ferelyth Bruce-Lockhart (born 1954) Retired Team Lead Speech & Language Therapist at NHS Highland
    - Logie W. Bruce-Lockhart
    - Tacye Bruce-Lockhart (born 1961), Mrs McLagan
    - Patrick Bruce-Lockhart (born 1969), married Amanda Stack, is a technology executive
  - Logie Bruce Lockhart (1921–2020), Scotland rugby footballer, headmaster of Gresham's School, and author; he married Josephine Agnew in 1944, and they had two sons and three daughters:
    - Jennifer Bruce Lockhart (born 1945), called Jenny
    - Ruraidh Bruce Lockhart (born 1949)
    - Kirsten A. Bruce Lockhart, known as Kirsty (1953—1959)
    - Fiona Jacqueline Bruce-Lockhart (born 1957), married George P. S. Drye in 1983 and is a schoolteacher and Head of English
      - Alastair George Bruce-Lockhart Drye (born 1985) property developer
      - Dacre Bruce-Lockhart Drye (born 1985), author
    - Duncan Rhoderick Macgregor (Bede) Bruce-Lockhart (born 1967), executive of Piper Jaffray, later of Matrix
- Sir Robert McGregor MacDonald Lockhart (1893—1981), Commander-in-Chief, Indian Army, called Rob Lockhart. On 2 September 1918, in Mussoorie, India, he married Margaret Amy Campbell, daughter of Colonel Sir Robert Neil Campbell.
  - Mary Mavora Lockhart (1919–2000), who married firstly Alastair T. Scott (divorced) and secondly Henry Casselton Chapman
    - Sally Anne Scott(1943–1944)
    - Wendy Louise Chapman(1954–2000)
  - Lt. Col. Norman Neil Campbell Lockhart (1925–2020), named after Norman Douglas Stewart Bruce Lockhart and commissioned into his uncle's regiment, the Seaforth Highlanders. He married Audrey Carrol Beadon, daughter of Brigadier H. D. Beadon
  - Elizabeth Winifred (1924–1985), who married Major E. P. Woods, Welsh Guards
  - Phyllis Margaret, who married Lt. Cmdr James Mcnie Whyte R. N.
- Norman Douglas Stewart Bruce Lockhart (1894–1915), an officer in the Seaforth Highlanders, killed at the Battle of Loos. Before the war, he had played rugby union for London Scottish F.C.
- William Rupert Wilson Lockhart (1899–1993), known as Rupert Bruce Lockart, an opera teacher and actor
- Jean Frances Winifred Phyllis Lockhart, known as Freda Bruce Lockhart (1909–1987), actress, disability advocate and author, and film critic; married 1940 Hilton Roy Schleman, a film publicity director and writer on jazz.
