= Simon Bruce-Lockhart =

Scottish-Canadian schoolmaster

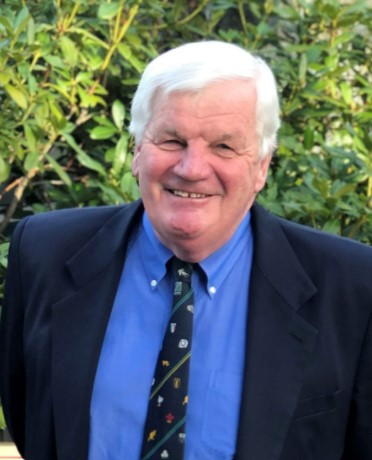
Simon Bruce-Lockhart at St. Margaret’s School

Simon C. Bruce-Lockhart (born 1949), is a Scottish-Canadian schoolmaster who taught at several schools in Canada between 1972 and 2015.

He was first an English and Mathematics teacher, and then also a housemaster, at his old school, Ridley College, and later a housemaster at Lakefield College School, then was successively Head of School at Albert College, Belleville, Shawnigan Lake School, Mulgrave School, and Glenlyon Norfolk School, the last three of which are in British Columbia.

== Early life ==
Bruce-Lockhart is one of the sons of Patrick Bruce Lockhart (1918–2009), an obstetrician, by his marriage in 1942 to Mary Campbell Seddall. His parents emigrated from Britain to Canada in 1953, and after his mother's death in 1960 his father remarried and had more children, two more sons and a daughter. He is the brother of Michael Bruce-Lockhart (born 1947), now retired as Professor of Computer Engineering at Memorial University of Newfoundland, and they also have a younger full sister, Ferelyth.

The Bruce Lockhart family has a long tradition of teaching. Bruce-Lockhart's grandfather, John Bruce Lockhart, was headmaster of Sedbergh School, in the north of England, and two of his uncles, Rab and Logie Bruce Lockhart, were headmasters who had played rugby union for Scotland. His great-grandfather, Robert Bruce Lockhart (1858–1950), was a Scottish headmaster born at Montreal, in Canada, and he lived long enough for them to meet.

Bruce-Lockhart was educated at Ridley College, Ontario, from 1962 to 1967, where he was a school prefect in his final year, and Yale, where he graduated BA.

== Career ==
Following in the family tradition, after Yale, Bruce-Lockhart trained for a teaching career. In 1972 he returned to Ridley College, his old school, as a master, to teach English and Mathematics, but took time out from 1975 to 1976 to spend a year at Dalhousie University studying law. He then returned to Ridley as housemaster of Gooderham House, before moving on in 1979 to Lakefield College School, in Selwyn, Ontario, again as a housemaster, and became also the school's director for admissions. In 1986 he was appointed as head of school at Albert College, Belleville, where he remained until 1990. After that, he was head of school at Shawnigan Lake School, on Vancouver Island, from 1990 to 2000, Mulgrave School, West Vancouver, in 2003–2004, and Glenlyon Norfolk School, also in British Columbia, from 2004 to 2015.

In 1990, shortly after his arrival at Shawnigan Lake School, Bruce-Lockhart persuaded Jason Dorland to come to the school as a rowing coach, and Dorland has described him as "a big man", a rugby, football, and hockey player with "gentleness and kindness about him".
