= Kim Bruce-Lockhart =

Scottish squash player (1946–1980)

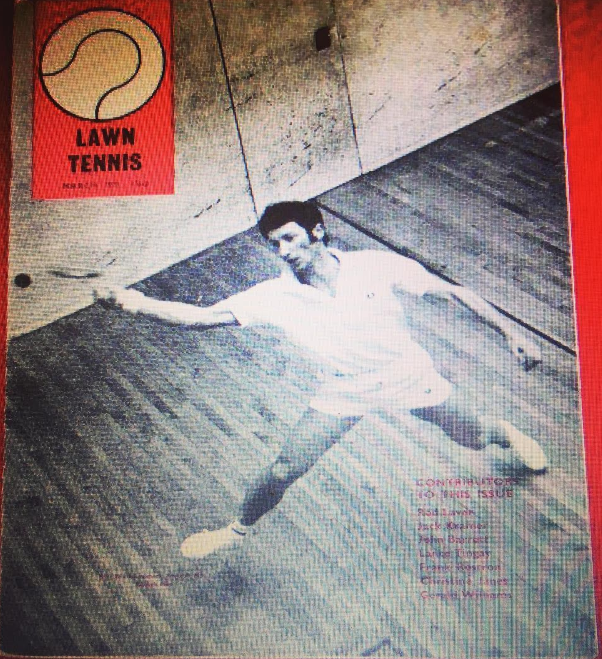
- Bruce-Lockhart on the cover of Lawn Tennis magazine

Personal information
- Born: 16 June 1946 Woking, Surrey, England
- Died: 15 January 1980 (aged 33)

Sport
Medal record
Representing Scotland
Men's squash
European Team Championships
Silver medal – second place	1973 Edinburgh	Team
Silver medal – second place	1974 Stockholm	Team
Silver medal – second place	1975 Dublin	Team
Silver medal – second place	1976 Brussels	Team
Bronze medal – third place	1977 Sheffield	Team
Bronze medal – third place	1978 Amsterdam	Team
Bronze medal – third place	1979 Hamburg	Team
National Championships
Gold medal – first place	1974	singles

Alistair Kim Bruce-Lockhart (16 June 1946 – 15 January 1980) was an English born professional squash player from the Bruce Lockhart family of Scotland.

== Biography ==
Bruce-Lockhart was born in Woking, Surrey, England, the son of educationist Rab Bruce Lockhart, who played rugby for Scotland. His grandfather John Bruce Lockhart was a dual rugby-cricket international for Scotland and headmaster of Sedbergh School. His uncle Logie was also a Scottish rugby international while his great-uncle Sir Robert Hamilton Bruce Lockhart was a diplomat, spy and rugby footballer.

From age 4 to 8, he lived in Ontario, Canada, before moving to Wanganui, New Zealand, and eventually returning to the United Kingdom. He was educated at Sedbergh School and St John's College, Cambridge, where he read Medieval and Modern Languages. After receiving coaching from Dick Hawkey he began playing squash for Cambridge and the Hampstead Club. He represented the Cambridge University squash team for the 1966, 1967 and 1968 varsity matches (the last as captain).

In 1968, he was capped by Scotland and played 59 times for his country. He participated in the British Open Squash Championships from 1970 until 1979. He also won the Scottish national title in 1974.

A blog by John Winn on Cricket Heritage described him as follows:

"An outstanding squash player who, after Sedbergh School, went up to Cambridge where he gained a Blue for squash, played a decent standard of cricket, 'a shrewd captain, an erratic spin bowler, and a superb batsman with an impeccable defence and an enthralling array of wristy attacking strokes' - qualities that earned him selection for Surrey II and should, some thought, have gained him a Blue. He captained the first XV at Sedbergh, a team that included Alastair Biggar and John Spencer, and of course the cricket team for which Wisden shows he was outstanding with both bat and ball. He was No 1 for Scotland at squash for almost ten years until aged 33 he dropped dead from a heart attack while playing a Cumberland Cup game in January 1980, leaving a wife and young family."

Bruce-Lockhart was buried in Harrow on the Hill, London.
