= Logie Bruce Lockhart =

Schoolmaster and Scottish rugby union player

Logie Bruce Lockhart (12 October 1921 – 7 September 2020) was a Scottish schoolmaster, writer, and journalist, in his youth a Scottish international rugby union footballer and for most of his teaching career headmaster of Gresham's School.

== Background ==
Born at Rugby in Warwickshire, Lockhart belonged to the Bruce Lockhart family, which has long traditions of teaching and playing rugby union and has branched out into other areas. His grandfather was a schoolmaster, while his father, John Bruce Lockhart, and one of his older brothers, Rab Bruce Lockhart, were both public school headmasters who had played rugby union for Scotland. Another brother, J. M. Bruce Lockhart, was an intelligence officer, and a third brother, Patrick, was an obstetrician who fenced for Scotland.

Lockhart’s uncle, Sir Robert Bruce Lockhart (1887–1970), was an author and adventurer whose son, Robin Bruce Lockhart, became an author. One nephew was Sandy Bruce-Lockhart, Baron Bruce-Lockhart; another, Kim Bruce-Lockhart, played squash for Scotland. A great-nephew, Dugald, is an actor and director.

== Early life ==
Lockhart was educated at Cargilfield School, Edinburgh, Sedbergh School, where his father was Headmaster and he became Head Boy, and then at St John's College, Cambridge, as a choral scholar, with a scholarship. However, with the Second World War just beginning he enlisted in the 9th Sherwood Foresters. Later during the war he served in the Life Guards in France and Germany and was one of the first British soldiers to enter Bergen-Belsen concentration camp.

After the war, Lockhart continued his interrupted education at Cambridge, where he read French and German, won the Wright Prize for Modern Languages, and was both a rugby union and a squash rackets Blue. He gained a double first, and his degree was later promoted to MA.

Lockhart wrote of his time at Cambridge

We hardly attended any lectures, except to get a book list at the beginning of the year, so we were able to read an unusually large number of books. Our view on lectures was that little was to be gained by attending them... Supervisors’ tutorials were potentially far more valuable, but the standard varied from the sublime to the ridiculous.

== Rugby ==
While playing rugby union for Cambridge, Lockhart joined London Scottish, of which he was later captain. The first time he was called on to play for Scotland was in a Calcutta Cup match at Twickenham against England on 20 March 1948, when he unusually played at centre and Scotland won 6-3, taking the trophy. The rest of his international career was at fly half. In 1950, he scored his first points for Scotland by a conversion in a match against France at Murrayfield. He was in the wilderness for three years, but in 1953 was recalled to play in the Five Nations championship against Ireland and then against England on 21 March 1953, his last appearance for Scotland, at a time when the team was in a long losing run.

At the time of his death, Lockhart was the oldest Scottish international.

== Teaching career ==
From Cambridge, Lockhart followed in a long family tradition by deciding to enter the teaching profession. He became an assistant schoolmaster and rugby union coach at Tonbridge School, and then in 1955, at the age of 33, was appointed as Headmaster of Gresham's School, Holt.

He became Chairman of the Eastern Division of the Headmasters' Conference in the 1970s and broke new ground by inviting the heads of the Girls' Schools Association to attend HMC meetings. In 1977, he argued that five subjects, rather than three, should be taught in sixth forms, and that this could be made possible by universities teaching more inter-disciplinary and creative courses.

Lockhart retired as Headmaster of Gresham's School at the end of the Summer Term of 1982. Interviewing him for The Illustrated London News, Roger Berthoud noted his view that “children should have privacy and a little kingdom of their own” and commented that he would be a hard act to follow.

== Journalist and author ==
For sixty years, Logie Bruce Lockhart contributed articles to magazines and newspapers, from Country Life and Rugby World to She. He wrote mostly on education, fishing, sport, and wildlife.

Lockhart's first book, The Pleasures of Fishing (1981) was about his adventures as a fly fisherman, mostly in England and Scotland. His second book, Stuff and Nonsense, gave the philosophy of a retired headmaster and thoughts on educational topics of the previous half century, the 'Stuff', while a variety of essays on rugby, fly fishing, camping in old age, wind-surfing in France, and so forth provided the 'Nonsense'.

Now We Are Very Old (2012) is a collection of Lockhart’s cautionary verses for the elderly, while Now And Then, This And That (2013) is a reflection on his family history, his experiences in the Second World War, the changes in education during his teaching career, and the changes in society during his lifetime. British Bird Watching for Beginners & Enthusiasts (2018), written for his grandchildren and illustrated with his own watercolours, explored his lifetime passion for ornithology. As a boy, he was taught to paint birds by Talbot Kelly.

== Personal life ==
In 1944, while returning to his regiment, Lockhart got on a train at Oxenholme and took a seat opposite Josephine Agnew. They found a shared interest in the poetry of Rupert Brooke and were married within weeks, later going on to have two sons and three daughters. His wife died at Holt in 2009, aged 86. Their daughter Jennifer Bruce-Lockhart became a teacher of music in Paris. Their son Rhuraidh Bruce-Lockhart is a property developer in Norfolk. Fiona Drye was a Head of English who gained a 'Teacher Trailblazer' award from the Poetry Society for her work. Bede Bruce-Lockhart played rugby union for Scotland B and worked in the City of London. Their sister Kirsty was killed in a car accident in childhood.

A granddaughter, Chelsea Bruce Lockhart, is a data journalist at the Financial Times. One grandson, Nicolas, works in property management. Grandsons Alastair and Dacre Drye are property developers in Lisbon and Brazil respectively.

Lockhart died in September 2020 at the age of 98 and was buried at St Andrew's parish church, Holt, Norfolk.

== Books ==
- Trois Aveugles et Autres Contes (Oxford University Press, New Oxford French Readers, 1954) ISBN 0-19-832219-4, ISBN 978-0-19-832219-1
- The Pleasures of Fishing (A & C Black, London, 1981) ISBN 0-7136-2136-2
- Stuff and Nonsense: Observations of a Norfolk Scot (The Larks Press, 1981) ISBN 0-948400-40-4
- Dick Bagnall-Oakeley, A tribute to a Norfolk Naturalist (The Gallpen Press Limited)
- Now We Are Very Old (2012)
- Now and Then, This and That (Larks Press, 2013), autobiography
- British Bird Watching for Beginners & Enthusiasts (Bar well Print Ltd, 2018)

== Selected articles ==
- 'Tom Brown's Ghost Walks' in The Times (London), 6 July 1967, p. 7
- 'Co-education in public schools', in The Spectator, 20 April 1974, pp. 479–80
- 'Crisis and Politics in England', in St. Croix Review (Stillwater, Minn., 1974)
- 'A new programme for Christian education' in The Times (London), 5 July 1975, p. 14
- 'Why Oxbridge must look to its students' in The Times (London), 4 October 1977, p. 18
- 'On Highlands Fishing', in Country Life, 1992
- 'Hooked on angling' in Scots Magazine, new series, vol. 123, no. 3, June 1985, pp. 282–286
