= Dugald Bruce Lockhart =

Anglo-Scottish stage & screen actor, director & writer

- Born: 1968 (age 56–57); Fiji
- Occupation: Actor

Dugald Bruce Lockhart is an Anglo-Scottish stage and screen actor, director and writer.

== Background and education ==
A member of the Bruce Lockhart family, Lockhart was born in Fiji in 1968, the son of James Robert Bruce Lockhart (1941–2018), a diplomat, spy, artist, and author, and Felicity A. Smith. His grandfather, J. M. Bruce Lockhart, was an intelligence officer. His great-grandfather, J. H. Bruce Lockhart, and his great-uncles Rab Bruce Lockhart and Logie Bruce Lockhart, were all public school headmasters who played rugby union for Scotland. Another forebear, Sir Robert Bruce Lockhart, was an author and adventurer. His late uncle Sandy Bruce-Lockhart, Baron Bruce-Lockhart, was a politician.

Dugald Bruce Lockhart was educated at Sedbergh School and the University of St Andrews, then trained for a career in acting at the Royal Academy of Dramatic Art.

== Career ==
Lockhart began as a stage actor, working with the Royal Shakespeare Company, the National Theatre and others. Since 1998, he has acted mostly with Propeller, an all-male theatre company of which he is now an associate director. He is also an associate of the Teatre Akadèmia Theatre Company in Barcelona and has directed Romeo and Juliet and As You Like It in Catalan, using new translations by Miquel Desclot. He teaches and directs at drama schools in London, including the Royal Central School of Speech and Drama, LAMDA, and the Italia Conti Academy of Theatre Arts.

He played David Cameron in The Three Lions, a comedy written by William Gaminara, a role for which he was nominated as best actor by The Stage at the Edinburgh Festival of 2013. Lockhart returned to the role when the play was later staged at the St James Theatre, London, in 2015, and stayed with the production when it moved on to the Liverpool Playhouse.

He is the author of a handbook for actors called Heavy Pencil, and of a thriller, The Lizard, published in 2020.

== Family ==
Dugald Bruce-Lockhart is married to the actress Penelope Rawlins. They have a son, born in May 2015, and a daughter, born in 2019.

== Filmography ==
- Case Histories – Brian Jackson
- Walter's War – Captain Coombes
- High Plains Invaders – Cornelius Harrington
- Hotel Babylon – Tennyson
- Foyle's War – Ralph Hammond (A War of Nerves, 2004)
- The Bill – Stewart Ryan
- Trust – Dougie Baker
- Plunge: The Movie – Chas
- Midsomer Murders – Greg Tutt (Ring Out Your Dead, 2002)
- Simon: An English Legionnaire (2002) – Corporal Muller
- Rockface – Gavin (episode #1.2, 2002)
- Hart's War (2002) – Capt. Lutz
- Brookside – Mark Wilcox (1999–2000)
- Wycliffe – P.C. Greener
- Bugs – Alex
