= James Bruce Lockhart =

British diplomat, intelligence officer, author, & artist

James Robert "Jamie" Bruce Lockhart (14 March 1941 – 27 October 2018) was a British diplomat, intelligence officer, author, and artist. The son of diplomat J. M. Bruce Lockhart and grandson of Scottish rugby international John Bruce Lockhart, he gained a modern languages degree from the University of Cambridge before beginning a career with the Foreign Office. However, this work was in fact a cover for his real work with the Secret Intelligence Service (MI6). In later years, Lockhart became a published author, with works including a biography of Hugh Clapperton and a book about life in an English preparatory school. He was the father of actor Dugald Bruce Lockhart.

== Early life ==
Born in March 1941 at Sedbergh, which was then in the West Riding of Yorkshire, Lockhart was the son of J. M. Bruce Lockhart (1914–1995), by his marriage in 1939 to Margaret Hone, a daughter of Campbell Hone, Bishop of Wakefield. His grandfather was John Bruce Lockhart, a Scottish rugby international who was then a schoolmaster at Rugby School and later became head of Sedbergh School. James was educated at the Dragon School, Oxford, Sedbergh School, and St John's College, Cambridge, where he read modern languages. He was able to maintain a flair for languages all through his life.

His father was a schoolmaster, headmaster at Sedbergh, and then a wartime intelligence officer who became deputy director of MI6, and was a brother of Sir Robert Bruce Lockhart, British diplomat and intelligence officer, who had been closely connected with Sidney Reilly at the time of the February Revolution in Russia and had written the best-selling Memoirs of a British Agent (1932). With a long history of espionage in his family, it was natural for the young Lockhart to have the ambition of following in his father's and uncle's footsteps, and he did.

== Career ==
After graduating from Cambridge in 1963, Lockhart became a diplomat and intelligence officer, and on his hidden career he later had little to say, except that he had followed a similar path to that of John Le Carré in Germany. He took the Foreign Office entrance examination, coming top in the Greek paper. In 1988, he was listed in The Diplomatic Service List as a First Secretary (Commercial). However, an obituary in The Sunday Times stated that his "ostensible career in the Foreign Office masked his real work with the Secret Intelligence Service (MI6)". He joined MI6 in 1973, and the skill he had in foreign languages was important in his work for it, especially his knowledge of Russian in a posting to Vienna.

While he was posted to Lagos in the late 1980s, Lockhart read Hugh Clapperton's Journal of a Second Expedition, published posthumously in 1829, and was inspired to make the same cross-country expedition from the Atlantic coast to the desert and from Lake Chad to Borgu. He also studied the route Richard Lander had taken when making his way back to the coast after Clapperton's death. This led Lockhart to publish editions of Clapperton's work and eventually to write a life of him, A Sailor in the Sahara, published in 2007. He also wrote other books. In 2013 he wrote Dragon Days, a book about his prep school years in Oxford, with the help of his contemporary Alan Macfarlane.

Reviewing his two earlier Clapperton editions, Anthony Kirk-Greene said in The Journal of African History "James Bruce-Lockhart has made a significant archival addition to our knowledge of the literary legacy of Hugh Clapperton".

In retirement, Lockhart settled at Southwold and then Saxmundham, in Suffolk, and was notable as a watercolour artist, with several solo exhibitions, signing his work J. R. Bruce Lockhart.

== Private life ==
In 1967 Lockhart married Felicity A. Smith at Kensington. Their eldest son Dugald Bruce Lockhart, who became an actor, was born while they were on a posting in Fiji in 1968.

He was the older brother of Sandy Bruce-Lockhart, Baron Bruce-Lockhart (1942–2008), and they also had one sister. Lockhart died of heart failure on 27 October 2018, aged 77.

== Selected publications ==
- James R. Bruce Lockhart, Clapperton in Borno: Journals of the Travels in Borno of Lieutenant Hugh Clapperton RN, from January 1823 to September 1824 (Cologne, 1996)
- James R. Bruce-Lockhart, John Wright, Difficult and Dangerous Roads: Hugh Clapperton's Travels in Sahara and Fezzan 1822–1825 (London: Sickle Moon Books, 2000)
- Jamie Bruce Lockhart, A Sailor in the Sahara: The Life and Travels in Africa of Hugh Clapperton, Commander RN (I B Tauris & Co Ltd, 2007, ISBN 978-1845114794)
- Jamie Bruce Lockhart, Loch Longs: The Third Quarter-Century 1987–2012 (Peridot Press, 2011, ISBN 978-1908095213)
- Jamie Bruce Lockhart, Alan Macfarlane, Dragon Days: The Dragon School, Oxford, 1949–1955 (CreateSpace Independent Publishing, 2013, ISBN 978-1492129400)
- Jamie Bruce Lockhart, Sedbergh Letters (CreateSpace Independent Publishing, 2013, ISBN 978-1494360634)
- Jamie Bruce Lockhart, African Footsteps: From the Guinea coast to the desert's edge (CreateSpace Independent Publishing, 2013, ISBN 978-1492339137)
