= Rab Bruce Lockhart =

Scotland international rugby union player

- Born: Rab Brougham Bruce Lockhart; 1 December 1916 Rugby, Warwickshire, England
- Died: 1 May 1990 (aged 73) Burneside, England
- Notable relative(s): John Bruce Lockhart, father Logie Bruce Lockhart, brother Patrick Bruce Lockhart, brother R. H. Bruce Lockhart, uncle

Rugby union career
- Position: Fly half
Amateur team(s)
Years	Team	Apps	(Points)
- Cambridge University
–	London Scottish		
Provincial / State sides
Years	Team	Apps	(Points)
1938	Scotland Probables		
1938	Scotland Possibles		
International career
Years	Team	Apps	(Points)
1937-39	Scotland	3	(0)

Rab Brougham Bruce Lockhart (1 December 1916 – 1 May 1990) was a Scottish soldier and schoolmaster, notable for his sporting career as a Scotland international at rugby union and as a member of the Scotland national cricket team. He became headmaster of Wanganui Collegiate School in New Zealand and later of Loretto School in Scotland.

== Early life ==
Lockhart was one of the sons of John Bruce Lockhart, a rugby and cricket international for Scotland and headmaster of Sedbergh School. The Bruce Lockhart family included his uncle Sir Robert Hamilton Bruce Lockhart, a notable rugby footballer, spy, and journalist, whose son Robin wrote Reilly, Ace of Spies. He was educated at Sedbergh, Edinburgh Academy, and Corpus Christi College, Cambridge, where he studied Modern Languages. While at Cambridge he played rugby union for Cambridge University.

His brothers were Logie, a Scottish rugby international and later headmaster, John, who became Deputy Director of MI6, and Patrick, an obstetrician. Lord Bruce-Lockhart was his nephew.

== Rugby Union career ==
After leaving Cambridge, Bruce Lockhart played for London Scottish. He was then selected for the Scotland Probables side in a trial match against Scotland Possibles. The first trial on 18 December 1937 fell foul of the weather, but Lockhart turned out for the Probables on 15 January 1938. However it was a strange match, and the selectors confused many onlookers by using a variety of substitutes, which at the time was uncommon; Lockhart himself switched sides in the second half to play for the Possibles.

Between 1937 and 1939 he gained three caps for Scotland.

== Cricket career ==
Rab Bruce Lockhart also played three first-class matches for Cambridge University Cricket Club in the 1937 and 1938 seasons, with little success, and did not play in the University Match. However, he was selected for the Scotland national cricket team and was invited to play for Canada, but was unable to do so.

== Second World War and later career ==
With the outbreak of war in 1939, Lockhart enlisted as a Gunner in the Artillery. He was soon sent as a Cadet to the Honourable Artillery Company's 121st Officer Cadet Training Unit, and in May 1940 was commissioned as a Second Lieutenant into the Royal Regiment of Artillery.

From 1950 to 1954, Lockhart taught in Canada, then was appointed as headmaster of Wanganui Collegiate School, New Zealand, where he remained until 1960. He then headed Loretto School until 1976.

== Personal life ==
Lockhart married Helen Priscilla Lawrence Crump, and they had a daughter, Karen Bruce Lockhart, and two sons, Kim and Malcolm.

Rab Bruce Lockhart died at his home in Burneside, Cumbria, England, in 1990, aged 73, from a heart attack.
