= R. H. Bruce Lockhart =

British writer, spy and diplomat (1887–1970)

Sir R. H. Bruce Lockhart KCMG
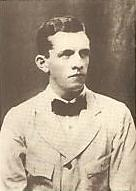
- R. H. Bruce Lockhart in Malaya, 1909

British Vice Consul in Moscow
- In office 1912–1915

Acting British Consul General in Moscow
- In office 1915–1915

British Consul General in Moscow
- In office 1915–1917

Head of the unofficial British mission / Unofficial Ambassador to the Bolsheviks
- In office 1917–1918

Deputy Under Secretary of State for Political Warfare Executive
- In office 1941–1945

Personal details
- Born: 2 September 1887
- Died: 27 February 1970 (aged 82)
- Spouse(s): Jean Bruce Haslewood (m. 1913) (1892-1983) Frances Mary Beck (m. 1948) (1913-1992)

Sir Robert Hamilton Bruce Lockhart, KCMG (2 September 1887 – 27 February 1970) was a British diplomat, journalist, author, and secret agent. His 1932 book Memoirs of a British Agent became an international bestseller by telling of his experiences in Russia in 1918 following the Bolshevik Revolution. He left the country after he was accused of having led a failed plot to assassinate Vladimir Lenin, the so-called Ambassadors' plot, a charge which he always denied.

== Background ==
He was born in Anstruther, Fife, the son of Robert Bruce Lockhart, the first Rector of the Waid Academy and later headmaster of Spier's School, Beith, Ayrshire, Scotland. His mother was Florence Stuart Macgregor, while his other ancestors include Bruces, Hamiltons, Cummings, Wallaces and Douglases. He claimed that he could trace a connection back to Boswell of Auchinleck. In Memoirs of a British Agent, he wrote, "There is no drop of English blood in my veins." He attended Fettes College, in Edinburgh.

His family were mostly schoolmasters, but his younger brother, Sir Robert McGregor MacDonald Lockhart, became an Indian Army general. On 15 August 1947, the day British India was partitioned into two independent Dominions of India and Pakistan, he was appointed as the last Commander-in-Chief of the Indian Army. His brother John Bruce Lockhart was the headmaster of Sedbergh School, and his nephews Rab Bruce Lockhart and Logie Bruce Lockhart went on to become headmasters of Loretto and Gresham's. His great-nephew, Simon Bruce-Lockhart, was the headmaster of Glenlyon Norfolk School.

== Career ==
=== Malaya ===
At 21, Lockhart went out to Malaya to join two uncles who were rubber planters there. According to his own account, he was sent to open up a new rubber estate near Pantai in Negeri Sembilan, in a district in which "there were no other white men". He then "caused a minor sensation by carrying off Amai, the beautiful ward of the Dato' Klana, the local Malay prince... my first romance". However, three years in Malaya, and one with Amai, came to an end when "doctors pronounced Malaria, but there were many people who said that I had been poisoned". One of his uncles and one of his cousins "bundled my emaciated body into a motor car and... packed me off home via Japan and America". The Dato' Klana in question was the chief of Sungei Ujong, the most important of the Nine States of Negeri Sembilan, whose palace was at Ampangan.

=== First Moscow posting ===
In September 1911, Lockhart passed the examination for the British Consular Service and in January 1912 was posted to Moscow as vice-consul. He was acting British Consul-General in Moscow for much of the First World War, from 1914 to 1917. He was present when the February Revolution broke out in early 1917 but left shortly before the Bolshevik Revolution later that year. Lockhart states, "I left St. Petersburg just as the Kerensky-Korniloff duel was starting. I arrived in London six weeks before the Bolshevik revolution."

At the time of his arrival in Russia in 1912, people had heard that a great footballer named Lockhart from Cambridge was arriving, and he was invited to turn out for Morozov, a cotton mill soccer team that played its games some thirty miles east of Moscow. The manager of the team was from Lancashire, England. Lockhart played for most of the 1912 season, and his team won the Moscow league championship that year. The gold medal that he won is in the collection of the National Library of Scotland. The great player, however, was Lockhart's brother, John, who had played rugby union for Scotland, and by his own admission Lockhart barely deserved his place in the team and played simply for the love of the sport.

=== Return to Moscow ===
In January 1918, at the behest of the British Prime Minister David Lloyd George and Lord Milner, the Secretary of State for War, Lockhart returned to Russia as the United Kingdom's first envoy to Bolshevik Russia, in an attempt to counteract German influence. (As Britain did not have diplomatic relations with the Bolsheviks, officially Lockhart was Head of a Special Mission.) Lockhart also worked for the Secret Intelligence Service, having been given £648 worth of diamonds to fund the creation of an agent network in Russia. Moura Budberg, the wife of a high-ranking Czarist diplomat, Count Johann von Benckendorff, became his mistress.

When the wartime foreign correspondent Arthur Ransome was arrested in 1919 for spying for the Bolsheviks, Lockhart spoke out for him, saying Ransome had been a valuable intelligence asset amid the worst chaos of the revolution. Lockhart also helped Trotsky's secretary, Evgenia Petrovna Shelepina, with whom Ransome had fallen in love, to leave Russia in 1919; she married Ransome in 1924.

=== Arrest and imprisonment ===
In 1918, Lockhart and British agent Sidney Reilly were alleged to have plotted to assassinate Bolshevik leader Vladimir Lenin. Lockhart and British officials condemned that as Soviet propaganda. He was accused of leading the "Lockhart Plot" against the Bolshevik regime and, for a time during 1918, was confined in the Kremlin as a prisoner and feared being condemned to death. However, he escaped trial via an exchange for his counterpart, Maksim Maksimovich Litvinov, the Bolshevik government's representative in London, who had been arrested for engaging in propaganda activities.

Lockhart was tried in absentia before the Supreme Revolutionary Tribunal in a proceeding, which opened 25 November 1918. Some 20 defendants faced charges in the trial, most of whom had worked for the Americans or the British in Moscow, in the case levied by procurator Nikolai Krylenko. The case concluded on 3 December 1918, with two defendants sentenced to be shot and various others sentenced to terms of prison or forced labour for terms up to five years. Lockhart and Reilly were both sentenced to death in absentia, with the sentence to be executed if they were ever found in Soviet Russia again.

Some research suggests that the "Lockhart Plot" was a sting operation orchestrated by Felix Dzerzhinsky with the goal of discrediting the British and French governments.

=== Between the wars ===
On 17 November 1919, Lockhart was appointed commercial secretary of the British legation in Prague. In late 1922, with the personal debts he ran up exceeding his official salary and feeling the need for change, he resigned from the Foreign Service to accept a position in Prague with the Anglo-Czechoslovak Bank, on whose creation he had worked. In 1925, Lockhart moved to a job with the Anglo-International Bank, based in London but specializing in central European affairs.

In April 1927, he became consul-general of Austria for England and Wales.

By 1928, again in debt and bored, Lockhart sought a new career in journalism.

After leaving the world of finance, Lockhart joined Lord Beaverbrook's Evening Standard. He served as the editor of the paper's Londoner's Diary column and became known for his hard-drinking and semi-debauched lifestyle. It enhanced his reputation that, despite having been caught by the Russians and exchanged for a Soviet agent, he remained on unusually cordial terms with the Soviet Embassy in London, from whom he received an annual gift of caviar. He also helped to organise Beaverbrook's Empire Free Trade Crusade campaign.

Throughout his life, Lockhart wrote detailed diaries for his own use. In the 1930s, he began to turn these into books for publication, which were successful enough to allow him to take up writing as a full-time career in 1937. In his autobiography Memoirs of a British Agent (1932), which became a best-seller, and whose chapters on the Russian Revolution Warner Brothers turned into the 1934 film British Agent, he wrote about his experiences in Malaya and Russia. In his second volume of autobiography, Retreat from Glory (1934), he turned his attention to his experiences in central Europe. Many other books followed, and eventually large extracts from his diaries between 1915 and 1965 were published in two volumes.

=== Later life ===
During the Second World War, Lockhart returned to government service. He became director-general of the Political Warfare Executive, co-ordinating all British propaganda against the Axis powers. He was also for a time the British liaison officer to the Czechoslovak government-in-exile under President Edvard Beneš. Lockhart recounted his activities from the Munich Crisis to VJ-Day in another volume of autobiography, Comes the Reckoning (1947). After the war, he resumed writing, lecturing and broadcasting and made a weekly BBC Radio broadcast to Czechoslovakia for over ten years.

== Personal life ==
In 1913, Lockhart married firstly Jean Adelaide Haslewood Turner of Brisbane, Australia, and they had a son, the author Robin Bruce Lockhart, who wrote the book Ace of Spies (1967) – about his father's friend, the agent Sidney Reilly – from which the television serial Reilly, Ace of Spies (1983) was later produced.

He divorced his first wife, Jean, in 1938, citing her adultery with Loudon McNeill McLean.

In 1948, Lockhart married his second wife, Frances Mary Beck.

His diaries, published after his death, reveal that he struggled for most of his life with alcoholism.

== Death and legacy ==
Lockhart died on 27 February 1970, at the age of 82, and left property valued at £2054. His address at death was Brookside, Ditchling, Sussex.

The 1983 British television series Reilly, Ace of Spies, was based on a book by his son. Lockhart was portrayed by actor Ian Charleson in the series.

== Honours ==
- Knight Commander of the Order of St Michael and St George in 1943 New Year Honours, citing his work as Director-General, Political Warfare Executive

== Books ==
- Memoirs of a British Agent (Putnam, London, 1932); American edition: British Agent (Putnam, New York, 1933)
- Retreat from Glory (Putnam, London, 1934)
- Return to Malaya (Putnam, London, 1936)
- My Scottish Youth (Putnam, London, 1937)
- Guns or Butter: War Countries and Peace Countries of Europe Revisited (Putnam, London, 1938)
- A Son of Scotland (Putnam, London, 1938)
- Comes the Reckoning (Putnam, London, 1947)
- My Rod, My Comfort (Putnam, London, 1949)
- The Marines Were There: the Story of the Royal Marines in the Second World War (Putnam, London, 1950)
- Scotch: the Whisky of Scotland in Fact and Story (Putnam, London, 1951)
- My Europe (Putnam, London, 1952)
- What Happened to the Czechs? (Batchworth Press, London, 1953)
- Your England (Putnam, London, 1955)
- Jan Masaryk, a Personal Memoir (Putnam, London, 1956)
- Friends, Foes, and Foreigners (Putnam, London, 1957)
- The Two Revolutions: an Eyewitness Study of Russia, 1917 (Bodley Head, London, 1967)
- The Diaries of Sir Robert Bruce Lockhart. Volume One: 1915-1938 (Macmillan, London, 1973)
- The Diaries of Sir Robert Bruce Lockhart. Volume Two: 1939-1965 (Macmillan, London, 1980)
- My Scottish Youth (B&W Publishing, Edinburgh 1993)

== See also ==
- List of Scottish cricket and rugby union players
- Logie Bruce Lockhart (son of R. H. Bruce Lockhart's brother, J. H. Bruce Lockhart)
- Sandy Bruce-Lockhart, Baron Bruce-Lockhart (grandson of R. H. Bruce Lockhart's brother, J. H. Bruce Lockhart)
- Dugald Bruce Lockhart (great-great-nephew)
