= Ridley College (Ontario) =

Coordinates: 43.1525°N 79.2570°W

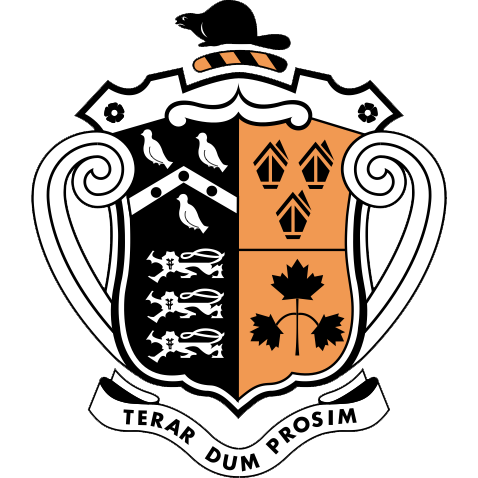
- Coat of arms of Ridley College

Location
- 2 Ridley Road; St. Catharines, Ontario, L2R 7C3; Canada

Information
- School type: Independent boarding and day University-preparatory
- Motto: Terar dum prosim (Latin for 'May I be consumed in service')
- Religious affiliation: Anglican
- Established: 1889; 137 years ago
- Oversight: Ridley College Board of Governors
- President: Suzanne Court
- Headmaster: Ed Kidd
- Faculty: 111
- Grades: K–12
- Enrollment: 764 (from 55 countries)
- Average class size: 17 students
- Student to teacher ratio: 8:1
- Language: English, French
- Campus: 108 acres
- Houses: 10
- Colours: Orange and Black
- Mascot: Hank
- Nickname: Tigers
- Newspaper: Tiger Tribune; Hank Magazine
- Yearbook: ACTA Ridleiana
- Alumni: Old Ridleians
- School song: Come fill your glasses up
- Website: ridleycollege.com

Ridley College (also known as RC, Ridley) is a private boarding and day university-preparatory school located in St. Catharines, Ontario, Canada, 20 miles (32 km) from Niagara Falls. The school confers the Ontario Secondary School Diploma and the International Baccalaureate diploma programme. Ridley is one of the oldest private schools in Canada, and has the largest boarding program in Ontario, with students representing over 55 countries.

Established as an Anglican-affiliated all-boys school in 1889, Ridley became coeducational in 1973. The school is divided into ten houses, each of which serves as a residence and community for its students. All students take part in an extensive extracurricular program including sports (ranging from a beginner to varsity level), arts and theatre opportunities, student initiatives, and community service. Ridley's boarding program plays a dominant role in its curriculum, with faculty heavily involved in student life outside the classroom in roles such as housemasters, coaches, and advisors.

Ridley is a member of the Canadian Accredited Independent Schools, the Headmasters' and Headmistresses' Conference and competes in the Conference of Independent Schools of Ontario Athletic Association (CISAA) sports conference, of which it is one of four original founding schools. Ridley has an array of student clubs, many of which take part in both Canadian and international competitions. The school's overall curriculum emphasizes a balanced and disciplined combination of academics, athletics, school involvement, and community service. Ridley alumni are known as Old Ridleians, and are entitled to use the post-nominal letters "O.R."

== History ==
=== Origins ===
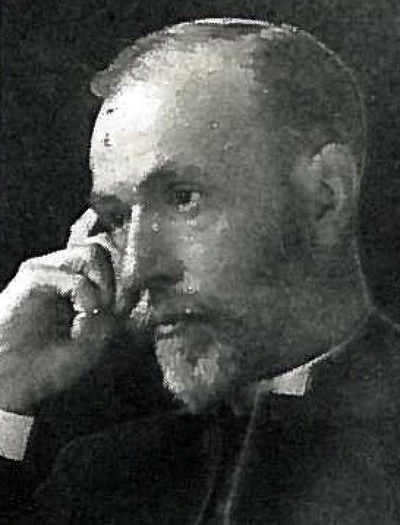
Dr. John Ormsby Miller, first headmaster of Ridley College.

Established in 1889, the school was founded by a group of Anglican clergymen seeking to provide boys in Ontario with an education that emphasized strong academic and religious values. Another founder, Thomas Rodman Merritt, served as President of the college until 1899. Named after Bishop Nicholas Ridley, a 16th-century English churchman martyred during the Protestant Reformation, the school was originally known as Bishop Ridley College.

The school's first campus, known as the Springbank campus, was integrated into the then-recently closed hotel of the same name constructed in 1864 by Dr. Theophilus Mack on Yates Street in St. Catharines. The Reverend Dr. John Ormsby Miller, a highly regarded scholar and administrator, assumed his duties at the school's conception as the first headmaster of Ridley College.

In 1891, the first Ridley College Cross Country Run was held, which would go on to become one of the longest standing traditions at Ridley. In the same year, the first edition of ACTA Ridleiana was published, which at the time served as an alumni newsletter (it would later change to being the school's yearbook).

=== Early 20th century ===
In 1903, the Springbank campus was destroyed as a result of a fire, resulting in the founders seeking a new site to restore it. The school was rebuilt at the site of its current campus, where the previous students of the Springbank campus would go to play sports. The address and street name of which soon became known as Ridley Road. The cornerstone of the Upper School building was laid in 1904, and the first dormitory, Dean's House, was built in 1907. Dr. Miller's 30-year tenure as headmaster would establish the foundations of the school. The oldest building remaining on campus is the cricket shed, which was already built as sports equipment storage for the students of the Springbank campus.

In 1907, the Ridley College Cadet Corps was officially recognized as Unit No. 162. The Corps was brought about by Colonel Thairs and Headmaster Miller. The first Inspection was held in 1908 with 40 cadets and in 1912, the Cadet Band was added. In 1917, the first Lower School Cross Country Run was held.

=== Post-World War I ===
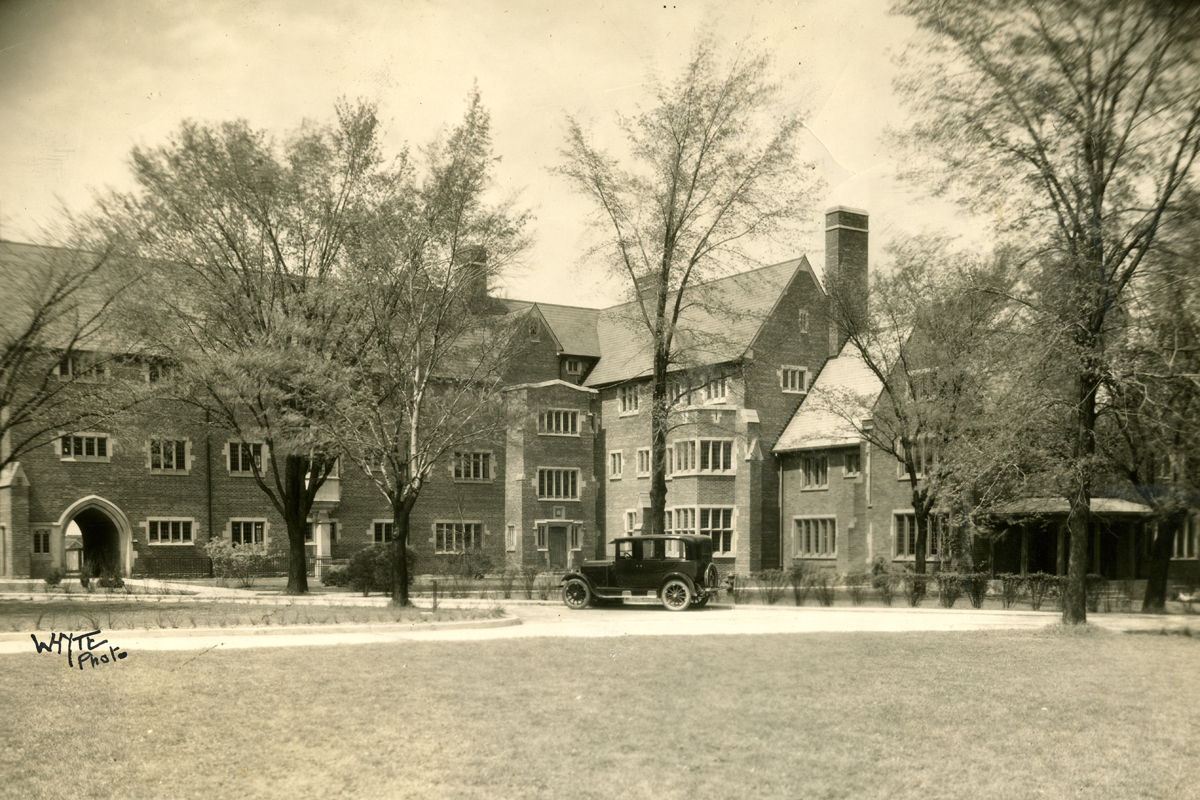
Gooderham House at Ridley College in the 1920s.

The school experienced rapid growth and expansion (both population and campus-wise) in the first half of the twentieth century, including the building of Ridley College Chapel and Dormitory Building by architects Sproatt and Rolph. The Memorial Chapel and two marble plaques were built by architects Sproatt and Rolph in 1921 to commemorate the sixty-one Old Ridleians who lost their lives in World War I. In the same year, Dr. Harry Griffith became the second headmaster of Ridley. In 1922, Gooderham House, donated by the Gooderham family, was opened. The Lower School opened in 1927 with a total of eighty students (sixty boarders, nineteen day boys and one day girl). It also became home to two Upper School dormitories, Mandeville House and Leonard House.

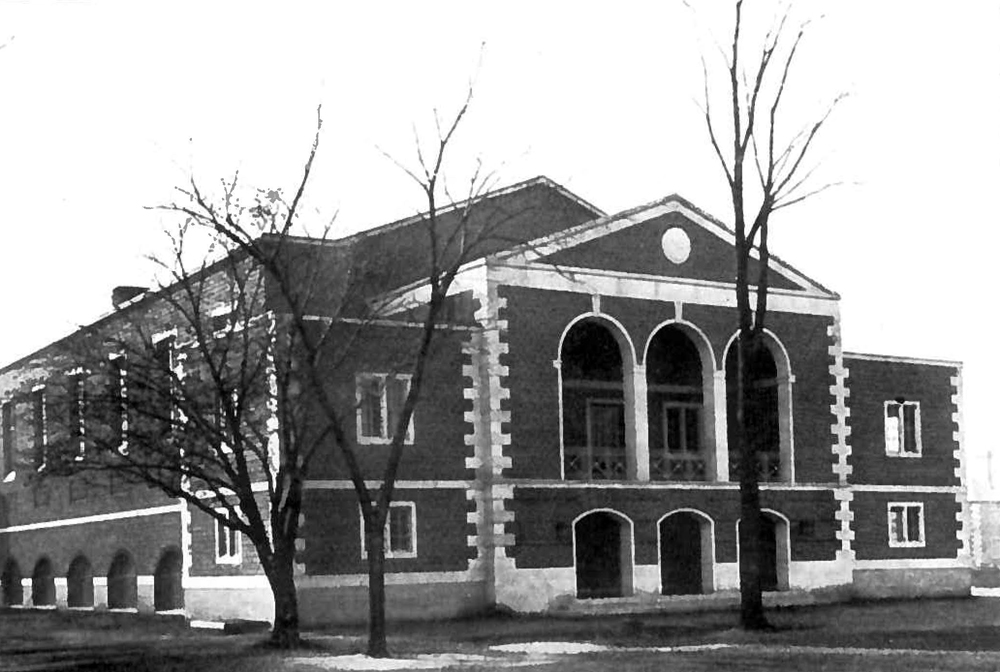
The Iggulden Gym at Ridley College in the 1940s.

A new dormitory, Merritt House, was built by architects Sproatt and Rolph during the Great Depression and, despite financial constraints, was opened in 1932. It was named after Thomas Rodman Merritt, Ridley's first president. In 1934, the Marriott Gates marking the entrance of the school were erected. A new gym was opened in 1939, which would later be named the Iggulden Gym. The gym accommodated swimming, squash, basketball, gymnastics, boxing and fencing, and was also home to a new stage for dramatic arts.

=== Post-World War II ===
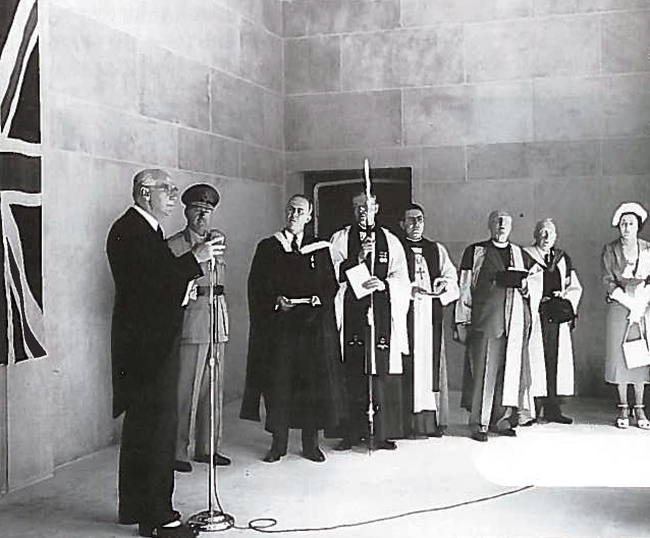
The Memorial Great Hall at Ridley College was opened in 1950 and dedicated to alumni who lost their lives in World War II.

The Schmon Infirmary and the Memorial Great Hall were built in 1949, and in that year Dr. J. R. Hamilton became the third headmaster of Ridley. Hamilton was a Science teacher and housemaster prior to becoming Headmaster in 1949. Hamilton emphasized the importance of Ridleians understanding the world around them and established periods for discussions on current affairs and debate.

The Memorial Great Hall and its accompanying List of Honour plaque were dedicated in 1950 to Old Ridleians who died serving in World War II. The first issue of the Ridley Tiger was also published that year. It became the school's alumni newsletter, and ACTA Ridleiana became the school's yearbook.

In 1962, Mr. Ted Pilgrim became the fourth headmaster of Ridley. A gradual increase in overall enrolment had taken place in the late 50s and 60s, leading to the building of Arthur Bishop House in 1965. The residence accommodated seventy-four boys and was named after Ridley's sixth president, Arthur Leonard Bishop. The Memorial Chapel was expanded in the 1960s to accommodate increased enrolment.

In 1971, Mr. Richard Bradley became the fifth headmaster of Ridley. In September 1973, Ridley became co-educational, and eleven girls were enrolled and assigned to the first floor of Dean's House (which has since reverted to a boys' residence, given that several separate girls' residences were built). Also in 1973, the McLaughlin building was built, which was named after Col. Robert Samuel McLaughlin, who pledged CAN$900,000 from the McLaughlin Foundation. The building housed fifteen new classrooms, the new Matthews Library, a new art room, and a new biology laboratory. Today, the building is still home to the Matthews Library and classrooms. In September 1978, girls began boarding. Also that year, the Griffith Arena was opened.

In 1981, Dr. Jeremy Packard became the sixth headmaster of Ridley. In 1981, the National Film Board of Canada released the documentary film Ridley: A Secret Garden about the School. In 1986, the first Chimes Challenge was held, a sprinting competition which remains an annual tradition. In 1989, as the school marked its 100th year, the Second Century Building was officially opened and dedicated as Ridley's primary science and arts facility. In the same year, Mr. Douglas Campbell became the seventh headmaster of Ridley.

1992 saw the official opening of the new headmaster's residence, Kenyon Lett House. In 1995, Mr. Rupert Lane became the eighth headmaster of Ridley. In 1999, the school underwent a critical transformation with the introduction of laptops to the classroom and curriculum.

=== 21st century ===
In 2000, the book Ridley: A Canadian School, by Richard Bradley (Ridley's fifth headmaster) and Paul Lewis, was published, detailing the history and traditions of the school. In 2004, Mr. Jonathan Leigh became the ninth headmaster of Ridley.

In 2010, the new Arena/Fieldhouse Complex was opened. In 2012, Mr. Edward Kidd became the tenth headmaster of Ridley, and the International Baccalaureate program was introduced to the school.

== Campus ==
=== Lower School ===
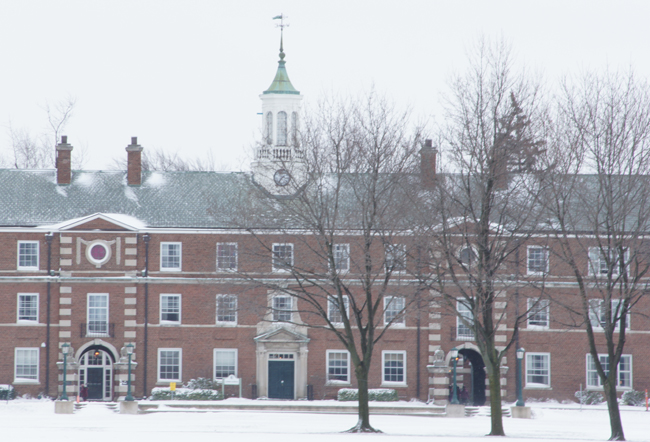
Lower School at Ridley College.

The Lower School is located across campus from the Upper School and the Memorial Chapel. The Lower School includes a split Junior and Senior Kindergarten class, one class per grade from Grades 1–6, two Grade 7 classes, and two Grade 8 classes.

There are approximately 180 students in the Lower School, of which 2% are boarding students.

=== Middle School ===
There are approximately 110 students in the Middle School, of which 24% are boarding students.

=== Upper School ===
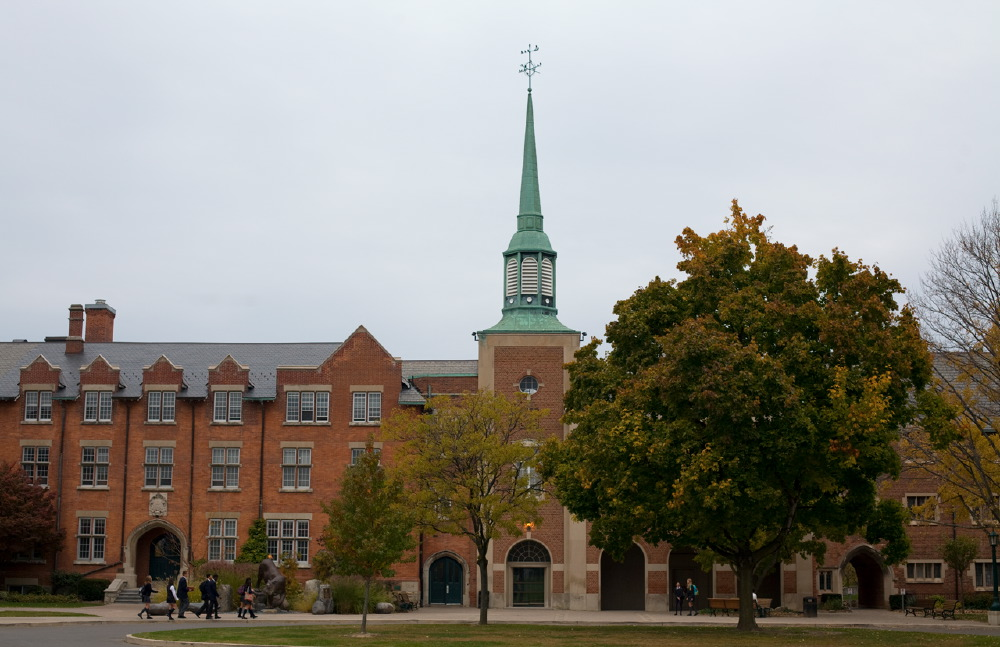
Upper School at Ridley College.

There are approximately 500 students in the Upper School, of which 66% are boarding students. The average class size is 17 students. The Upper School building, known as the School House, is considered the core of the campus. It is surrounded by the Memorial Chapel, the "front circle", the infirmary, and several dormitories. It is where the majority of the school's academic and administrative activities take place.

The ground floor (known as the "first flat") of School House includes the Memorial Great Hall where students and faculty dine, the Headmaster's office, the Matthews Library, and the History Wing in which history, economics, and other social science classes are located. There is also a direct, indoor pathway to the Memorial Chapel on this floor.

The floor above ("second flat") includes English classes and the Ross Morrow Theatre, guidance counselling offices, and the computer repair centre (known as the HelpDesk).

The top floor ("third flat") is home to mathematics classes and the school's finance and administration offices.

Finally, the basement level of School House includes The Learning Centre, the school archives, sewing room, and a campus co-op store named Hank's.

=== Second Century Building ===
The Second Century Building ("2CB") is home to the school's science, music, and performing arts facilities.

For each of the core science subjects (biology, chemistry, and physics), there is a classroom used for lectures with an accompanying lab room for applied lessons and experiments. There is a robotics lab, a design workshop, a studio art classroom, and various music rooms equipped with sound-proof walls.

Finally, the Second Century Building is home to the Mandeville Theatre, which serves as the school's primary venue for musical, drama, and speaker events.

As of the 2023-2024, the Second Century Building is the home of Ridley College's Middle School.

=== The Houses of Ridley College ===
There are currently 10 boarding houses at Ridley College, 5 boys' houses, 4 girls' houses, and 1 lower school house. Each house has a Head of House, Assistant Head of House, and Residence Don who help manage the house and act as guardians for the students in their care. Along with the staff, there are also student leaders in each of the houses. The two positions of leadership in the boarding houses are the House Captains and the Grade Representatives. House captains are all in their final year of High School. The 5 boys' houses are: Arthur Bishop West, Arthur Bishop East, Merritt North, Merritt South and Deans House. The 4 girls' houses are: Mandeville, Leonard, Gooderham East and Gooderham West. The lower school house is: Burgoyne

=== Arthur Bishop House ===
The Arthur Bishop House is a boys' dormitory on campus and is located in the Merritt Quad along with Merritt House. The Arthur Bishop House contains two houses; Arthur Bishop West and Arthur Bishop East, also known as AB-West and AB-East. AB-West's mascot is the Bandit and the house colors are Maroon and Navy. The house charity for AB-West is Community Crew. AB-East's mascot is the Beast and the house colors are Grey and Gold. The house charity for AB-East is Gillian's Place.

=== Gooderham House ===
Gooderham House is a girls' dormitory on campus that contains two houses; G-East and G-West. It is located to the right of the Upper School. G-East has the mascot of the crocodile, has the house colour of green, and supports the charity Start-Me Up Niagara. G-West has the mascot of the flamingo, has the house colour of pink, and supports the charity of Canadian Cancer Society, Run for the Cure

== Academics ==
In 2004 the school adapted to the 4-year programme of the Ontario Academic Curriculum but it continues to offer a fifth, "PG" ("post-graduate") year. Ridley is a test administration site for the SSAT, SAT, and ACT.

Ridley College is accredited to the Canadian Association of Independent Schools (CAIS) and the Canadian Educational Standards Institute (CESI) under the Ridley College Board of Governors.

== School life ==
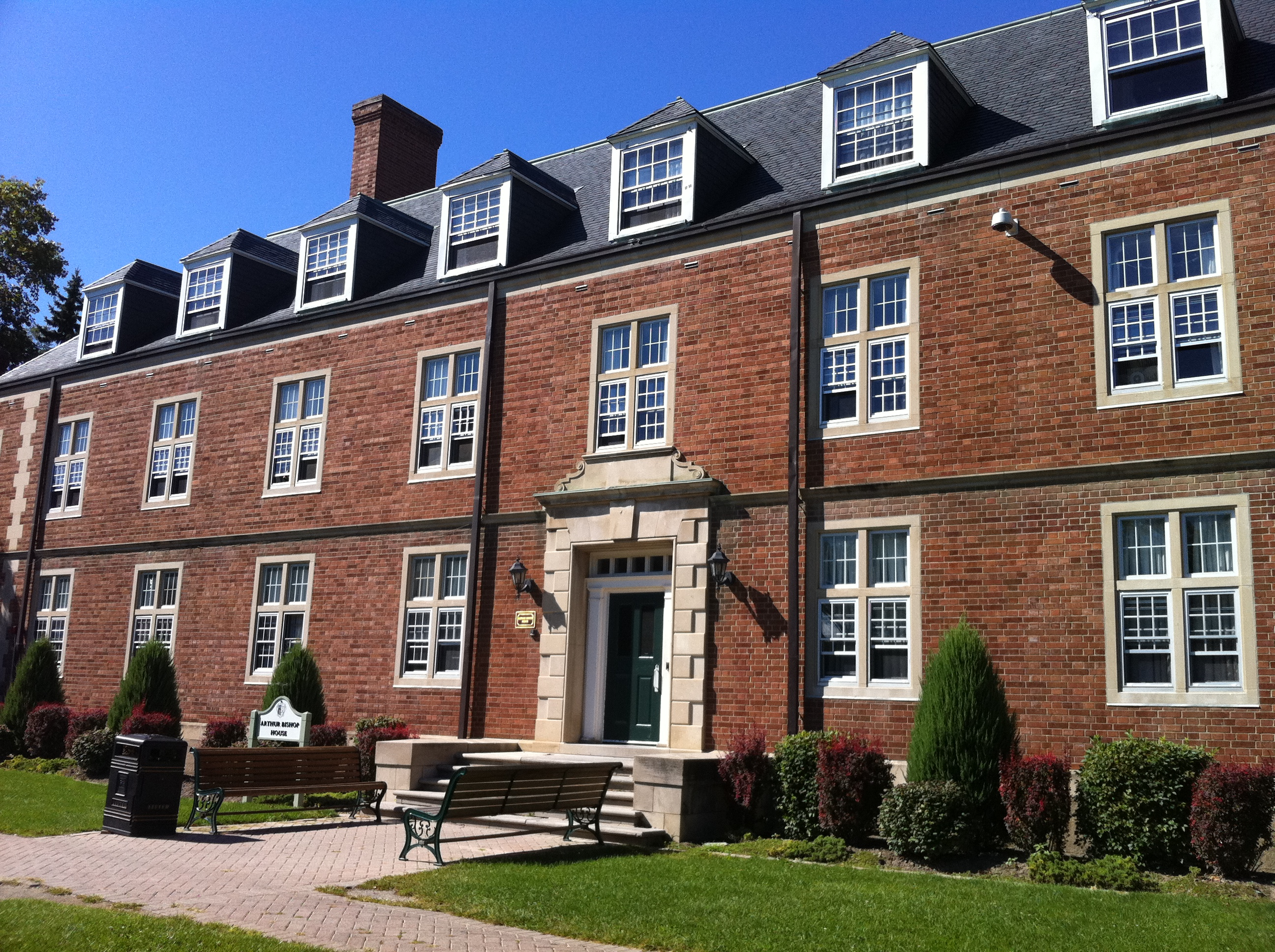
Arthur Bishop House, which includes Arthur Bishop East and West (two of the five boys' houses within Ridley College).

There is a Lower School (Junior Kindergarten to grade 8, formerly the Middle School) and an Upper School (grades 9-12 and PG).

== Cadet Corps ==
The school sponsors 62 The Ridley College Royal Canadian Army Cadets Corps and has a longstanding tradition of mandatory enrollment for its students.

== Notable alumni ==
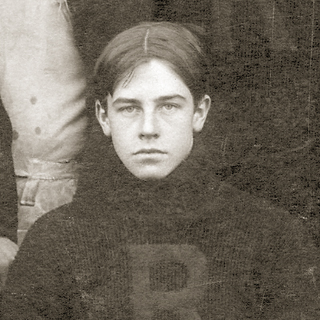
F.W. Baldwin at Ridley College, 1900

- Frederick Walker Baldwin, Aviation Engineer, first Canadian (and third North American after the Wright Brothers) to pilot an aircraft
- Lord Montagu of Beaulieu, Conservative peer and LGBT pioneer
- Richard M. Ivey CC, Canadian lawyer and philanthropist, namesake of Ivey Business School and Companion of the Order of Canada.
- Henry Allen John, 8th Earl Bathurst
- Sir John Irving Bell, Regius Professor of Medicine, Oxford University, Rhodes Scholar, Founder of the Wellcome Trust Centre for Human Genetics
- Simon Bruce-Lockhart, headmaster of Norfolk Glenlyon School and other schools
- James Coyne, Rhodes Scholar, second Governor of the Bank of Canada
- Hume Cronyn OC, descendant of the Labatt brewery family, film, television and stage actor, AMPAS ("Oscar") nominee for The Seventh Cross, Tony Award winner as Polonius opposite Richard Burton's Hamlet, appeared in Cleopatra, 12 Angry Men, The Pelican Brief. Invested Officer of the Order of Canada, 1988.
- Robert George Brian Dickson, PC, CC, CD, LL.B, LL.D, Chief Justice of Canada, Companion of the Order of Canada
- David A. Dodge, Governor of the Bank of Canada.
- Colm Feore, film and stage actor, Trudeau; Pearl Harbor; The Sum of All Fears; The Insider
- James K. Gray OC, Co-Founder, Canadian Hunter Exploration, sold to Burlington Resources for $3.4 billion, Director of Brascan Corp., Canadian National Railways, Order of Canada
- Peter Gzowski CC, journalist and author, Morningside; The Private Voice, A Journal of Reflections.
- Josie Ho, Hong Kong actress, daughter of Macau billionaire, Stanley Ho
- David L. Humphreys, biographer of Canadian former Prime Minister Joe Clark
- Ashley Leggat, stage, film, and television actress, co-lead in the sitcom Life with Derek.
- Raine Maida, lead singer of Our Lady Peace (he did not graduate from Ridley)
- Duncan Coutts, bassist of Our Lady Peace
- Darcy McKeough OC, Former CEO of Union Gas and Former Treasurer of the Province of Ontario, appointed Officer of the Order of Canada
- Colonel Thomas Fraser Ritchie DSO, soldier in the Boer War and First World War
- Michael Sabia, President and CEO, Caisse de dépôt, Quebec
- C. Ross "Sandy" Somerville named "Golfer of the half century" by the Canadian Press, 1950
- Richard B. Wright OC, former faculty member, author of 11 novels, Giller Prize, Trillium Book Prize, recipient of the Governor General's Award, appointed Officer of the Order of Canada
- Humphrey Hume Wrong, Canadian diplomat, served as Canada's Ambassador to United States, succeeding Lester B. Pearson. Notable for his early involvement in negotiating the North Atlantic Treaty Organization (NATO). Named as undersecretary to NATO, but died before taking up the post.

== List of headmasters ==
- John O. Miller (1889–1921)
- Harry C. Griffith (1921–1949)
- J. R. Hamilton (1949–1962)
- Ted Pilgrim (1962–1971)
- Richard Bradley (1971–1981)
- Jeremy Packard (1981–1989)
- Douglas Campbell (1989–1995)
- Rupert Lane (1995–2004)
- Jonathan Leigh (2004–2012)
- Edward Kidd (2012–present)

== Other notable staff ==
- Clement Melville Keys, a schoolmaster from 1899 to 1901
- Simon Bruce-Lockhart, housemaster, later head of other schools
- Edmund Burn, cricket coach, 1951 to 1969
- Dennis Hull, hockey coach

== See also ==
- Education in Ontario
- List of secondary schools in Ontario
