= Jeremy Beecham, Baron Beecham =

British Labour politician (1944–2026)

The Right Honourable The Lord Beecham DL
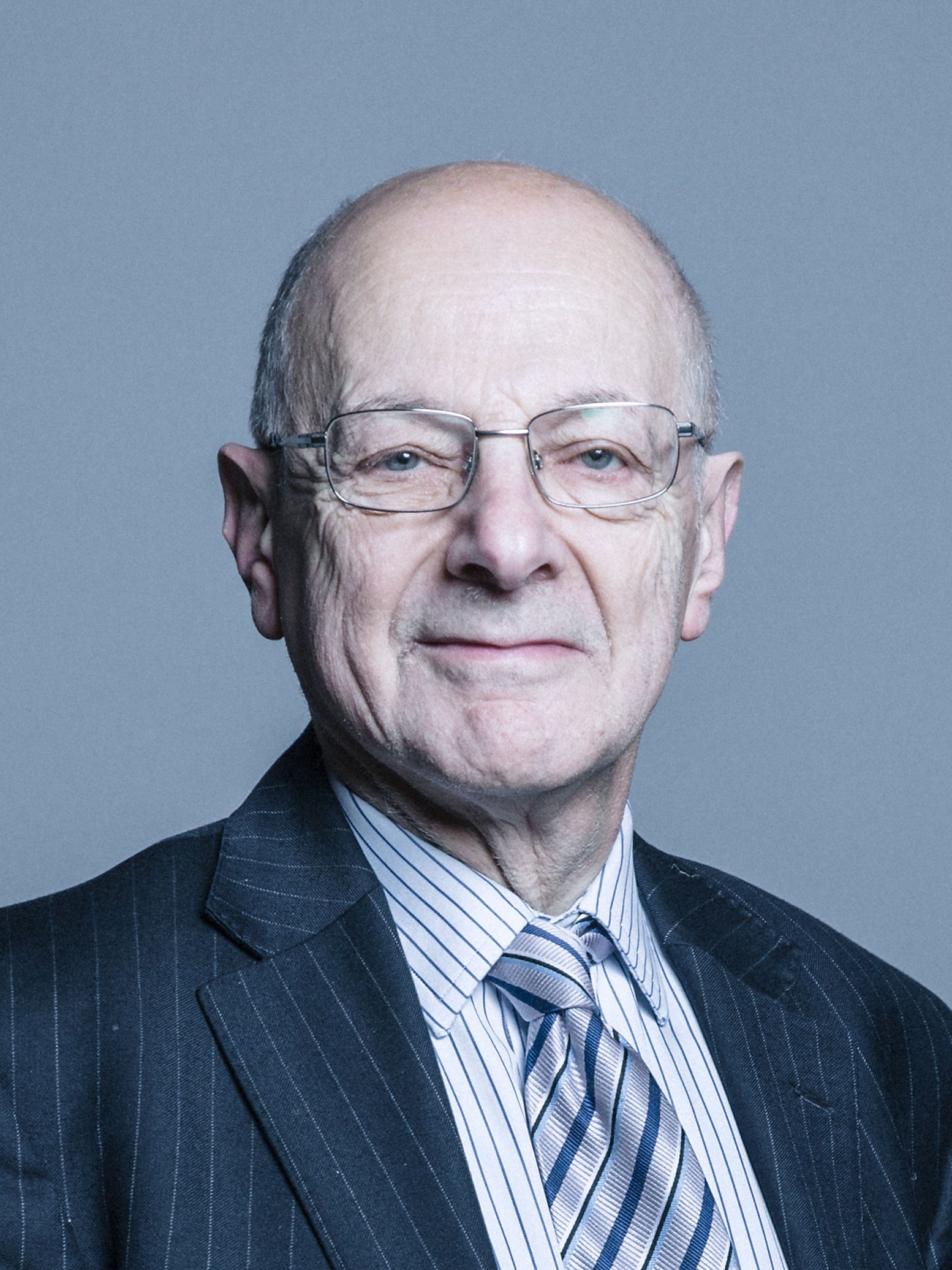

Leader of Newcastle City Council
- In office 1977–1994
- Preceded by: Tom Collins
- Succeeded by: Tony Flynn

Chairman of the Local Government Association
- In office 1997–2010
- Preceded by: Office formed

Newcastle City Councillor for Benwell and Scotswood
- In office 11 May 1967 – 2022

Member of the House of Lords
- Lord Temporal
- Life peerage 20 July 2010 – 1 September 2021

Personal details
- Born: Jeremy Hugh Beecham; 14 November 1944 Leicester, Leicestershire, England
- Died: 9 April 2026 (aged 81)
- Party: Labour

Jeremy Hugh Beecham, Baron Beecham, DL (14 November 1944 – 9 April 2026) was a British Labour politician and a senior figure in English local government. He was leader of Newcastle City Council and the first Chairman of the Local Government Association. He was the elected Chairman of the National Executive Committee of the Labour Party (October 2005 – September 2006).

== Life and career ==
Beecham was born in Leicester on 14 November 1944. The family moved to Newcastle when he was two years old. He was educated at the Royal Grammar School, Newcastle upon Tyne, and University College, Oxford (1962–1965), where he obtained a first class honours degree in law. He became a solicitor. He joined the Labour Party in 1959, and was elected a councillor for Benwell, Newcastle, in the Newcastle City Council elections of 11 May 1967.

He stood for Parliament without success in Tynemouth in 1970. He chaired the Social Services Committee on the council from 1973 to 1977 and was Leader of Newcastle from 1977 to 1994, chairing the Finance Committee from 1979 to 1984. In 1991, Beecham became Chairman of the Association of Metropolitan Authorities (AMA). When the AMA merged with the Association of District Councils and the Association of County Councils on 1 April 1997 to form the Local Government Association, he became the first chairman of the LGA. He was, as of 2006, the LGA vice-chairman and continued to chair the LGA Labour Group. He was the President of the British Urban Regeneration Association (now folded).

Beecham was a member of many boards and committees in Newcastle and North East England, and in advising government. Beecham was a member of the Labour Party National Executive Committee from 1998 and was its chairman in 2005-2006.

He became a Knight Bachelor in the 1994 Birthday Honours having the honour conferred by HM The Queen on 22 November 1994.

Beecham was made a Freeman of the city of Newcastle in 1995. He was Deputy Lieutenant for the County of Tyne and Wear and Benwell and Scotswood on the City Council. He was a council member at charity Common Purpose since 1989. He was Jewish, and a board member of the New Israel Fund in the UK.

On 20 July 2010, Beecham was created a life peer as "Baron Beecham of Benwell and Newcastle upon Tyne in the County of Tyne and Wear", and was introduced in the House of Lords on 28 July 2010. He sat on the Labour benches until his retirement in 2021.

Beecham later suffered from Alzheimer's disease. He died on 9 April 2026, at the age of 81.

Political offices
Preceded by (new post)	Chairman of the Local Government Association; 1997–2004	Succeeded by Sir Sandy Bruce-Lockhart
Preceded by Ian McCartney	Chair of the Labour Party; 2005–2006	Succeeded by Michael Griffiths
