= Edmund Burn =

Canadian cricketer

Personal information
- Full name: Edmund Holcroft Miller Burn
- Born: 6 October 1922; Brigg, Lincolnshire, England
- Died: 22 October 1969 (aged 47); Grimsby Beach, Ontario, Canada
- Batting: Right-handed
- Bowling: Right-arm medium

Domestic team information
- Years: Team
- 1954: Canada

Career statistics
Competition	First-class
Matches	2
Runs scored	31
Batting average	7.55
100s/50s	–/–
Top score	12
Balls bowled	–
Wickets	–
Bowling average	–
5 wickets in innings	–
10 wickets in match	–
Best bowling	–
Catches/stumpings	1/–
- Source: CricketArchive, 14 October 2011

Edmund Holcroft Miller Burn (6 October 1922 in Lincolnshire, England – 22 October 1969 in Grimsby Beach, Ontario, Canada) was a Canadian cricketer. He was a right-handed batsman and a right-arm off-spinner.

Burn had several roles in Canadian cricket. He served as secretary of the Ontario Cricket Association from 1954 to 1956, followed by a stint on the board of control of the Canadian Cricket Association until 1958. He also produced, edited and published the Canadian Cricketer magazine from 1952 until 1965. He was also cricket coach at Ridley College from 1951 until his death in 1969, gaining a reputation as one of the finest coaches in the country.

He also had a playing career, representing both Ontario and Manitoba in inter-provincial competition in addition to playing for the Canadian national team, including two first-class matches on their 1954 tour of England, the highlight of which was an innings of 48 against the MCC at Lord's. He died in a road accident at Grimsby Beach, Ontario along with his wife Constance ("Connie") in 1969, aged 47. Edmund was survived by his son Peter and daughter Trish.
