= David L. Humphreys =

Canadian journalist and lobbyist (born 1939)

David L. Humphreys (born 1939 in Kingston, Ontario) is a Canadian journalist, writer, lobbyist, and consultant.

== Biography ==
Following his birth in Kingston, Ontario, Humphreys and his family moved to Alberta. He was educated at Ridley College in St. Catharines, Ontario, and at St. John's College in Winnipeg. He graduated from the University of Manitoba with a Bachelor of Arts degree in 1960, and edited the campus paper The Manitoban in 1959–1960.

Humphreys began his career in journalism with the Edmonton Journal in 1957, where he met and befriended future Prime Minister Joe Clark, who was then a student at the University of Alberta and a summer student with the newspaper. He later moved to the Winnipeg Tribune as a reporter and later wire editor. Humphreys was appointed as news editor for The Albertan in Calgary in 1964, and became managing editor there in 1966. He moved to London, England in 1969 to take a position as European correspondent for FP Publications. After four years in London he was appointed managing editor of the Ottawa Journal where he served until 1978 when he was appointed Ottawa bureau chief for The Globe and Mail.

Humphreys wrote a 1978 biography of Joe Clark entitled Joe Clark: A Portrait. The book appeared in both hardback and softcover editions, and remains the only significant biography of Clark, who became Canadian prime minister in 1979.

Humphreys then worked as an executive assistant to the minister of Indian and Northern Affairs in the Clark government. In 1983, he founded the Humphreys Public Affairs Group Inc., in Ottawa, which has specialized in housing and real estate issues. The firm has served both Canadian and multinational companies, as well as public sector organizations. Humphreys served on the board of the Michener Awards Foundation for 20 years, and as president from 2005 to 2010. Former Governor General David Johnston presented him with the Michener-Baxter Special Award for lifetime achievement in journalism.
