= Mulgrave School =

Location
- 2330 Cypress Bowl Ln; West Vancouver, British Columbia, V7S 3H9; Canada
- 49.349637°N 123.1975708°W

Information
- Funding type: Private
- Founded: 1993
- Head of School: Craig Davis
- Grades: PK-12
- Language: English
- Campus: Suburban
- Mascot: Tron
- Team name: Mulgrave Titans
- Website: www.mulgrave.com

Mulgrave School is an independent non-denominational, co-educational, university-preparatory school in West Vancouver, Canada. It has approximately 80 students in every grade and uses all IB programs. The school is located on the side of the Cypress Group mountain range and off Exit 8 of Highway 1. The Head of School is Craig Davis, who joined in August 2023.

== History ==
=== Early days (1993–1999) ===
In 1993, the parents of West Vancouver Montessori established a school for preschool and kindergarten in a small portable on the West Vancouver Montessori School campus. As the board of directors searched for a suitable permanent site to build on, the school was moved into the North Shore Winter Club in 1995. In 1999, construction was started on the new building lot just up from exit eight of the upper levels highway. The 30 million dollar school was designed for 600 students and consisted of a theatre, library, double gym and science wing.

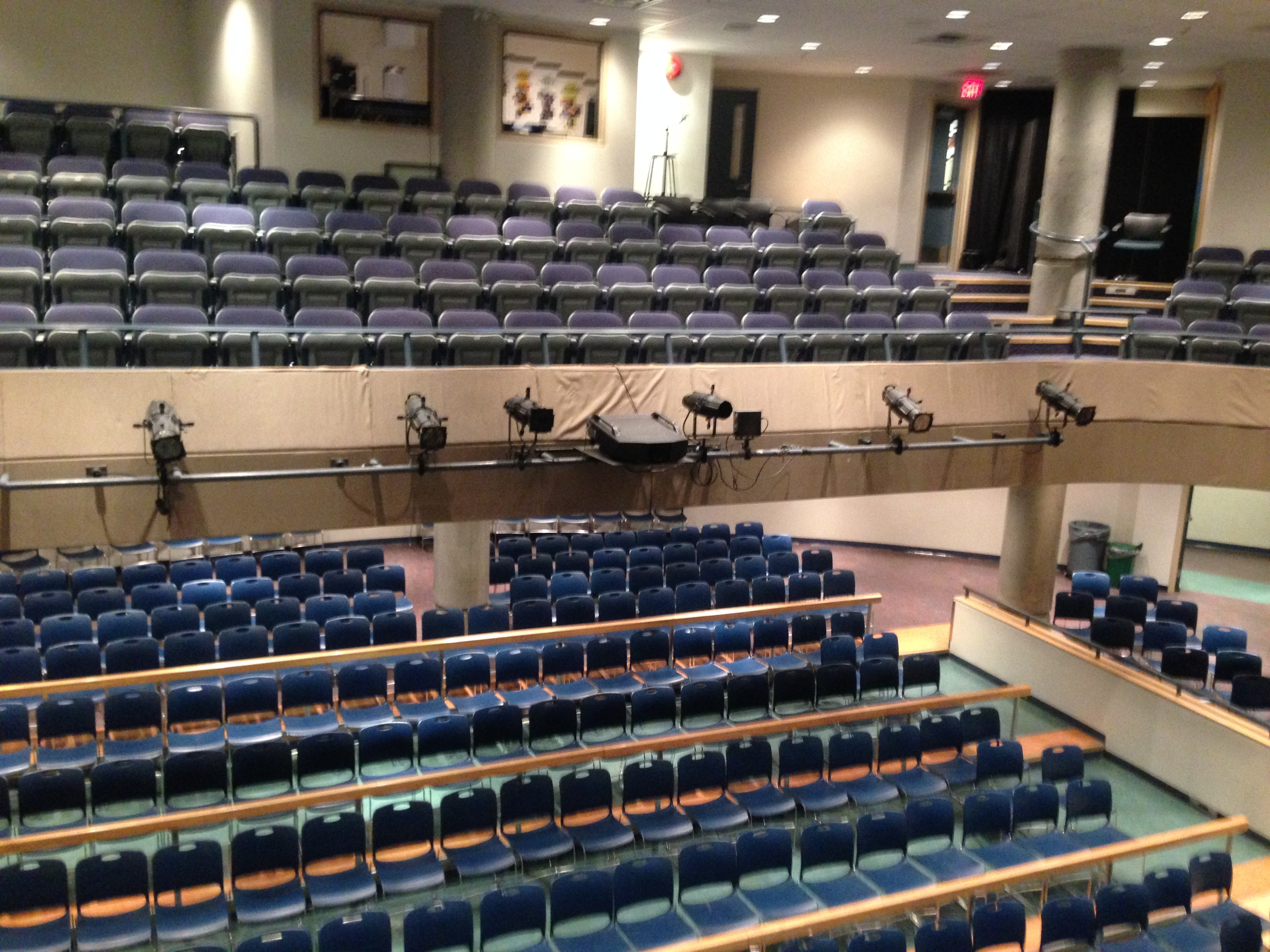
Mulgrave School's theatre.

=== Senior school expansion (2012–2015) ===
As the school's population of students expanded to over 900 The school quickly needed a new wing. Having already constructed a senior school annex, an expansion plan was approved in 2012 and the construction started in June. The new 25 million dollar facility had a new 45000 square foot senior school, a rooftop garden, cafeteria, lobby and underground parking. The total capital campaign was $30 million.

== International Baccalaureate programme ==
Mulgrave offers the International Baccalaureate programme (IB), including the primary years programme (PYP), middle years programme (MYP), and the diploma programme (DP). PYP runs from ages 3–12 or up to grade 5, MYP from ages 12–16 or up to grade 10 and the DP program from ages 16–19 or grade 11 to 12.

== Facilities ==
Mulgrave facilities Include:

- 500-seat theatre
- Library
- Cafeteria
- Science Labs (with gas lines)
- Art Department
- Design Studio
- Film Studio
- High Performance Gyms
- Sports Field

== Notable people ==
=== Alumni ===
- Matthew Durrans, professional soccer player

=== Faculty ===
- Simon Bruce-Lockhart, former Head of School
- Cassius Khan, former music instructor
