= Eagle House School =

Wellington College Prep
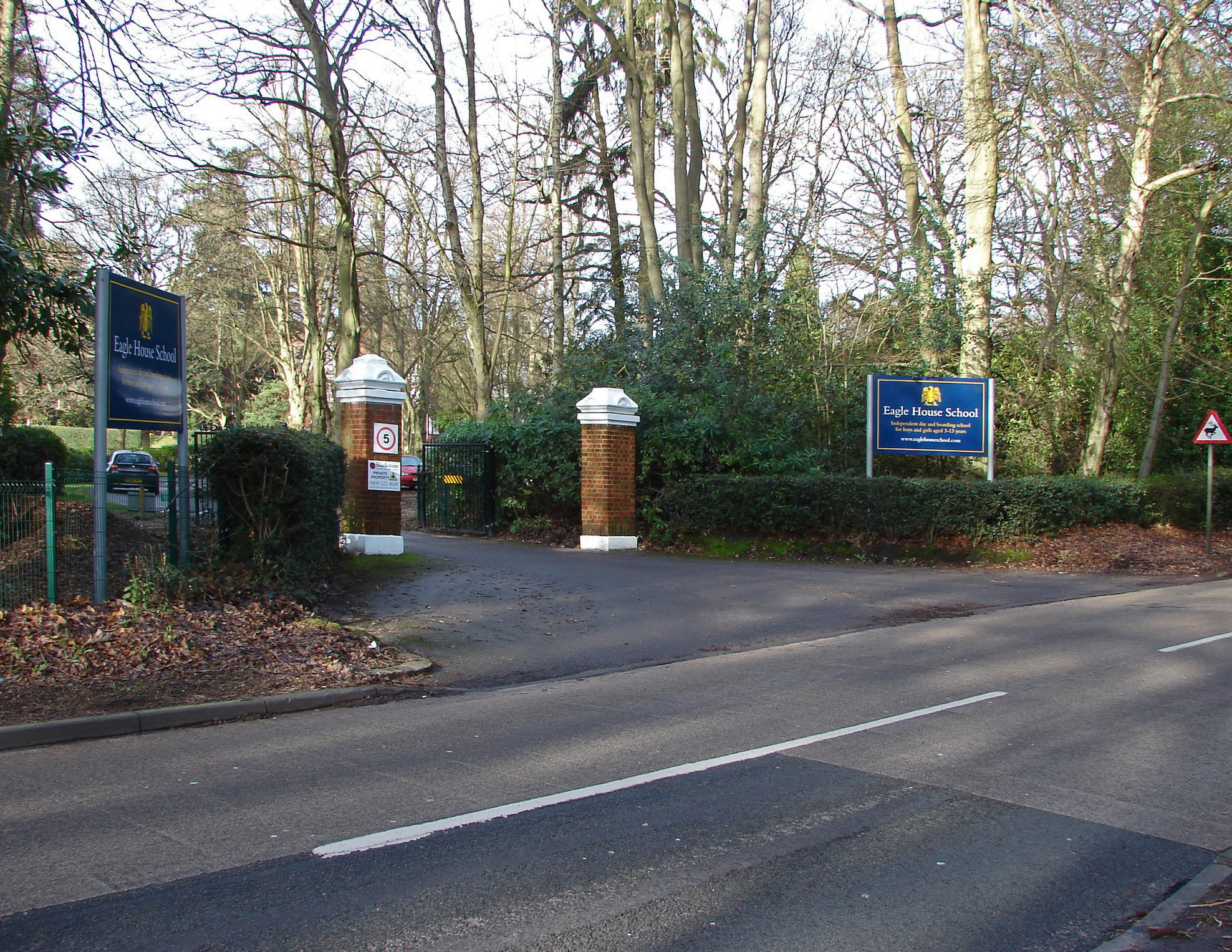
- Entrance to Wellington College Prep

Location
- Crowthorne Road; Sandhurst, Berkshire, GU47 8PH; England
- 51°21′22″N 0°48′02″W

Information
- Type: Preparatory day and boarding
- Motto: Sublimiora Petamus (Aiming High) / Learning For Life
- Religious affiliation: Church of England
- Established: 1820; 206 years ago
- Founder: Joseph Railton
- Local authority: Bracknell Forest
- Department for Education URN: 110133 Tables
- Head: Ed Venables
- Gender: Coeducational
- Age: 3 to 13
- Enrolment: 418 (2018)
- Houses: Senior - Ospreys, Merlins, Kites and Harriers.
- Colours: Navy, Light blue, Orange, Yellow
- Website: https://www.wellingtoncollegeprep.org.uk/

Wellington College Prep (formerly Eagle House School) is a 3–13 co–educational preparatory school near Sandhurst in Berkshire, England. Founded in 1820, it originally only admitted boys, keeping them "until they went out into the world", however, as of 2000, it admits both boys and girls. It is one of the country's oldest preparatory schools. In September 2024, it changed its name to Wellington College Prep to reflect the close links it has with Wellington College.

== History ==
Wellington College Prep was founded as Eagle House School in 1820 at Brook Green, Hammersmith. In 1860 it moved to a house named Brackenbury's at Wimbledon, then in 1886, after a major fire, moved to its present home at Sandhurst. In 1930 a severe outbreak of chicken-pox and measles reduced the school's numbers from twenty-nine to five, but the school soon recovered. The school was purchased by Wellington College in 1968 and shares most of its governors.

Between 1957 and 1962 Nick Drake, later a singer-songwriter, attended the school and became head boy. He was taught French at the school by John Watson, who while still at Eagle House came second in the Eurovision Song Contest 1960 with his song "Looking High, High, High".

Lieutenant-General Sir John Cowley chaired the school's Governing Body from 1968 to 1976.

== Present day ==
Originally for boys only, Wellington College Prep now caters for boys and girls between the ages of two and thirteen. It is in the same ownership as Wellington College, forming part of the same registered charitable organization. A majority of pupils continue their secondary education at the college. Before the college became fully coeducational in 2005, most girls left at age 11 for secondary school.

== Headmasters ==
- 1820: Joseph Railton
- 1833: Edward Wickham
- 1858: Edward Huntingford
- 1874: Arthur Malan
- 1906: Robert Bruce-Lockhart
- 1928: Arnold Jones
- 1929: John Parmiter
- 1939: Paul Wooton
- 1968: Michael Haggard
- 1974: John Greenish
- 1988: Simon Carder
- 2003: Andrew Barnard
- 2023: Ed Venables

== Notable former pupils ==
- Field Marshal Sir Claude John Eyre Auchinleck, soldier
- Stuart Burge, actor and director
- James Chalmers, actor
- Nick Drake, singer-songwriter
- John Gardner, composer
- Lewis Moody, rugby player
- Ellie Bamber, actor
- John Bruce Lockhart, schoolmaster and cricketer
- Ed Stewart, British radio presenter
- James Mountbatten-Windsor, Earl of Wessex, son of The Duke of Edinburgh and grandson of Queen Elizabeth II
