= Reilly, Ace of Spies =

1983 British TV drama series

- Sam Neill portraying Sidney Reilly in the television serial Reilly, Ace of Spies (1983).
- Based on: Ace of Spies by Robin Bruce Lockhart
- Screenplay by: Troy Kennedy Martin
- Directed by: Martin Campbell; Jim Goddard
- Starring: Sam Neill; Jeananne Crowley; Leo McKern; Tom Bell; Kenneth Cranham; Norman Rodway
- Theme music composer: Harry Rabinowitz; Dmitri Shostakovich (main theme)
- Country of origin: United Kingdom
- Original language: English
- No. of series: 1
- No. of episodes: 12

Production
- Producers: Chris Burt; Johnny Goodman; Verity Lambert
- Running time: 50 minutes
- Production company: Euston Films for Thames

Original release
- Network: ITV
- Release: 5 September – 16 November 1983

Reilly, Ace of Spies is a 1983 British television programme dramatising the life of Sidney Reilly, a Russian-born adventurer who became one of the greatest spies ever to work for the United Kingdom and the British Empire. Among his exploits, in the early 20th century, were the infiltration of the German General Staff in 1917 and a near-overthrow of the Bolsheviks in 1918. His reputation with women was as legendary as his genius for espionage.

The series was written by Troy Kennedy Martin, and based on the 1967 book Ace of Spies by Robin Bruce Lockhart, whose father R. H. Bruce Lockhart was one of Reilly's fellow spies. Sam Neill played the eponymous character. The theme music is the romance movement from Dmitri Shostakovich's The Gadfly Suite, though Shostakovich is not actually credited (Harry Rabinowitz is credited with the music).

== Episodes ==
There are 12 episodes, each approximately 50 minutes in length, except Episode 1, which is approximately 80 minutes. The DVD set (Thames/Fremantle) includes a 22-minute "documentary examination into what really happened".

No.	Title	Directed by	Written by	Original release date
1	"An Affair with a Married Woman"	Jim Goddard	Troy Kennedy Martin	5 September 1983
1901: Bearing top secret Russian oil industry surveys, "Professor" Sigmund Rosenblum is taken from a train and held under house arrest in Baku, Russian Empire. Margaret Thomas, the unhappy young wife of an elderly British clergyman, assists with Rosenblum's escape into the Caucasus, but suffers 18 months imprisonment for her efforts. After they meet again in London and reconcile, she becomes a wealthy widow and they marry. Rosenblum, enraged at the clumsy murder of his prostitute-mistress, falls afoul of the notorious arms-merchant Basil Zaharoff, but the two come to an accommodation. Rosenblum now becomes "Sidney Reilly" (one of a series of aliases) and at the behest of Captain Sir Mansfield Smith-Cumming, the British intelligence chief (known as "C"), he and Margaret embark together on a new espionage mission in the Far East.
2	"Prelude to War"	Martin Campbell	Troy Kennedy Martin	7 September 1983
1904: Reilly — now stationed in Port Arthur, China, under cover as a shipping agent and living with a still unhappy Margaret — reluctantly assists the Japanese Empire with its surprise attack on the Russian Pacific Fleet; it is the opening salvo of the Russo-Japanese War. General Stoessel, the obtuse Russian garrison commander, refuses to believe an attack is imminent, but wants Reilly shot promptly as a spy if one does occur. After Reilly secures safe passage for the unfaithful Margaret, he is arrested by a soft-spoken Chinese police detective who endeavours to accommodate Stoessel's execution orders, but Reilly again escapes amid the mayhem.
3	"The Visiting Fireman"	Martin Campbell	Troy Kennedy Martin	14 September 1983
1905: In Hamburg, Germany, after one British spy is killed and while another is being compromised, Reilly poses as a newly arrived welder and fireman at a Blohm and Voss armaments factory. Seducing his landlord's daughter, Reilly coldly shuts out his fellow agent and roommate, an attitude which results in his eventual suicide, but manages to secure the plans for a new naval gun that both "C" and Zaharov covet. Yet again, Reilly narrowly escapes just in time and in style, leaving mayhem in his wake.
4	"Anna"	Martin Campbell	Troy Kennedy Martin	21 September 1983
1906: Competition for the D'Arcy oil concession in Persia, as well as his search for the absconding Margaret, takes Reilly to Paris. The Australian oil magnate is about to sign a contract with the French, but by impersonating a Catholic priest-missionary, Reilly is able to infiltrate Baron Rothschild's private yacht at Antibes and blow up the deal, promptly securing it for the British. Reilly's half-sister Anna turns up unexpectedly back in Paris (revealing some of his tangled backstory as a Russian "Jewish bastard"), but their unwholesome reunion leaves her dead by suicide and him devastated.
5	"Dreadnoughts and Crosses"	Jim Goddard	Troy Kennedy Martin	28 September 1983
1910: Now well ensconced in high society in St Petersburg, Russia, Reilly has supposedly severed ties with British intelligence in favour of employment by German arms manufacturers. While keeping abreast of the "arms deal of the century" — the pending commission to rebuild the Tsar's navy, destroyed in Russia's late war with Japan — Reilly makes time with Nadia, unhappy wife of the influential Russian Count Massino. As British, German and American ship-builders vie for the lucrative contact, it emerges that Reilly (despite his animus against the King's man, Zaharov) is still working as an active secret agent for "C". He proposes to marry Nadia, but without benefit of divorce from Margaret, who now inconveniently arrives in town.
6	"Dreadnoughts and Doublecrosses"	Jim Goddard	Troy Kennedy Martin	5 October 1983
1910: Reilly connives to persuade Massino to facilitate approval of a contract with Germany over one with the British firm of his arch-nemesis Zaharov. He will enrich himself while double-crossing his German employers by sending factory blueprints to the British for use in the impending war that he is certain is coming. He plans to use the huge divorce settlement he has arranged with Massino and Nadia to disguise the bribe he is paying him for assistance with the contract. It emerges that Zaharov was behind Margaret's arrival in an effort to upset the scheme. It almost works, but Margaret is coerced into disappearing by means of Reilly's gruesomely convincing threat of murder.
7	"Gambit"	Jim Goddard	Troy Kennedy Martin	12 October 1983
1918: In Yaroslavl, Russia, Boris Savinkov schemes to coordinate an anticipated British incursion at Archangel. Traveling from Petrograd to Moscow, Reilly and his lawyer Grammaticoff are semi-officially tasked with maneuvering the newly (but uncertainly) triumphant Bolsheviks into re-entering the war against Germany. Lenin harshly rebuffs the "official" British overture, but Reilly's personal ambitions are far more audacious: with the connivance of his old friend Orlov (who has insinuated himself into the Cheka) and the Latvian Colonel Friede — and despite the outrage of Lockhart, the British Consul General — he plans to overthrow the new Soviet government and place himself in power. The assassination of the German Ambassador and a Left Socialist Revolutionary uprising, which Lenin and the ruthless Felix Dzerzhinsky manage to put down, complicate matters considerably.
8	"Endgame"	Jim Goddard	Troy Kennedy Martin	19 October 1983
1918: Reilly's planned coup is delayed when Dzerzhinsky convinces Lenin to postpone a critical meeting of the All-Russian Congress of Soviets by 10 days. The feeble British invasion of the north leaves Savinkov desperate and bitter, but even more serious is Fanya "Fanny" Kaplan's nearly successful attempt to kill Lenin. Lockhart, Friede, Friede's sister Marie and many others are arrested in a general dragnet to roll up counter-revolutionaries. This forces Reilly and Grammaticoff to flee Moscow in favor of Petrograd where they again barely escape a Bolshevik assault on the British Consul with a suitcase filled with cash. Now on the lam, the "Ace of Spies" seems to have met with a definitive failure.
9	"After Moscow"	Martin Campbell	Troy Kennedy Martin	26 October 1983
1918: Lenin recovers from his wounds, but 900 of his enemies die in the wake of the attempted assassination. Now safely back in London, Lockhart and Reilly face questioning from an official board of inquiry while in Moscow the Revolutionary Tribunal sentences both to death in absentia. With the advent of Armistice Day, Reilly keeps his hand in affairs by arranging a $250 million loan to the Bolsheviks, while simultaneously managing to fend off (lethally) their assassin. Among his romantic dalliances are a prostitute known as "the Plugger" (for her firearms expertise) and Caryll Houselander, a young Roman Catholic artist and psychic (who prophesies his future violent death in Russia). Reilly now resolves to leave the secret service and — with money salvaged from his late, failed coup operation — join forces with Savinkov and other anti-Bolsheviks in exile.
10	"The Trust"	Martin Campbell	Troy Kennedy Martin	2 November 1983
1924: In Moscow, a fake anti-Bolshevik resistance organization — "The Trust" — is in reality Dzerzhinsky's new counterintelligence program; their main objective: to lure Reilly, and especially Savinkov, back into their clutches. In New York City, Reilly's primary target is Henry Ford's financial largesse. Various Russian émigrés of dubious loyalty meet their violent demise along the way. In Berlin, Reilly encounters yet another love interest, the mysterious Pepita Bobadilla. In London, a letter from the Bolsheviks purporting to incite British communists to engage in seditious activities is intercepted by "C" who is enraged since the document is an apparent forgery instigated by Reilly. Despite best efforts, the letter is released to the press resulting in a scandal that changes the national government in the October 1924 election. Meanwhile, Savinkov has taken the bait and returned to (a post-Lenin) Russia where he has been duly tried, convicted and sentenced to death.
11	"The Last Journey"	Jim Goddard	Troy Kennedy Martin	9 November 1983
1925: Savinkov's dubious "suicide" in custody infuriates Reilly who still finds time to marry Pepita in London before travelling back through "The Window" to Petrograd to meet secretly and in person with "The Trust". There he exhorts the conspirators to establish their credibility with Western supporters by accelerating subversion in Soviet Russia including "the odd piece of terrorism". Paranoid and resentful, Stalin is alarmed to learn for the first time of Dzerzhinsky’s fake anti-Bolshevik operation and insists it be shut down immediately and Reilly arrested. Dzerzhinsky implores him not to destroy "the most successful counterespionage operation ever run", but Stalin remains adamant and Reilly is apprehended before he can slink back out of the country — an outcome he had evidently expected all along. A fake communiqué regarding the "death of an Englishman" in a Finnish border skirmish with smugglers is duly dispatched.
12	"Shutdown"	Martin Campbell	Troy Kennedy Martin	16 November 1983
1925: With Reilly imprisoned in Moscow, Bolshevik agents raid his and Pepita's apartments in Paris and London. Dzerzhinsky interrogates Reilly and has him brutally tortured, but to little effect. Russian disinformation puts it about that Reilly is dead, but "C" doubts it. In frustration, Pepita mounts her own disinformation campaign by posting her husband's obituary which has the intended effect of ruffling feathers everywhere. "C" would like to negotiate for Reilly's release, but Prime Minister Baldwin demurs. The Trust has now finally been exposed as a false flag with its agents rolled up worldwide. Dzerzhinsky would like to keep Reilly alive as an intelligence asset, but ultimately loses his battle of wills with Stalin. Reilly is executed by sniper shot in a vast snowy field. Caryll Houselander, who has mystically shared Reilly's sufferings and death, confirms his demise to Pepita.

== Cast ==
- Sam Neill as Sidney Reilly
- Peter Egan as Major Charles Fothergill
- Ian Charleson as R. H. Bruce Lockhart
- Norman Rodway as Captain Mansfield Smith-Cumming
- Tom Bell as Felix Dzerzhinsky
- David Burke as Joseph Stalin
- Kenneth Cranham as Vladimir Lenin
- Leo McKern as Basil Zaharoff
- Jeananne Crowley as Margaret Callaghan Reilly (wife #1)
- Hugh Fraser as Captain George Hill
- Derek Newark as General Stoessel
- Donald Morley as Stanley Baldwin
- John Castle as Count Massino
- Celia Gregory as Nadina "Nadia" Massino (wife #2)
- Brian Protheroe as Shasha Grammaticoff
- Joanne Whalley as Ulla Glass
- Clive Merrison as Boris Savinkov
- Laura Davenport as Nelly "Pepita" Burton (wife #3)
- Joanne Pearce as Caryll Houselander
- Michael Aldridge as Orlov
- Victoria Harwood as Natalia
- Anthony Higgins as Mikhail Trilisser
- John Rhys-Davies as Tanyatos
- Sebastian Shaw as Reverend Thomas
- Bill Nighy as Goschen
- David Ryall as Herr Glass
- Denis Lill as William Knox D'Arcy
- David Suchet as Inspector Tsientsin
- Alex McCrindle as Captain MacDougal
- Colin Jeavons as Widdemeyer
- Alfred Molina as Yakov Blumkin
- Peter Howell as Baron Rothschild
- Lindsay Duncan as The Plugger
- Hugh Fraser as George Hill
- Malcolm Terris as Sykes
- Diana Hardcastle as Anna
- Prentis Hancock as Boris Souvarine
- Geoffrey Whitehead as Count Lubinsky
- Aubrey Morris as Mendrovovich
- Phil Smeeton as Chekist
- Michael Angelis as Artur Artuzov
- Alan Downer as Eduard Berzin
- Alan Bowerman as Lieberman
- Sara Clee as Fanya "Fanny" Kaplan

== Critical reception ==
In a 1984 review for The New York Times, John Corry wrote, "much of 'Reilly' is eminently watchable simply because it is eminently watchable." He praised the production and Sam Neill's performance and summarized "a mixed bag of pleasures, but it's worth dropping in on, if not in whole, then at least in part."

== Awards ==
Costume designer Elizabeth Waller was nominated for a 1984 British Academy Television Craft Award for best costume design for the series, and editors Edward Marnier and Ralph Sheldon won the BAFTA TV Craft award for Best Film Editor.

== Home media ==
The series was issued on Region 1 DVD by A&E Home Entertainment, under licence from THAMES International, talkbackTHAMES and FremantleMedia Ltd on 22 February 2005.

== See also ==
- Examples of Yellowface
