= Patrick Bruce Lockhart =

Patrick Bruce Lockhart (25 May 1918 — 6 August 2009) was a Scottish-born obstetrician-gynaecologist who worked in Scotland, India, England, and Canada.

He became Speaker of the Council of the Canadian Medical Association and was an emeritus professor of the Royal College of Obstetricians and Gynaecologists.

== Early life ==
Born into the Bruce Lockhart family in Wallingford, then in Berkshire, Lockhart was the third son of John Bruce Lockhart, a future headmaster of Sedbergh School, by his marriage to Mona, the daughter of Henry Brougham, another schoolmaster. His father and also two of his brothers, Rab and Logie Bruce Lockhart, played rugby union for Scotland. However, in childhood Lockhart had a tubercular knee joint, which led to long periods of living in bed. He was educated at the Edinburgh Academy from 1932 to 1936, where apart from academic work he learned the piano and violin, winning a prize for music, and represented the school at fencing. From there he studied medicine at Edinburgh University and qualified as a physician in 1940. As a student, he was a member of the Scotland fencing team.

== Career ==
After serving as a house officer at the Royal Infirmary of Edinburgh, Lockhart was posted into the Royal Army Medical Corps and went out to British India, where by the end of the Second World War he was put in charge of a military hospital at Poona.

After the end of the war, Lockhart returned to Britain and practised as a doctor in Bath. In 1953 he emigrated with his wife to Sudbury in Canada, where he worked as an obstetrician and gynaecologist and became head of obstetrics at the Sudbury General Hospital. He also had a distinguished career in the wider medical world, becoming Speaker of the Council of the Canadian Medical Association and president of the Ontario Medical Association. He was also appointed as an emeritus professor by the Royal College of Obstetricians and Gynaecologists in London, a rare honour for those working overseas.

The development of public sector national health care became a hot topic in Canada after the Saskatchewan government created a publicly funded health plan in 1961–1962. In 1962, Lockhart made the counter-proposal that the status quo should continue, but with the Ontario government funding the eight to ten per cent of the population without private health insurance. Later, as president of the Ontario Medical Association, he made it clear that many Ontario doctors disagreed with the introduction of a Medicare program and said that doctors would not strike against it, but added that if health care were nationalized as many as one in five of them might leave the province for the United States.

== Private life ==
In 1942, at Sedbergh, Lockhart married firstly Mary Campbell Seddall, and they had four children, of whom one died young. After her death in 1960 he married secondly Eve Didychuk and with her had another three children. He was a lifelong golfer and tennis player and an honorary member of the Sudbury Symphony Orchestra.
