= John Bruce Lockhart =

Scottish cricketer, rugby union player & schoolmaster

John H. Bruce Lockhart
Personal information
- Full name: John Harold Bruce Lockhart
- Born: 4 March 1889; Beith, North Ayrshire, Scotland
- Died: 4 June 1956 (aged 67)
- Batting: Right-handed
- Bowling: Leg-break/Googly

Career statistics
Competition	First-class
Matches	24
Runs scored	306
Batting average	8.74
100s/50s	0/0
Top score	42
Balls bowled	4,182
Wickets	121
Bowling average	19.98
5 wickets in innings	10
10 wickets in match	3
Best bowling	8/45
Catches/stumpings	12/0
- Source: CricketArchive
- School: Spier's School
- University: Jesus College, Cambridge
- Notable relative(s): R. H. Bruce Lockhart, brother, diplomat Rab Bruce Lockhart, son, headmaster Logie Bruce Lockhart, son, headmaster Sandy Bruce-Lockhart, grandson, politician James Bruce Lockhart, grandson, author Dugald Bruce Lockhart, great-grandson, actor

Rugby union career
- Position: Fly-half / Centre
Amateur team(s)
Years	Team	Apps	(Points)
- London Scottish
Provincial / State sides
Years	Team	Apps	(Points)
1913	Scotland Possibles	1	(0)
International career
Years	Team	Apps	(Points)
1913-20	Scotland	2	(0)

John Harold "J.H." Bruce Lockhart (4 March 1889 – 4 June 1956), known as Rufus, was a sportsman and educator, headmaster of Sedbergh School from 1937 to 1954. A member of the Bruce Lockhart family, he followed in its tradition by becoming a schoolmaster and was also an artist.

Lockhart was a Scotland international rugby union player and also played for the Scotland national cricket team.

== Early life and education ==
Lockhart was born in Beith, North Ayrshire on 4 March 1889, the son of Robert Bruce Lockhart, headmaster (and founder) of Spier's School, Beith, since 1888, by his marriage to Florence Stuart Macgregor.

In 1895 his father moved on from Spier's School to Seafield House at Broughty Ferry, a new school he founded. Lockhart senior subsequently became headmaster of Eagle House School near Sandhurst, and J. H. Bruce Lockhart was sent to Sedbergh School, where he was head of house and captain of the school's association football and cricket teams. After Sedbergh, he went on to Jesus College, Cambridge, where he read the modern languages Tripos and graduated with a second-class degree.

== Cricket career ==
=== Amateur career ===
Beginning his education at Spier's School, Lockhart was introduced to rugby union, association football and cricket.

He played cricket for Cambridge University, for whom he took over one hundred wickets. At Cambridge, he was a double Blue, for rugby union and cricket.

=== International career ===
Lockhart appeared twice for Scotland at first-class cricket level, against Ireland in 1910 and an All India side in 1911. In the match against Ireland he took eleven wickets, including six for 76 in the second innings.

== Rugby Union career ==
Lockart's career in rugby union was in the days when it was an entirely amateur sport: unlike rugby league, the game could not be played professionally.

After his university days, Lockhart played for London Scottish. At the provincial level, he played once for Scotland Possibles on 18 January 1913, during the 1912–13 Scottish Districts season. He went on to become an international, representing Scotland as a fly half.

== Teaching career ==
Lockhart became an assistant master at Rugby School in 1912. After the war, he returned to his teaching career at Rugby and became a housemaster there in 1923. In 1930 he was appointed as Headmaster of Cargilfield Preparatory School, and in 1937 moved on to become head of his old school, Sedbergh, where he remained until he retired in 1954.

== Military career ==
During the First World War, he served in France in the Intelligence Corps with the British Expeditionary Force and was mentioned in despatches.

== Family ==
In 1913, J. H. Bruce Lockhart married (Alwine) Mona, the daughter of Henry Brougham, formerly a schoolmaster at Wellington College, and they had four sons. These were the headmaster and intelligence officer J. M. Bruce Lockhart (1914–1995), the obstetrician Patrick Bruce Lockhart (1918–2009), and the headmasters and Scottish international rugby union players Rab (1916–1990) and Logie Bruce Lockhart (1921–2020).

His son Logie played rugby union for Scotland, while his brother Robert was a footballer. He was also the grandfather of Lord Bruce-Lockhart and great-grandfather of actor Dugald Bruce Lockhart.

John Bruce Lockhart was an accomplished amateur artist, a member of the Lake Artists Society who exhibited at the Royal Academy, the Royal Society of Arts, and the Royal Scottish Society of Painters in Watercolour. He became a member of the Scottish Committee of the Arts Council and was a governor of Welbeck College, a member of the Council of the National Youth Orchestra of Scotland, and a Chevalier of the Légion d'honneur.

== See also ==
- List of Scottish cricket and rugby union players
