= J. M. Bruce Lockhart =

John Macgregor Bruce Lockhart OBE CMG CB (9 May 1914 – 7 May 1995) was a British schoolmaster, soldier, diplomat, intelligence officer, and university administrator.

== Life ==
Born at Rugby, Lockhart was one of the four sons of John Bruce Lockhart, a Scottish rugby international who was then a schoolmaster at Rugby School and later became head of Sedbergh School. Educated at Rugby School and the University of St Andrews, he captained the rugby XV of both and took a degree in Modern Languages. In 1937 he returned to his old school as an assistant master.

At the outset of the Second World War, Lockhart joined the Seaforth Highlanders and was recruited as an instructor by the Intelligence Corps, in which his father had also served. By 1941 he was a Major and was chief instructor on a course at the Intelligence training centre in Oxford. In 1942 he went out to the Middle East as a Secret Intelligence Service field officer. At the end of the war, Lockhart was posted as assistant military attaché to the British Embassy in Paris, and then in 1948 joined the Allied Control Commission in Germany, in fact taking charge of the Secret Intelligence Service network there. In 1951 he went to the British Embassy in Washington DC as First Secretary, after which from 1953 to 1965 he was officially attached to the Foreign Office in London, but in fact working for the Secret Intelligence Service again. In 1963 and 1964 he was in charge of operations in Africa, a task which he found deeply frustrating. In 1965 he left the SIS to join Warwick University, and in 1967 moved on to Courtaulds, as Head of its Central Staff Department. From 1971 to 1980, when he retired, he was Director of the Post Experience Programme at the City University Business School, and simultaneously chaired the Business Education Council from 1974 to 1980.

== Private life ==
On 14 September 1939, Lockhart married Margaret Evelyn Hone, a daughter of Campbell Hone, Bishop of Wakefield, and Emily Maude Weaver, and they had two sons and a daughter.

Lockhart's children were James Robert Bruce Lockhart (1941–2018), Alexander John (Sandy) Bruce-Lockhart, Baron Bruce-Lockhart (1942–2008), and Sarah Katharine Bruce Lockhart (born 1955). His elder son was the father of Dugald Bruce Lockhart (born 1968), an actor.

He died on 7 May 1995.

== Honours ==
- Officer of the Order of the British Empire, 1944
- Companion of the Order of St Michael and St George, 1951
- Companion of the Order of the Bath, 1966
