= Albert College (Belleville, Ontario) =

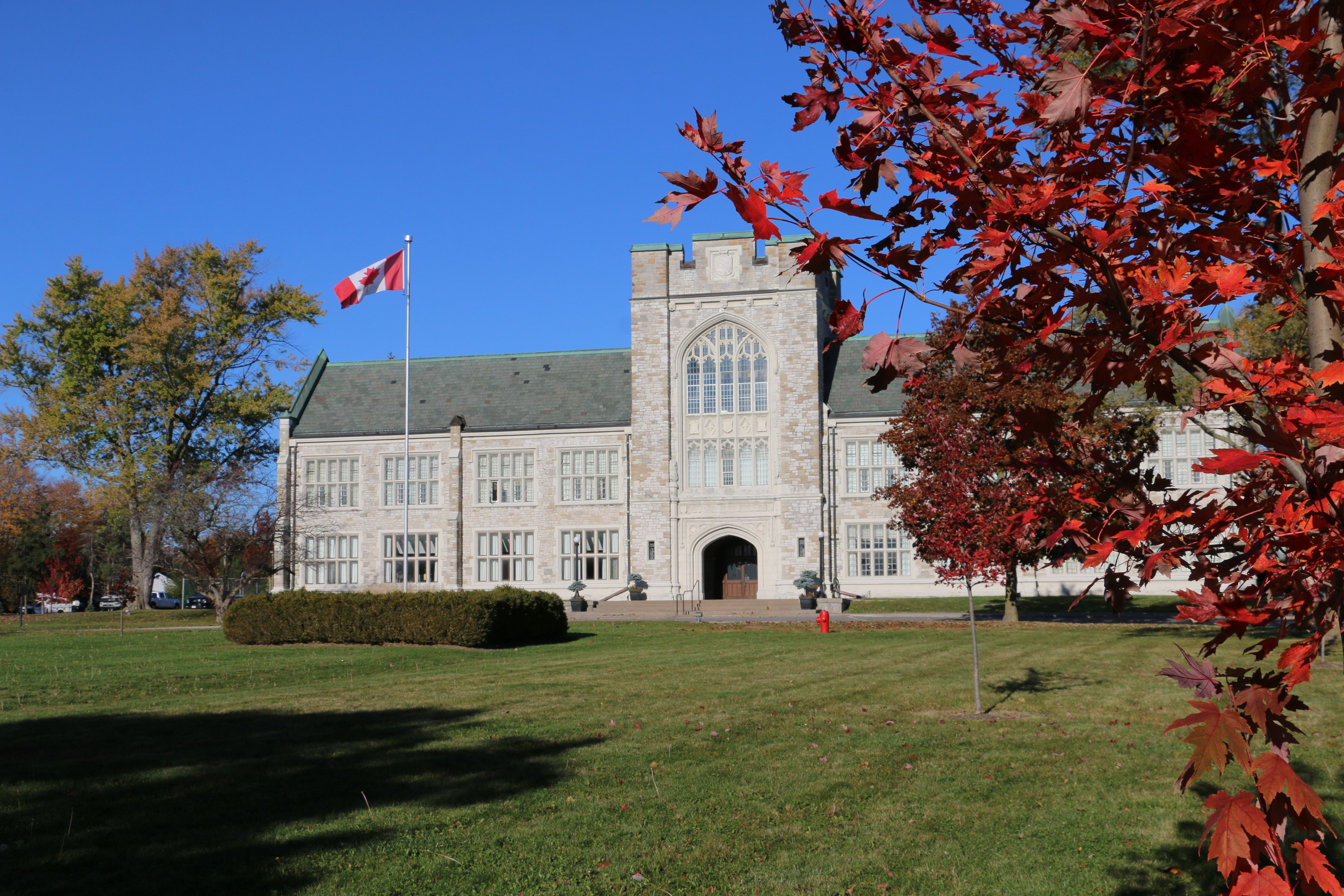
- Albert College's Senior School Building

Location
- 160 Dundas Street West; Belleville, Ontario, K8P 1A6; Canada
- Coordinates: 44°09′20″N 77°23′40″W

Information
- School type: Private Elementary school and high school
- Motto: Paci Artibusque, Pacis Faveo (I favour peace and the arts of peace)
- Religious affiliation: Non-denominational (Founded Methodist)
- Founded: 1857
- School number: 885126
- Head of School: Mark Musca
- Grades: Pre-Kindergarten to Grade 12 and Post-Graduate
- Language: English
- Campus: Located near the Bay of Quinte and downtown Belleville
- Website: albertcollege.ca

Albert College is a co-educational independent boarding and day school located in Belleville, Ontario, Canada. It is the oldest co-ed boarding independent school in Canada, and the only private boarding school in Belleville. Albert College currently has an enrolment of approximately 300 students from over 20 countries. The school comprises an Early Primary Learning Centre (Pre-Kindergarten), a Junior School (Junior Kindergarten to Grade 6), a Middle School (Grades 7 and 8), and a Senior School (Grades 9 to 12).

Boarding students are divided into three residences: Baker House, for Grade 7 to 9; Graham Hall, for Grade 10, 11 and 12; and Victoria Manor, for Grade 7 to 12. Albert College is also a day school for local students, who come mainly from Belleville, as well as the nearby communities of Picton, Napanee and Kingston. Students are transported in school vans or drive to school every day and return home every evening. Albert College's facilities include a chapel, a dining hall, several art rooms, and a science wing. Albert College offers a wide range of co-curricular programs, specialized arts programs, and an English foundation year for first-year students of English as a second language (ESL). In addition, ESL is also offered at Albert College during the annual summer-school program. Albert College offers varsity and intramural sports including swimming, lacrosse, rugby, basketball, soccer and others.

== History ==
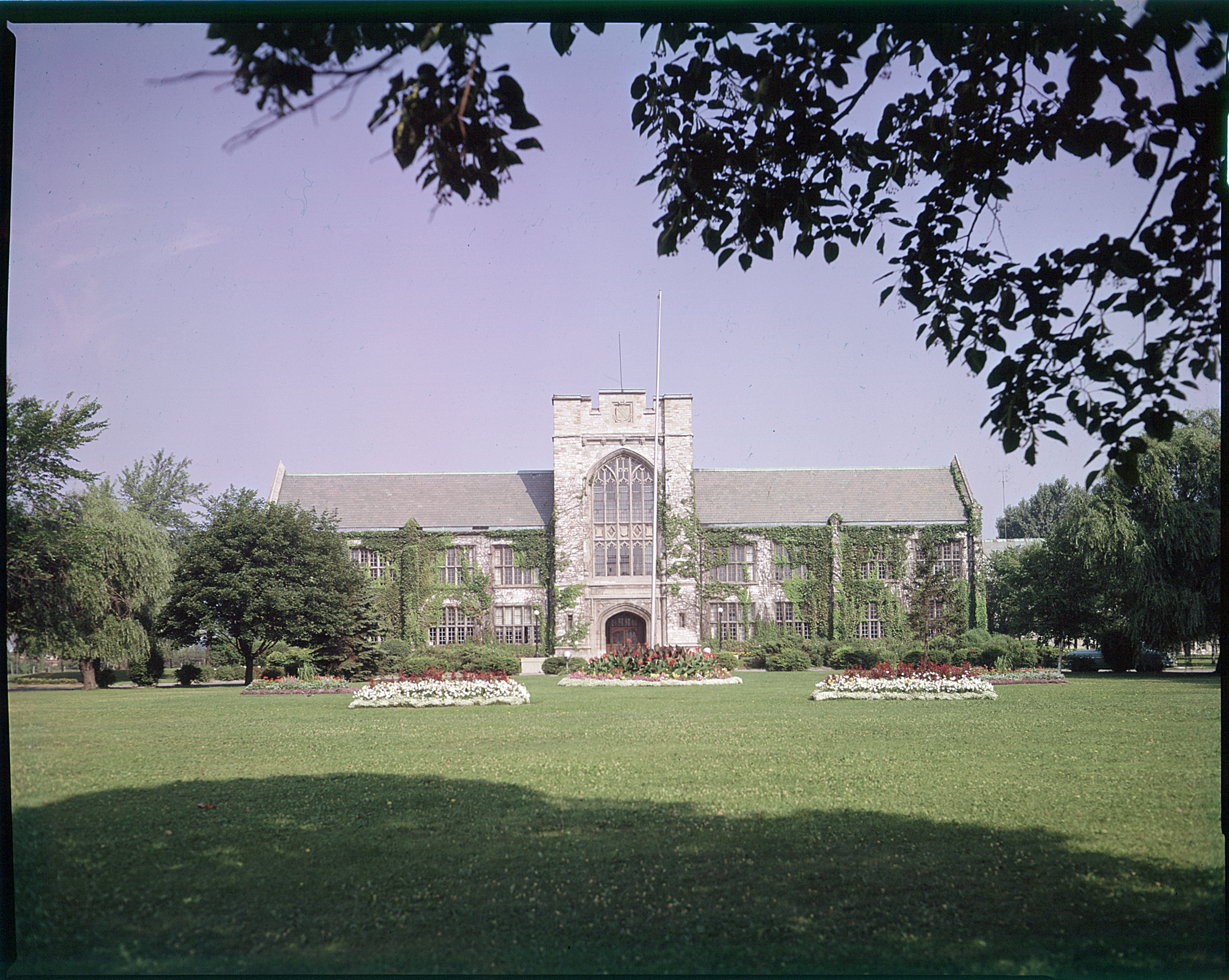
View of Albert College in 1959

Albert College was founded in 1857 by the Methodist Episcopal Church as the Belleville Seminary. Due to its strong academic record, Albert College received its university charter in 1866 and was renamed Albert University in honour of Prince Albert, the Prince Consort of Queen Victoria. Albert University was an affiliate of the University of Toronto. After the Methodist Episcopal Church merged into the Methodist Church of Canada in 1884, the school federated with Victoria College (University of Toronto). At that time, the school stopped offering university credits and became a high school.

In 1857, the original College was located on what is now College Street East in Belleville. It was designed to accommodate 150 residents, with classroom facilities for 400 students. It was partly destroyed by fire in the spring of 1917. Construction on the present Dundas Street West site began in 1923 and the new school opened in 1926, affiliated with the United Church of Canada. When Albert College relocated, it admitted boys only. In 1934, girls were welcomed once again.

The school was struck by fire again in 1980. This time, fire broke out in Victoria Manor, located nearby the main campus. The damage was limited primarily to the older of the two buildings that comprised the residence at the time. There were no serious injuries.

A plaque was erected by the Ontario Heritage Foundation, Ministry of Citizenship and Culture, on College Hill United Church at 16 North Park Street in Belleville:

Albert College
In 1854 the Methodist Episcopal Church, recognizing the need to improve the training of its clergy, began the construction of a seminary on this site. Designed to accommodate 150 residents with classroom facilities for 400 students. Belleville Seminary was opened in July 1857. Under the able direction of its principal, Reverend Albert Carman, the school flourished, producing several eminent graduates. In 1866 it was rechartered as Albert College, an affiliate of the University of Toronto, and five years later it became an independent degree-granting institution. When Victoria College in Cobourg was chosen as official university for the newly formed Methodist Church in 1884, Albert College became a private collegiate. Moved in 1926 to the present location overlooking the Bay of Quinte, it remains a distinguished school.

Albert College features several stained glass windows in their chapel, including a three light window (1986) by Robert McCausland Limited.

== See also ==
- Education in Ontario
- List of secondary schools in Ontario
