= Glenlyon Norfolk School =

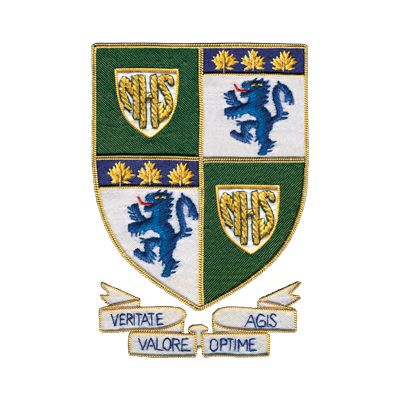

Location
- 781 Richmond Avenue; Victoria, British Columbia, V8S 3Z2; Canada; 48.4202°N 123.3300°W

Information
- School type: Independent, Co-ed, Day
- Motto: "Veritate Valore Optime Agis" (Do your best through truth and courage)
- Founded: 1932 (Glenlyon School); 1913 (Norfolk House); 1986 (amalgamation)
- Head of School: Chad Holtum
- Grades: JK-12
- Enrollment: 800
- Language: English
- Area: Junior Campus: Oak Bay, Middle & Senior Campus: Pemberton
- Colours: Blue and green
- Mascot: Gryphon
- Team name: Gryphons
- Website: www.mygns.ca

Glenlyon Norfolk School (GNS) is an independent, co-ed, university preparatory day school in Victoria and Oak Bay, British Columbia, Canada. It was formed in 1986 with the amalgamation of Glenlyon School and Norfolk House. The school offers instruction from Junior Kindergarten to Grade 12. The school offers the International Baccalaureate at all three levels: the Primary Years Programme, Middle Years Programme and, at the high school level, offers the IB Diploma Programme. Of the 2,124 schools that participate in the IB programme in North America and the Caribbean, Glenlyon Norfolk School is one of only 25 schools to offer the programme at all three levels.

GNS is a member of the International Baccalaureate Organization, Round Square, the Canadian Accredited Independent Schools (CAIS), Independent Schools Association of British Columbia (ISABC), and National Association of Independent Schools (NAIS).

As of February 2026, the current head of school continues to be Chad Holtum.

GNS was ranked by the Fraser Institute in 2017–18 as No. 9 out of 251 British Columbia Secondary Schools.

== History ==
In 1913, a pair of British women, Miss Atkins and Miss McDermott, founded Norfolk House School, an all-girls school on what is now the Pemberton Woods Campus. Glenlyon Preparatory School for boys was established on the Beach Campus location by Major Ian Simpson in 1933. The schools joined together in 1986 but maintain separate campuses. Crystal Shea is the principal in the junior school, Russell Marston the middle school, and Carolyn Green the senior School, while the entire school is administered by the head of school, Chad Holtum.

In 1996, the school was accepted as an International Baccalaureate World School and began offering the IB Diploma to students in Grades 11 and 12. This was followed by authorization to offer the IB Middle Years Programme in 2004 and the IB Primary Years Programme in 2007, making GNS one of a few schools in Canada to offer the full IB continuum.

In June 2007, the board of directors approved a plan for comprehensive campus transformation. In 2009, an artificial turf field was installed. In 2013 Denford Hall, seating over 350, was completed. The WONDER Campaign was launched in 2018 to refurbish the school's two campuses, at Beach Drive and Pemberton Woods, which was supported by a $5 million donation by Gordon Denford.

On May 24, 2019, the school celebrated the official opening of the school's new junior kindergarten and kindergarten facilities and the re-dedication of the boathouse, one of the buildings originally designed by Francis Rattenbury.

== Brother schools ==
Setagaya Gakuen School - Tokyo, Japan

== Heads of school ==
- 1987–1997: David Brooks
- 1997–2001: Charles Peacock
- 2001–2004: Barbara Emmerson
- 2004–2015: Simon Bruce-Lockhart
- 2015–2020: Dr Glenn Zederayko
- 2020–present: Chad Holtum

== Notable Graduates ==
- Chris Wylie, Canadian data consultant and whistleblower associated with the Cambridge Analytica data scandal. He claims to have dropped out at age 16 spending grades 9–11 at GNS.
- Solomon Yi-Kieran, Canadian student leader, political activist, and Vancouver city councilor-elect.
