= Robin Bruce Lockhart =

British writer (1920–2008)

Robert Norman Bruce Lockhart (13 April 1920 – 20 February 2008), known as Robin, was a British journalist, stock broker, and author.

== Biography ==
Bruce Lockhart was the only son of R. H. Bruce Lockhart, a British diplomat, secret agent, journalist, and author. He was educated at Eagle House School and the Royal Naval College, Dartmouth. During the Second World War he served in British naval intelligence, and was stationed in Singapore, where he met and married his first wife, Peggy in 1942. After the War he pursued a career in journalism, working for the Beaverbrook Press in London, Manchester and Glasgow. He later became a stock broker, while continuing to pursue his literary interests. He lived in Sussex and France.

Lockhart's book, Ace of Spies (1967), recounted the career of the secret agent Sidney Reilly, whose exploits with Lockhart's father in Russia in 1918 made headlines and appeared in the latter's Memoirs of a British Agent (1932). Robin Lockhart's book was adapted by Troy Kennedy Martin into the television miniseries Reilly: Ace of Spies (1983), starring Sam Neill as the title character, with Ian Charleson as his father. Since the miniseries, the book has been republished periodically under the title Reilly: Ace of Spies. Lockhart followed up with Reilly: The First Man (1987), in which he claimed that Reilly was never murdered by the Bolsheviks, but worked with them to plant the Cambridge Five moles.

Bruce Lockhart converted to Roman Catholicism. His book about the Carthusians, Half-way to Heaven (1985), came from his own experiences as a lay guest at St Hugh's Charterhouse, Parkminster. He subsequently wrote or edited two further volumes on the order.

In 1995 he wrote a preface to a new edition of his father's Scotch: The Whisky of Scotland in Fact and Story. Lockhart was then living in Hove, Sussex. He said he had done much fishing in Sutherland, in the River Oykel, Loch Stack, and Loch Craggie, and that after fishing he found that the local Glenmorangie whisky brought "a joyous, happy peace". A great-great-grandfather had owned the Balmenach distillery, and about 1980 he had himself served on a Which? panel, tasting malt whiskies. The ancestor in question was James McGregor, who in 1824 had taken out a licence for a distillery he had been working illicitly.

Lockhart was married three times and had one daughter by his first wife.

Lockhart died on 8 February 2008 in Brighton, Sussex. Probate was granted in the name of "Lockhart, Robert Bruce".

== Books ==
- Ace of Spies (1967), Hodder and Stoughton
  - Revised as: Reilly: Ace of Spies (1983), Futura, Macdonald & Co.
  - Revised as: Reilly: Ace of Spies (1992), Robin Clark
- Half-way to Heaven: The Hidden Life of the Sublime Carthusians (London: Thames Methuen, 1985)
- Reilly: The First Man (1987)
- Listening to Silence: an Anthology of Carthusian Writings (London: Darton, Longman and Todd, 1997)
- "O bonitas!" Hushed to silence: a Carthusian Monk (Salzburg: 2000)
