= Sandy Bruce-Lockhart, Baron Bruce-Lockhart =

British politician

The Right Honourable The Lord Bruce-Lockhart OBE
- Bruce-Lockhart in 2008

Member of the House of Lords
- Lord Temporal
- Life peerage 9 June 2006 – 14 August 2008

Leader of Kent County Council
- In office 1997–2005

Personal details
- Born: Alexander John Bruce-Lockhart; 4 May 1942 Wakefield, England
- Died: 14 August 2008 (aged 66) Maidstone, England
- Party: Conservative
- Spouse: Tess Pressland (m. 1966)
- Children: 3
- Relatives: Bruce Lockhart family
- Education: Dragon School; Sedbergh; Royal Agricultural College

Alexander John Bruce-Lockhart, Baron Bruce-Lockhart, OBE (4 May 1942 – 14 August 2008), commonly known as Sandy Bruce-Lockhart, was a British Conservative politician and a senior figure in English local government. He was the leader of Kent County Council and then Chairman of the Local Government Association. He was succeeded in the latter post by Simon Milton, ex-Leader of Westminster Council.

== Early life ==
Bruce-Lockhart was born on 4 May 1942 in Wakefield, into the Scottish Bruce Lockhart family, which held close ties to the diplomatic service. His father, John Bruce Lockhart, was deputy director of MI6 and a university administrator. His mother was Margaret Evelyn Hone. He was educated at the Dragon School, Sedbergh, and the Royal Agricultural College, Cirencester.

He was the younger brother of James Bruce Lockhart (1941–2018), a diplomat, intelligence officer, author, and artist.

== Career ==
He left the United Kingdom to work in the then Rhodesia (now Zimbabwe), managing a large farm for a South African owner. After a period in Australia, he returned to live in Kent in 1968, where he had a dairy farm, then a 300-acre (1.2 km^{2}) fruit farm, in Headcorn.

After joining the Conservatives in 1984, he became a county councillor for Maidstone Rural East in 1989. At the time he was chairman of a rail committee in the Weald of Kent preservation society, which had been protesting about what he then regarded as the destructive route of the Channel tunnel rail link. He became leader of the opposition Conservative group in 1993 and leader of the Council in 1997, retaining the post until 2005. While leader of Kent County Council, Bruce-Lockhart became a controversial figure on the national political stage for his introduction of a local version of the recently repealed anti-gay Section 28 legislation. In July 2004, having been vice-chairman for two years, Lord Bruce-Lockhart succeeded Sir Jeremy Beecham to become Chairman of the Local Government Association, following the Conservatives becoming the largest political group in the Association as the result of the local elections in May.

He was made a Knight Bachelor in the New Year's Honours List of December 2002, having previously been appointed OBE. On 11 April 2006, it was announced that he was to be elevated to a life peerage, and on 9 June 2006 he was gazetted as Baron Bruce-Lockhart, of The Weald in the County of Kent. On 24 May 2007 it was announced that he had been appointed as Chair of English Heritage.

On 17 June 2008, Lord Bruce-Lockhart was made an honorary Freeman of the City of Canterbury.

== Personal life ==
In 1966, Bruce-Lockhart married Tess Pressland, and they had two sons and a daughter. He died from cancer in Maidstone on 14 August 2008.

Preceded by Sir Jeremy Beecham	Chair of the Local Government Association; 2004–2007	Succeeded by Sir Simon Milton
Preceded by John Ovenden	Leader of Kent County Council; 1997–2005	Succeeded by Paul Carter
