= Bozzo =

Bozzo is an Italian surname. Notable people with this surname include:

- Briggitte Bozzo (born 2001), Venezuelan actress
- Elisa Bozzo (born 1987), Italian synchronised swimmer
- Gianni Baget Bozzo (1925–2009), Italian Catholic priest and politician
- Grazia Bozzo (born 1936), Italian gymnast
- Laura Bozzo (born 1951), Peruvian talk show hostess
- Luisa Angela Bozzo, real name of Luisella Boni, Italian actress
- Nicola Bozzo (born 2004), Italian rugby union player
- Sam Bozzo (born 1969), American film director and author
- Virginia Reginato Bozzo (born 1939), Chilean politician
