= John Dawson (surgeon) =

- John Dawson (1734–1820). Portrait by William Whiston Barney.
- Born: 1734; Raygill, Garsdale, England
- Died: 19 September 1820 (aged 85–86); Sedbergh, England
- Education: University of Edinburgh
- Known for: Calculating distance to the Sun
- Scientific career
- Fields: Physician, mathematician
- Academic advisors: Edward Waring
- Notable students: John Bell; George Birkbeck; Miles Bland; George Butler; John Haygarth; James Inman; Adam Sedgwick; Nicholas Conyngham Tindal; Robert Willan; Thomas Wilson

John Dawson (1734 – 19 September 1820) was both an English mathematician and physician. He was born at Raygill in Garsdale, then in the West Riding of Yorkshire, where "Dawson's Rock" celebrates the site of his early thinking about conic sections. After learning surgery from Henry Bracken of Lancaster, he worked as a surgeon in Sedbergh for a year, then went to study medicine at Edinburgh, walking 150 miles there with his savings stitched into his coat. Despite a very frugal lifestyle, he was unable to complete his degree, and had to return to Garsdale until he earned enough as a surgeon and as a private tutor in Mathematics at Sedbergh School to enable him to complete his MD from London in 1765.

Dawson published The Doctrine of Philosophical Necessity Briefly Invalidated in 1781, arguing against Joseph Priestley's doctrine of Philosophical Necessity, but his main skill was in Mathematics. He was a private tutor to many undergraduates at the University of Cambridge where his pupils included twelve Senior Wranglers between 1781 and 1807. Although he published little original work, he was skilled in correcting errors in the work of others. He studied the orbit of the Moon and the dynamics of objects in central force fields, correcting serious errors in the calculations of the distance between the Earth and the Sun, and confirming an error in Newton's precession calculations.

He is notable as a mentor of Adam Sedgwick, James Inman, George Butler and many other public figures of the nineteenth century.

== Education ==
After a rudimentary education at the Revd Charles Udal's school in Garsdale, Dawson worked until he was about twenty as a shepherd on his father's freehold, developing an interest in mathematics in his spare time with the aid of books that he bought with the profits from stocking knitting or borrowed from his elder brother, who had become an excise officer. Despite being entirely self-taught he worked up his own system of conic sections and began to establish himself as a teacher of mathematics, often spending two or three months at a time in the houses of his pupils.

== Tutoring ==
What began as a purely local reputation spread quickly, from 1756, when three young men, including the future physician John Haygarth, and Adam Sedgwick's father, Richard Sedgwick, read with him before going up to Cambridge. But the profession on which Dawson embarked was that of a surgeon. In this he was influenced by Henry Bracken, the eminent Lancaster surgeon, with whom he worked as an assistant and pupil. For a year, back in Sedbergh, he practised as a surgeon and then, with his accumulated savings of £100 stitched in his clothing, walked to Edinburgh to study medicine and mathematics. Despite his frugality he could not stay long enough to take a degree and he returned to Sedbergh to resume his practice and save in preparation for another austere period of study, this time in London. His stay in the capital was brief, but he gained experience in the London hospitals, attended surgical and medical lectures, and made a contact, with Edward Waring, the Lucasian professor of mathematics at Cambridge, that was to be important for his future work as a mathematician. Returning to Sedbergh with a diploma, he made his general practice the best in the north-western dales and soon enjoyed security, even prosperity.

== Personal life ==
On 3 March 1767 he married Ann Thirnbeck of Middleton, near Sedbergh. The one daughter of the marriage, Mary, born on 15 January 1768, was to be an important companion to Dawson in his later years, following the death of his wife in 1812.

== Mathematics ==
For over twenty years Dawson maintained his medical practice while also pursuing his work as a mathematician, and it was only from about 1790 that he devoted himself exclusively to mathematical teaching. By then his fame as a teacher was attracting a regular stream of pupils, including Cambridge undergraduates who read with him during the long vacation and others who were preparing for entry to the university. For a fee of about 5 shillings a week for unlimited tuition, in addition to the cost of accommodation and food, sometimes in Dawson's house but more commonly in a local inn, pupils were taught in a characteristic peripatetic fashion. As Adam Sedgwick, who read with him in 1804 before going up to Cambridge and subsequently during vacations, recalled, Dawson would seat his pupils, often a dozen or more, at tables about the house and move constantly from one to another, correcting and advising. Dawson's method achieved remarkable results. Between 1781 and 1794, at least seven, possibly eight, of the fourteen senior wranglers at Cambridge had been taught by him, as had four others between 1797 and 1807. Among these were the future chancery barrister John Bell, the Arabist John Palmer, the lawyer and anti-slavery campaigner Thomas Harrison, James Inman, who went on to become professor of mathematics at the Royal Naval College, Portsmouth, and George Butler, later headmaster of Harrow and dean of Peterborough, whose vivid account of the journey of almost five days between London and Sedbergh and his introduction to Dawson was published in The Sedberghian for December 1881. Pupils who went on to Cambridge and did not achieve the rank of senior wrangler included, in addition to Richard and Adam Sedgwick and Haygarth, the lord chief justice Sir Nicholas Conyngham Tindal, the mathematician Miles Bland, who was at Sedbergh School, and several bishops. Among those whose medical interests took them to Edinburgh rather than Cambridge were Robert Willan, Thomas Garnett, and George Birkbeck.

Dawson maintained his active engagement in mathematics into his seventies. But from 1812, with his memory and physical strength failing, he took no further pupils. An anonymous correspondent writing from Trinity College, Cambridge, in the European Magazine urged the university to recognize his status as the first mathematician of England by awarding him an honorary degree. But his original contributions to mathematics were not numerous, and the only formal honour they brought him was election as a corresponding member of the Manchester Literary and Philosophical Society.

His earliest and most substantial publication was his Four Propositions, which appeared anonymously in 1769 in an edition that was largely destroyed by fire. In it Dawson identified errors in the calculation that had led Matthew Stewart, the professor of mathematics at Edinburgh, to overestimate the distance between the Earth and the Sun by more than a quarter. He pursued his argument vigorously when he was attacked by Samuel Horsley in the Philosophical Transactions of the Royal Society; his reply in the Gentleman's Magazine (40, 1770, pp. 452–3) made no concessions and reinforced the respect in which he was held by several Edinburgh mathematicians and natural philosophers, including John Playfair, Lord Webb Seymour, and Henry Lord Brougham, all of whom visited him in Sedbergh. By comparison with Four Propositions his other mathematical publications were slight. The most important of them was a series of rather combative letters signed ‘Wadson’ and published in Charles Hutton's Miscellanea Mathematica, in which he criticized a paper by Charles Wildbore on the velocity of water emerging from vessels in motion (this exchange is dated to 1773 and 1774; the parts of Miscellanea Mathematica were gathered in a volume with title=page year, 1775). An earlier exchange, in which Dawson took the side of Thomas Simpson against William Emerson, by offering an independent analytical demonstration of the existence of an error in Newton's treatment of precession, passed off less agreeably, with Emerson disabusing Dawson as roundly as he had Simpson, according to the report in Life and Letters of the Reverend Adam Sedgwick.

== Metaphysics and philosophy ==
Dawson's interests also embraced metaphysics and theology, subjects that he explored in correspondence with a favourite early pupil, the Rev. Thomas Wilson, headmaster of the grammar schools first in Slaidburn and then in Clitheroe. Described by Adam Sedgwick as ‘a firm believer and a good sober practical Christian of the old school’, Dawson abhorred the doctrines of David Hume and applauded James Beattie's attack on Humean scepticism. In a similar spirit he wrote against Joseph Priestley's The Doctrine of Philosophical Necessity (1777), which he regarded as immoral in tendency and false. His 24-page pamphlet outlining his views on the damaging consequences and unsure foundations of an acceptance of determinism, The Doctrine of Philosophical Necessity Briefly Invalidated (1781), elicited a dismissive, unsigned rejoinder in the Monthly Review (65, 1781, pp. 66–8), which he answered in an appendix to a second edition of the work in 1803. Although Dawson is said to have retained the respect of Priestley and his other adversaries, his contribution lacked the sophistication that the debate demanded at the highest level and it made little lasting mark.

The impact that Dawson had on those who knew him was heightened by a commanding physical presence well conveyed in the portraits that survive of him. The original of one of the portraits, painted by Joseph Allen in 1809 and showing Dawson teaching a seated pupil, had already been lost by the mid-nineteenth century, but it survived in the form of a copy by the vicar of Sedbergh, the Revd D. M. Peacock, and an engraving by W. W. Barney. The other, a watercolour painted by William Westall in 1817 of a sombre and very elderly Dawson, went to private hands. Striking though Dawson's appearance was, however, he was revered above all for his simplicity of manner and a cheerful, benevolent temperament that left him, in Adam Sedgwick's words, ‘without any stiffness or affectation of superiority’.

== Death ==
He died, on 19 September 1820, and a monument high in the nave of St Andrew's Church in Sedbergh was erected, in the form of a bust of him by Robert William Sievier, with an inscription, dated August 1825, by his former pupil John Bell.
