= Robert Skene =

Robert Skene may refer to:

- Robert Skene (polo player) (1914–1997), Australian polo player
- Robert Skene (cricketer) (1908–1988), English cricketer
- Robert Skene (British Army officer) (1719–1787), British Army officer and politician
