= Thomas Barker (Australian politician) =

Australian businessman and politician

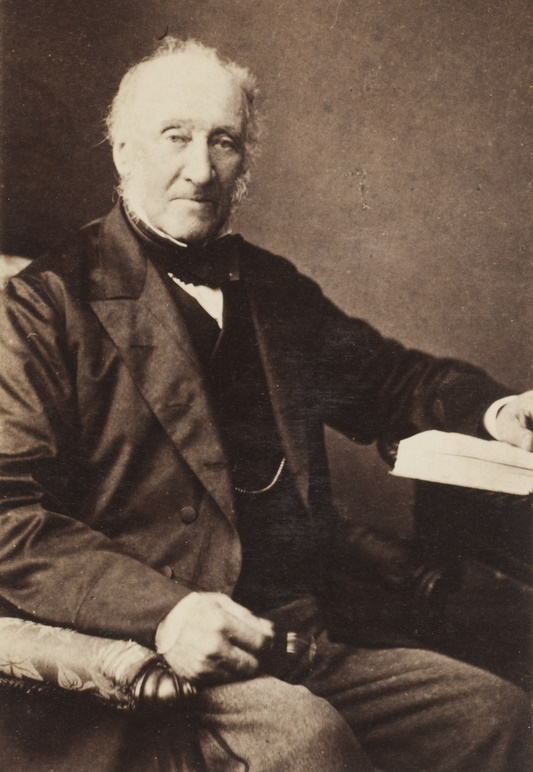
- Thomas Barker, photographed in 1873.

Personal details
- Born: 25 March 1799 London, England
- Died: 12 March 1875 (aged 75) Bringelly, New South Wales
- Spouse(s): (1) Joanna Dickson (2) Katherine Heath Gray

Thomas Barker (25 March 1799 – 12 March 1875) was an Australian businessman and politician who was an integral proponent of many of Sydney's earliest business, educational and political institutions. He was an appointed member of the New South Wales Legislative Council between 1853 and 1856 and an elected member of the New South Wales Legislative Assembly for one term from 1856 to 1858.

== Biography ==
=== Early life ===
Thomas Barker was born on 25 March 1799 in Soho in London's West End, the son of James Barker and Mary (née Shuldham). Thomas was schooled at an early age at Chambers' academy near St Martin's le Grand, followed by a school at Writtle (near Chelmsford, county Essex), and later at Dumas's academy at Hackney, London. Both his parents died when Barker was aged nine, after which he was raised by a guardian.

In about 1813, aged fourteen, Barker was apprenticed to an engineer named John Dickson, with a workshop at Southwark in south London. Dickson applied for permission to settle in New South Wales and was permitted a town grant in Sydney and land in the hinterland "proportionate to his capital". Dickson and his apprentices, including Thomas Barker, arrived in Sydney aboard the Earl Spencer in October 1813. Dickson arrived in the colony with tools and machinery, including a steam-engine and turning lathes from his Southwark manufactory.^{[A]}

=== Sydney ===
In Sydney John Dickson found "so limited a field... for his business as a practical engineer" that he established himself in business as an agent for the manufacture and selling of flour, in the process of which he built the first flour-mill in the colony.

Thomas Barker and Joanna Dickson were married on 4 June 1823 at St. Philip's church in Sydney. Joanna was the niece of John Dickson and the eldest daughter of James and Helen Dickson of Bringelly. The couple had no children.

In May 1824 Barker was granted 800 acres (324 ha) of land at Yass.

=== Business enterprises ===
Barker established a reputation as a skilful engineer and millwright and in the mid-1820s commenced business on his own account. In 1826, in partnership with John Smith, he constructed a large windmill at Darlinghurst, followed soon afterwards by another in the vicinity.^{[B]} In about 1828, owing to an increase in business, Barker purchased a 16 horse-power steam flour-mill from Messrs. Cooper and Levy. The mill was in a dilapidated condition and required extensive repair work before being incorporated into Barker's expanding business enterprises. Barker's mill produced flour, pollard and bran, sold from his warehouse at Darling Harbour. By the early 1830s Barker's works were also producing biscuits for the provisioning of ships on long voyages.

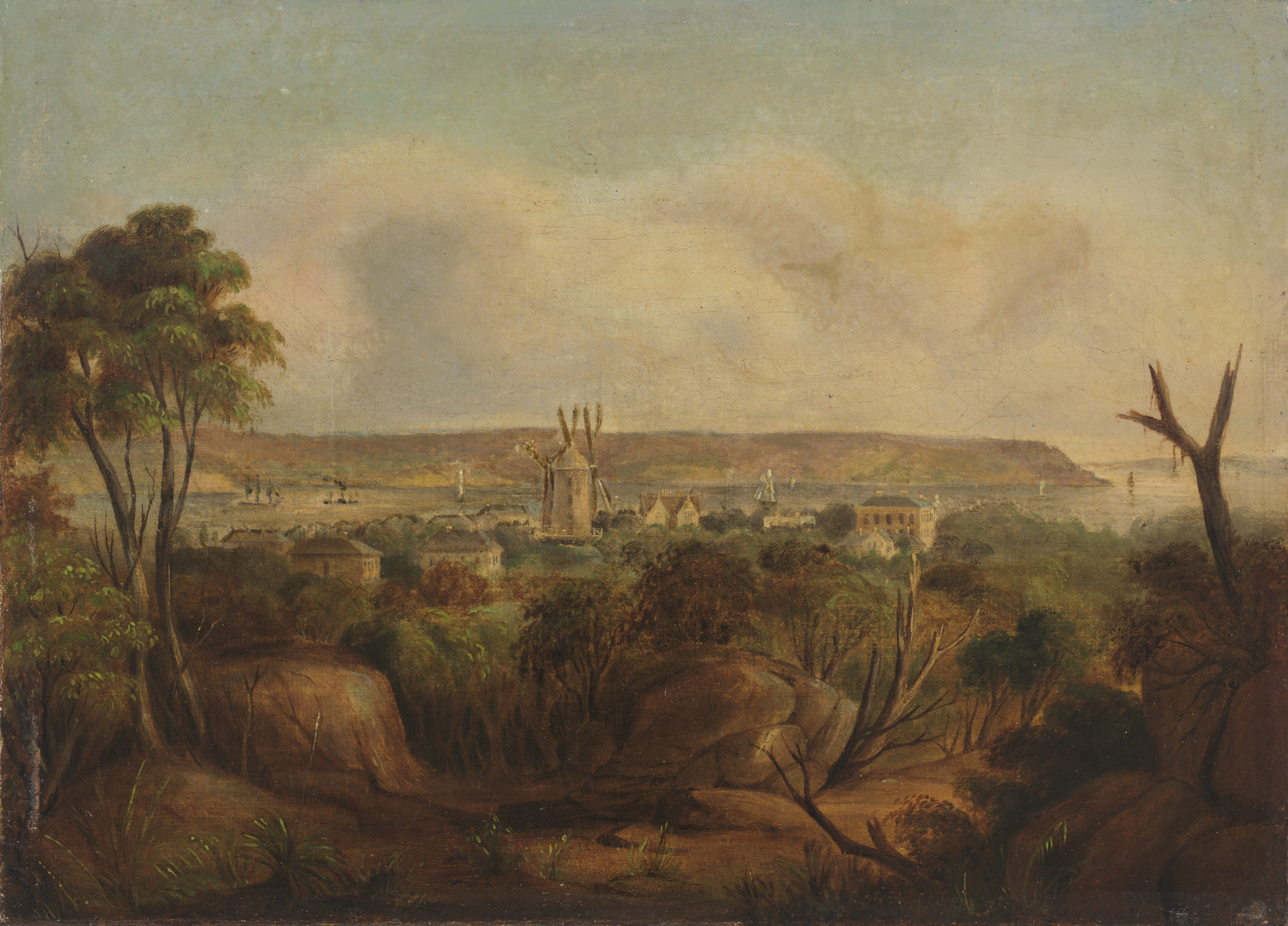
'View of part of Wooloomooloo and Mr. Barker's house and mills with Bradleys Point', painting by George Edwards Peacock (1844).

In 1833 Barker purchased sixteen acres (6.4 hectares) at Potts Point where he had built the palatial 'Roslyn Hall', designed by the colonial architect Ambrose Hallen.^{[C]} By the 1830s Barker had purchased three extensive farms, including 'Nonorrah' (later named 'Maryland') at the Cowpastures and 'Mummel' on the Goulburn Plains.

In 1834 Barker was appointed as a magistrate. By the end of 1834 Barker's various enterprises had been so successful that he was able to retire from the milling business, which he leased to his brother James for two thousand pounds a year.

In 1837 Barker "was ordered by his medical advisors to take a sea-voyage for the restoration of his health, which had become much impaired". He and his wife visited China and the Cape of Good Hope, from where they proceeded to Britain, where they resided in Edinburgh for a short period. Barker arrived in Scotland "with a reputation of having acquired great wealth" in the New South Wales colony. After undertaking a tour of various European countries, the couple returned to Sydney in September 1840.

To carry out his flour milling business James Barker entered into partnership with Ambrose Hallen, but their enterprise was an early casualty of the economic depression in the colony during the early 1840s. By the time of Thomas Barker's arrival back in Sydney, his brother James was in severe financial difficulties. While living in Edinburgh, Thomas Barker had received ten thousand pounds from Dr. Graham, Professor of Botany at the University of Edinburgh, to be invested in the New South Wales colony in the form of mortgages at ten percent per annum interest. On returning to Sydney Barker lent six thousand pounds of Dr. Graham's money to his brother James, on the security of a portion his brother's 'Castle Forbes' estate at Singleton. Almost immediately after the mortgage was effected, the symptoms of the developing financial depression began to show themselves, James Barker's flour-milling business became insolvent and the stake in 'Castle Forbes' proved to be a bad investment, as a consequence of which in the following years interest on the loan ceased to be paid and "about two-thirds" of the principal "was given up as lost".^{[D]}

Thomas Barker had resumed his business interests after returning to Sydney, and from about 1843 carried on business with his brother as T. Barker and Co., based at his Sussex Street flour-mills. In 1843, with the introduction of district councils to the colony, Barker was appointed a warden of the district of Sydney.

During the 1840s Barker and George Hobler formed a partnership to run sheep and cattle on the 'Nap Nap' pastoral run on the lower Murrumbidgee River (near the junction with the Lachlan River). Hobler sold his share of the leasehold to Barker in 1848.

Barker's wife Joanna died on 24 December 1851 at 'Roslyn Hall' in Darlinghurst.

In the late 1840s Barker built a mill for the manufacture of wool into tweed fabric, located adjacent to his extensive flour-mills near the corner of Sussex and Bathurst Streets. The machinery was substantially manufactured in the colony and worked by a 16 horse-power steam engine. The woollen-mill began operations in 1852. From March 1853 the mill was operated in a partnership with O. B. Ebsworth (who had married James Barker's daughter Frances the previous year). In July 1854 Ebsworth sold his interest to Thomas Barker.^{[E]}

Since the 1830s Barker had purchased pastoral land in the Goulburn district (county of Argyle), which he continued to do until the 1850s.

=== Railways ===
Barker was an early promoter of railways in the colony. In May 1846 the government declined to have a survey made of a proposed railway line from Sydney to Goulburn. Thomas Woore, a Goulburn pastoralist with surveying experience and son-in-law of John Dickson, examined possible routes and reported his findings to a public meeting in Sydney in August 1846. Barker was a member of the committee formed at the meeting to collect subscriptions for a detailed survey to be carried out, and he himself subscribed an initial £25 to the fund.

Barker was a member of the provisional committee of the then-named Sydney Tramroad and Railway Company, formed in early 1849. He was one of six directors of the Sydney Railway Company, which was incorporated in October 1849. He occupied a seat on the board of directors until the property of the company was sold to the New South Wales government in January 1955, after which Barker was appointed to the honorary government position of Commissioner of Railways.

=== Colonial Parliament ===
In April 1853 Thomas Barker was appointed as a non-elective member of the New South Wales Legislative Council, replacing Thomas Icely who had resigned from his position. He served on the Legislative Council until February 1856.

In 1856, at the first colonial election after the granting of responsible government for New South Wales, Barker decided to nominate as a candidate for a seat in the newly-formed Legislative Assembly. He initially offered himself as a candidate for the electorate of St. Vincent, "but after remaining in the field for some weeks and canvassing the district, he retired from the contest". He then nominated for the seat of Gloucester and Macquarie. At the polling held in April 1956 Barker was one of three candidates. He topped the poll with 163 votes (or 37.73 percent). Barker served as the member for Gloucester and Macquarie in the first responsible parliament and was defeated against one other candidate at the following election in February 1858 with 275 votes (or 39.29 percent). He did not stand for further public office.

In 1857 Thomas Barker married Katherine Heath Gray. The couple had one child, a son named Thomas Charles (1863-1940).

=== Other interests ===
Barker was elected as a director of the Commercial Banking Company at a meeting of subscribers to the newly-formed bank in September 1834. He was appointed as a trustee of the New South Wales Savings Bank and was a director of the Sydney Exchange Company.

Barker was a promoter of Sydney's earliest educational institutions and a benefactor to Sydney Grammar School, Sydney Mechanics' School of Arts and the University of Sydney. In 1853 he contributed the sum of one thousand pounds for the foundation of a scholarship to encourage "the advancement of Mathematical Science" at Sydney University, to be awarded as an "annual value of £50 in perpetuity". In 1857 Barker contributed £100 for a side window in the university's Great Hall.

Barker had wide philanthropic interests. He was a director of the charity, the Society for the Relief of Destitute Children, established in 1853. In May 1856 the cornerstone of the Destitute Children's Asylum was laid at Randwick by the Governor-General "in the presence of a large and influential assembly".

Barker was a trustee of the Sydney Bethel Union and, with his wife, an active member of the Sydney Female Refuge Society.

=== Last years ===
Thomas Barker died on 12 March 1875 at his 'Maryland' farm, near Bringelly. He was buried in the Newtown cemetery.

== Notes ==
A.The Earl Spencer departed from England in June 1813 and arrived at Sydney on 9 October. The passengers included 200 convicts, three of whom died during the voyage.

B.One source records the location of Barker's windmill as being in Macleay Street in Potts Point, just north of Darlinghurst.

C.'Roslyn Hall' and surrounding land was bounded by Darlinghurst Road and Roslyn Street and Roslyn Gardens in Potts Point (to the west of Rushcutters Bay). This was one of Sydney's largest personal residences until it was demolished in 1937.

D.After Dr. Graham's death, his son and administrator bought a law suit against Thomas Barker and his solicitor John Norton for recovery of the money his father had invested. The case was heard in the Supreme Court in Sydney in late March 1848, resulting in the jury awarding damages of £6,160 to the plaintiff.

E.In 1862 Ebsworth purchased the woollen-mill on his own account. After Ebsworth's death in 1870 was taken over again by Barker. The mill was acquired by John Vicars in 1874.

New South Wales Legislative Council
Preceded by Thomas Icely	Appointed member 1853 – 1856	Original council abolished
New South Wales Legislative Assembly
New parliament	Member for Gloucester and Macquarie; 1856 – 1858	Succeeded by James Williamson
