= James Bland =

James Bland may refer to:

- James Bland (priest) (c. 1666–1728), English-born Anglican priest in Ireland
- James Bland (actor) (born 1985), American actor, writer, director, and producer
- James A. Bland (1854–1911), American musician, song writer, and minstrel performer
- James W. D. Bland (1838–1870), African-American politician from Virginia
