= Michael Sachs =

Michael Sachs may refer to:

- Michael Sachs (rabbi)
- Michael Sachs (judge)

== See also ==
- Michael Sacks, American actor
