= David Hirst (journalist) =

British journalist (1936–2025)

- Born: 26 May 1936; Grange-over-Sands, Cumbria, England
- Died: 22 September 2025 (aged 89); Castelnaudary, France
- Occupations: Journalist; correspondent

David John Hirst (26 May 1936 – 22 September 2025) was a British journalist and foreign correspondent who reported extensively on the Middle East. Based for most of his career in Beirut, he wrote for The Guardian from 1964 to 2001 and continued contributing until 2013. He was described as the paper’s "authoritative correspondent" through four decades of change in the region. Hirst focused heavily on the Arab–Israeli conflict and was described as having an academic approach to journalism. His books include The Gun and the Olive Branch (1977), a history of the Arab–Israeli conflict, and Beware of Small States: Lebanon, Battleground of the Middle East (2010).

== Early life and education ==
Hirst was born on 26 May 1936 in Grange-over-Sands, Cumbria, England. He attended Rugby School before his then-compulsory military service took him to Egypt and Cyprus at the age of 18. Between 1954 and 1956 he lived in the Middle East, traveling widely in the Levant before leaving shortly before the outbreak of the Suez War. Reflecting on this period, he later remarked that he had arrived with little knowledge of the Middle East, "hardly [knowing] the difference between Israelis and Arabs." Hirst then studied at the University of Oxford. In 1959, he returned to Lebanon and enrolled at the American University of Beirut, where he studied until 1963 and learned Arabic.

== Career ==
In 1964, Hirst began writing for The Guardian, based in Beirut and Cyprus, a position he held until 2001. He continued to contribute occasionally, including obituaries, until 2013. He also wrote for The Christian Science Monitor, The Irish Times, the St. Petersburg Times in Florida, Newsday, the San Francisco Chronicle, the Middle East Eye and the Daily Star in Lebanon.

Hirst focused heavily on the Arab–Israeli conflict. He was described as having a serious and academic approach to journalism. His reporting led to periodic bans from Egypt, Syria, Saudi Arabia and Iraq following critical coverage of their governments. He was among the few journalists to report from Hama after the Syrian army's 1982 assault on the city, which left thousands dead, writing of "the depth of the crisis in the existing Arab order, and, for Syria specifically, the bankruptcy of the ruling Ba'ath party and its self-appointed mission of bringing 'unity, freedom and socialism' to a divided and backward Arab nation." During the 1980s, when Beirut became notorious for the kidnapping of Westerners by Shia militias, Hirst was twice targeted but managed to escape in the early stages of both attempts. In 2001, he described Yasser Arafat as marked by "notorious egotism" and a career of "ever-growing moderation." On the day of Saddam Hussein's execution in 2006, Hirst described him as "the model of a certain type of developing world despot," whose main ambition had been to seize and maintain power, and who was "destructive in exercising it."

Hirst's history of the Arab–Israeli conflict, The Gun and the Olive Branch: The Roots of Violence in the Middle East, was published in 1977, with updated editions in 1984 and 2003. The New Republic described it as "the most malignantly anti-Israeli book ever to be published in English by someone who claims to be a serious commentator." According to The Guardian, senior editors were routinely admonished by Israeli embassy officials who regarded Hirst's coverage as biased. He later co-authored a biography of Egyptian president Anwar Sadat with Irene Beeson. His third book, Beware of Small States: Lebanon, Battleground of the Middle East, was published in 2010 and examined Lebanon's role in the wider Arab–Israeli conflict.

In November 2024, Hirst wrote an article on the Middle East Eye questioning if Israel was "going mad" over its plans for a Greater Israel that were motivated by religion and the genocide in Gaza.

== Personal life ==
In 1995, Hirst married Amina, a social anthropologist of Egyptian heritage.

== Later life and legacy ==
Hirst and his wife spent the last decade of his life in France. He died from cancer on 22 September 2025, in Castelnaudary, Aude, at the age of 89.

According to his obituary in The Guardian, Hirst was the paper's "authoritative correspondent" through four decades of change in the Middle East, covering events from the Six-Day War in 1967 to the return of the Palestinian leadership to Gaza in 1994. His articles were described as a "trusted key to understanding the region's turmoil."

== Bibliography ==
- Oil and Public Opinion in the Middle East (1966). ISBN 0-571-06593-7. LCCN 66-12984.
- Sadat (with Irene Beeson) (1981). ISBN 0-571-11690-6. LCCN 82-670063.
- The Gun and the Olive Branch: The Roots of Violence in the Middle East (1977; 2nd ed. 1984; new foreword 2003). ISBN 0-571-21945-4. LCCN 77-376983.
- Beware of Small States: Lebanon, Battleground of the Middle East (2010). ISBN 978-0-571-23741-8. LCCN 2009-942493.
- حذار من الدول الصغيرة: لبنان، ساحةُ معارك الشرق الأوسط (Beware of Small States: Lebanon, Battleground of the Middle East, Arabic ed.). Rimal Publications, 2013. ISBN 978-9963-610-99-0

== See also ==
- Robert Fisk
- David Holden (journalist)
- Jim Muir
