= Christian Bjelland IV =

Norwegian industrialist and art collector

Christian Bjelland IV (born January 29, 1954) is a Norwegian industrialist and art collector. Born in Stavanger, Norway, Bjelland is the great-grandson of the Norwegian industrial pioneer Christian Bjelland (1858–1927) and current chairman and owner of Chr. Bjelland & Co. AS. He was educated at Sedbergh School, England (1967–1972), Dartmouth College (AB, summa cum laude, Phi Beta Kappa, 1976) and Harvard Business School (MBA, 1978). He worked for The Boston Consulting Group in London from 1978 to 1982. He was vice chairman of Den norske Bank ASA (1991–1996) and chairman of Kvaerner ASA (1996–2001). He was also chairman of The National Museum of Art in Oslo, Norway (2001–2008). Bjelland was selected as a "Global Leader of Tomorrow" at the 1997 World Economic Forum in Davos.

Bjelland has been honorary Consul for Finland in Norway since 1983 and Consul-General since 2000. He has been a board member of the Norwegian freedom of speech foundation Fritt Ord since 2001. He was made Knight 1st class of the Royal Norwegian Order of St. Olav in 2005. Bjelland has also been made Knight 1st class of the Order of the White Rose of Finland and Commander 1st class of the Order of the Lion of Finland.

Bjelland is married to Teresita Alvarez-Bjelland, former Harvard Alumni Association President and Harvard Medal recipient. They have a daughter and a son together.
