= Roger Sangwin =

England international rugby union player

- Full name: Roger Dennis Sangwin
- Born: 2 December 1937 Holderness, Yorkshire
- Died: 11 March 2022 (aged 84)

Rugby union career
- Position: Centre
International career
Years	Team	Apps	(Points)
1964	England	2	(0)

Roger Dennis Sangwin (2 December 1937 – 11 March 2022) was an English rugby union international.

A Sedbergh School product, Sangwin was a Yorkshire Schoolboys representative player.

Sangwin, an architect by profession, spent his entire rugby career with Hull & East Riding. He was capped twice by England as a centre in 1964, debuting against the touring All Blacks. His other appearance was in England's opening Five Nations fixture against Wales at Twickenham, which finished in a draw.

== See also ==
- List of England national rugby union players
