= Imogen Boddy =

British runner

Imogen Boddy, also known as Imo (born 1999), is a British ultra marathon runner. She broke the world record holder as the youngest female to have run the length of the UK at the age of 22 and the fastest female globally to have completed the UK's National Three Peak challenge on foot at the age of 24.

== Career history ==
Boddy was born in Malton, Yorkshire, England. She attended Sedbergh School, a public school in the town of Sedbergh, Cumbria, North West England, famous for its sports tradition. Many Old Sedberghians have national caps and international tournament experience or have represented the school at national level competitions in various disciplines. While attending Sedbergh School as an Upper Sixth pupil, Boddy also created "The Boddy Challenge". The triathlon event consists of a 6 miles swim in Lake Windermere, followed by a marathon around the lake and a 20 miles cycle back to Sedbergh from Windermere.

== Endurance Challenges ==
As part of her first major endurance challenge, in 2021 Boddy ran a marathon a day for seven days completing each of them in under four hours whilst raising over £30,000 for mental health charity, Mind.

In 2022, at the age of 22, Boddy became the youngest known female to run the length of Britain. Covering the distance between John O'Groats in the north of Scotland and Land's End in western Cornwall, she ran 40 miles (60 km) a day for 22 days straight.

In 2024, Boddy completed the UK's National Three Peaks challenge. As part of her effort, she climbed and ran between Ben Nevis in Scotland, Scafell Pike in England and Snowdon in Wales covering 442 miles (680 km). Having completed the challenge in just 6 days, 5 hours and 43 minutes, she was awarded the Guinness World Record for the fastest female time to complete the challenge.

In 2026, Boddy set the 350 mile female course record for the solo Los Angeles to Las Vegas Speed Project, completing the route in 77 hours and 54 minutes.

== Outreach and Engagement ==
Boddy is a regular contributor at events, festivals, schools and businesses, and frequently appears on podcasts. She shares candid insights into the challenges of ultra running, the resilience required, and the personal journey that drives her forward.
