= David Wood (judge) =

David Russell Wood (born 13 December 1948) is a retired British Circuit judge.

He was educated at Sedbergh School, the University of East Anglia (BA, 1970). He was called to the bar at Gray's Inn in 1973 and was a Circuit judge from 1995 to 2014. He served as President of the Council of Circuit Judges in 2008.
