= Nigel D. Oram =

Australian anthropologist (1919–2003)

Nigel Denis Oram
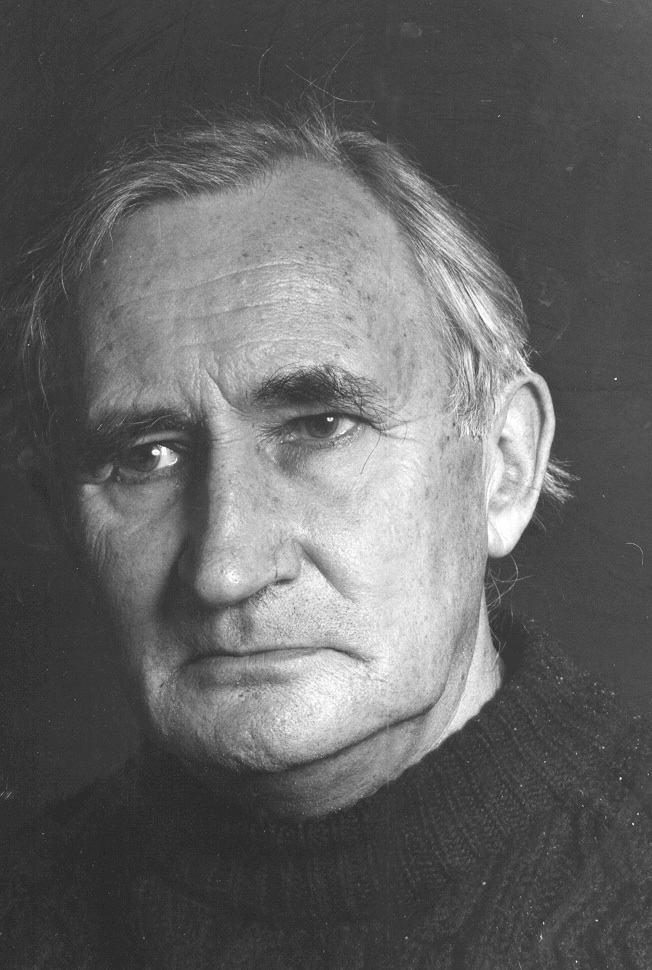
- Born: 25 December 1919; Maida Vale, London, Middlesex, England
- Died: 15 September 2003 (aged 83); Aranda, Australian Capital Territory, Australia
- Education: Oxford University
- Known for: Papuan oral history
- Spouse: Joan Airey Oram nee Bonsey
- Children: Denis Richard, Barbara Janet, Rosemary Joan
- Scientific career
- Fields: Anthropology
- Workplaces: New Guinea Research Unit Australian National University, La Trobe University

Nigel Denis Oram (25 December 1919 – 15 September 2003), was a British born public servant, academic, ethnologist and anthropologist specialising in the Pacific and New Guinea and was an acknowledged specialist in Papuan oral history. He has influenced a number of later researchers in the field of Papuan and New Guinean anthropology and history and along with Vanderwal, he also established the Prehistory department at La Trobe University in 1976 and the chair in Prehistory in 1980.

== Early life ==
Oram was born at Maida Vale, London, Middlesex, England, and lived in Buckinghamshire, Sydenham, and North Yorkshire. His parents were Denis Edwin Oram and Daisy Adeline Seaward. his father was an architect, but misfortunes reduced him to a clerkship in the Bank of England.

Oram was schooled at boarding schools – first at Gayhurst School in Buckinghamshire and was then "sent to a spartan school on the moors of northern Yorkshire", Sedbergh School. When his father died when he was 16, he won a scholarship to Oxford, but was recruited into the army in World War II. During the War, Oram was an officer in the Buffs (Royal East Kent Regiment) and Queen's Royal Regiment (West Surrey) and the Sixth Nigeria Regiment in West Africa. He served behind the Japanese lines in Burma with General Orde Wingate's Chindits. He commanded a reconnaissance unit of mainly Africans and Gurkhas with devocalised (non-braying) mules, then led a convoy of troops through middle India training for an foray into Malaya.

He met Joan Airey Bonsey, a sister in Queen Alexandra's Royal Army Nursing Corps en route to Africa during the war, and again in India and in 1944. They were married on 28 October 1944 at St Johns Church (Old Cathedral), in Calcutta India, and then returned to Oxford to read history in 1946. His son, Denis Richard was born on 16 August 1946 and his eldest daughter, Barbara Janet born on 8 July 1948 . He joined the British Colonial Service and was posted to Uganda in 1948. In 1951 he returned to Oxford University to undertake the 'Devonshire Course', an 18-month course in colonial history, administration and law under Marjory Perham. Returning to Uganda as colonial Secretary he had special responsibility for urban issues at the time of the Mau Mau rebellion, writing the relevant chapter for the 1952 East African Royal Commission on Land and Population and subsequently a book, "Towns in Africa". His youngest daughter, Rosemary Joan was born on 18 May 1952. He rose to Senior Assistant Secretary in Native Affairs before returning to England in 1958.

== Papua and New Guinea ==
In 1961, Oram obtained a position at the Australian National University and was sent to assist in the establishment of the New Guinea Research Unit at Port Moresby in 1962, as an offshoot of the university, where he examined the problem of urbanisation with assistants Lyn Barnett and Dawn Ryan. Oram's research assisted in developing understanding of the issues which would face New Guinea as a sovereign state when it ultimately obtained its independence from Australia. In particular he examined the problems of establishing land tenure, and leasehold administration.

Oram was consultant on urban local government to the South Pacific Commission in 1964, chairman of the Port Moresby Town Council Advisory Committee and in 1971 was elected to the first Port Moresby City Council, although having stood as Pangu Party nominee for president of the council, missed out by three votes to leading Papuan political Mr. Oala Oala-Rurua.

In 1969 he was appointed a fellow at the University of Papua New Guinea, where he remained until 1975, reaching the level of associate professor. His focus was the Hula people, who were located about 80 kilometres east of Port Moresby, and some of whom had migrated to a fringe settlement of Port Moresby. He learnt the Motu and Hula languages to assist his information gathering. and undertook his field work along the coast in a 35-foot long lakatoi canoe. Oram then returned to Australia to teach history at La Trobe University for nine years. He had expected to focus on teaching area of oral tradition, but came to head of a division of Prehistory with 90 students in the first year. Upon his retirement in 1985 he was appointed Honorary Senior Research Fellow.

== Final years ==
Oram remained in Canberra in his retirement, continuing to publish articles until shortly before his death at age 84 on 15 September 2003 at the Amity Nursing Home, Aranda, Australian Capital Territory. His personal papers are held at the National Library of Australia.

== Select publications ==
- Oram, N. D. (Nigel Denis) Colonial town to Melanesian city : Port Moresby, 1884–1974. University of Papua New Guinea, [S.l.], 2012.
- Langmore, John, Oram, N. D. (Nigel Denis), 1919–2003 and Australian National University. New Guinea Research Unit Port Moresby urban development. New Guinea Research Unit, Australian National University, Canberra, 1970.
- Oram, N. D. (Nigel Denis) Taurama : oral sources for a study of recent Motuan pre-history. New Guinea Research Unit, Australian National University, Canberra, 1968
- Oram, N. D. (Nigel Denis) & Australian National University. New Guinea Research Unit & Seminar on urbanisation in the Territory of Papua and New Guinea (1966?) (Canberra) (1966). Economic development and migration among the Hula. New Guinea Research Unit, Australian National University, [Canberra
- Oram, N. D. (Nigel Denis) & Australian National University. Pacific Manuscripts Bureau (1998). The mystery of Guise conflict between missionaries, colonial administrators and foreign traders during the British New Guinea Protectorate : a biography of Reginald Edward Guise.
