= James Rogers (cricketer) =

English cricketer & solicitor (born 1958)

Personal information
- Full name: James Julian Rogers
- Born: 20 August 1958 (age 68); Kendal, Westmorland, England
- Batting: Right-handed
- Bowling: Right-arm slow

Domestic team information
- Years: Team
- 1979–1981: Oxford University
- 1979: Cumberland

Career statistics
Competition	First-class
Matches	26
Runs scored	693
Batting average	16.50
100s/50s	0/2
Top score	54
Balls bowled	48
Wickets	1
Bowling average	39.00
5 wickets in innings	0
10 wickets in match	0
Best bowling	1/24
Catches/stumpings	7/–
- Source: Cricinfo, 13 January 2019

James Julian Rogers (born 20 August 1958) is an English solicitor and former first-class cricketer.

Born at Kendal, Rogers was educated at Sedbergh School, before going up to University College, Oxford to study modern history. While studying at Oxford he played first-class cricket for Oxford University, making his debut against Glamorgan at Oxford in 1979. He played first-class cricket for Oxford from 1979–1981, making a total of 26 appearances at first-class level. Rogers ended his first-class career having scored a total of 693 runs at an average of 16.50, with a highest score of 54. He also bowled eight overs with his slow bowling across his career, taking a single wicket and conceding 39 runs. In the same year he made his debut for Oxford, Rogers also made a single appearance in minor counties cricket for Cumberland against Durham at Millom in the Minor Counties Championship. After graduating from University College he became a solicitor.
