= Bryan Braithwaite-Exley =

English rugby union player

- Born: 30 November 1927 Wetherby, Leeds, Yorkshire
- Died: 29 May 2009 (aged 81) Yorkshire

Rugby union career
- Position: No. 8
International career
Years	Team	Apps	(Points)
1949	England	1	(0)

Bryan Braithwaite-Exley (30 November 1927 - 29 May 2009) was an English rugby union international.

Braithwaite-Exley, born in the town of Wetherby outside Leeds, was raised in Ilkley and educated at Sedbergh School. His family had a quarrying firm in Ingleton which he later worked for.

A number eight, Braithwaite-Exley played his rugby for Headingley and made 31 Yorkshire county appearances. He was capped once by England, against Wales at Cardiff Arms Park in the 1949 Five Nations.

Braithwaite-Exley served 50 years as chairman of Austwick Parish Council.

== See also ==
- List of England national rugby union players
