= Harold Cox (cricketer) =

English cricketer and soldier

Personal information
- Full name: Harold Ranyard Cox
- Born: 7 November 1884; Amritsar, Punjab, British India
- Died: 26 March 1962 (aged 77); Cheltenham, Gloucestershire, England
- Batting: Unknown
- Bowling: Unknown

Domestic team information
- Years: Team
- 1922/23: Europeans

Career statistics
Competition	First-class
Matches	1
Runs scored	33
Batting average	33.00
100s/50s	–/–
Top score	20*
Balls bowled	216
Wickets	2
Bowling average	42.00
5 wickets in innings	–
10 wickets in match	–
Best bowling	2/77
Catches/stumpings	–/–
- Source: ESPNcricinfo, 12 November 2023

Harold Ranyard Cox (7 November 1884 – 26 March 1962) was an English first-class cricketer, banker, and an officer in both the British Army and the British Indian Army.

The son of S. F. Cox, he was born in British India at Amritsar in November 1884. He was educated in England at Sedbergh School. Following the completion of his education, Cox was commissioned into the Worcestershire Regiment as a second lieutenant in April 1902. Prior to the First World War, he moved to India to become a banker with the Punjab Banking Company. Cox later served in the First World War with the British Indian Army as a second lieutenant, being granted his commission in October 1915, with promotion to lieutenant following in October 1916. Cox was attached to the 151st Punjabi Rifles during the war, holding the acting rank of captain for part of the war. Following the war, Cox made a single appearance in first-class cricket for the Europeans cricket team against the Parsees at Poona in the 1922–23 Bombay Quadrangular. Batting twice in the match, he ended the Europeans first innings not out on 20, while in their second innings he was dismissed for 13 runs by Bomanji Kalapesi. As a bowler, he took two wickets in the Parsees first innings, dismissing S. N. Gandhi and Sorabji Colah for the cost of 77 runs. Cox died in England at Cheltenham in March 1962.
