= Sedbergh School =

Public school in Cumbria, England

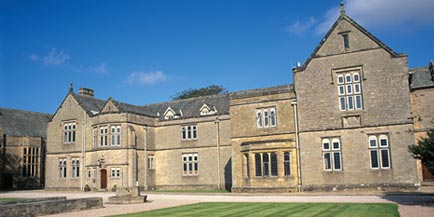
- The main building of Sedbergh School

Location
- Sedbergh, Cumbria, LA10 5HG; England; 54.32182°N 2.53153°W

Information
- Type: Public school Private day and boarding
- Motto: Dura Virum Nutrix (Latin: "A Stern Nurse of Men")
- Religious affiliation: Church of England
- Established: 1525; 501 years ago
- Founder: Roger Lupton
- Department for Education URN: 112451 Tables
- Headmaster: Daniel Harrison
- Gender: Mixed
- Age: 4 to 18
- Enrolment: 530 pupils
- Colour: Brown
- Alumni: Old Sedberghians
- Website: www.sedberghschool.org

Sedbergh School is a public school (English private boarding and day school) in the town of Sedbergh in Cumbria, North West England. It comprises a junior school for pupils aged 4 to 13 and the main school for 13 to 18 year olds. It was established in 1525.

== History ==
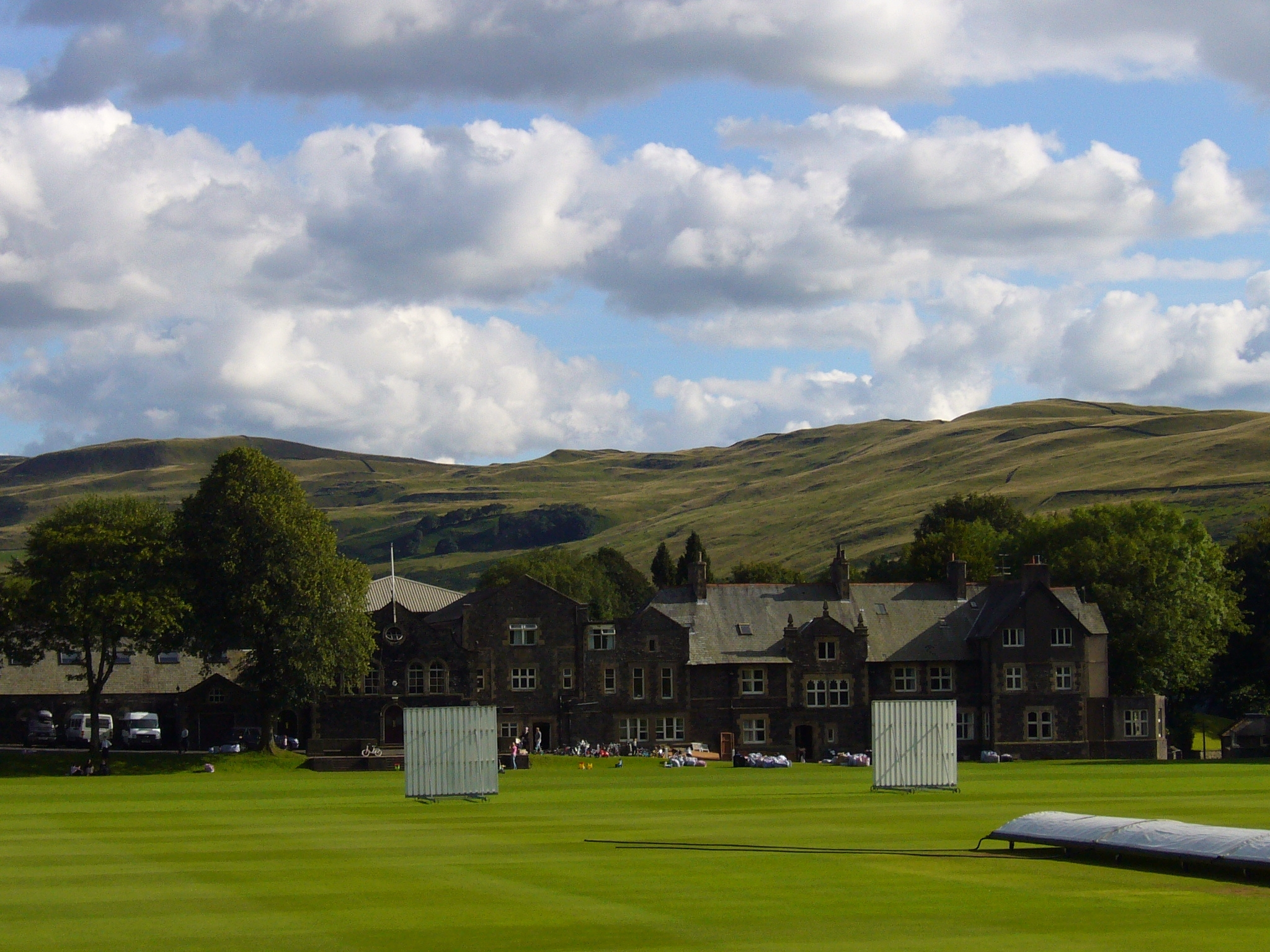
The school's playing field

Roger Lupton was born at Cautley in the parish of Sedbergh, Yorkshire, in 1456 and he provided for a Chantry School in Sedbergh in 1525 while he was Provost of Eton. By 1528, land had been bought, a school built, probably on the site of the present school library, and the foundation deed had been signed. Lupton's subsequent donations to the school's Sedbergh scholars of numerous scholarships and fellowships to St John's College, Cambridge succeeded in binding the school to St John's, and gave the Cambridge college power over the appointment of Sedbergh's Headmasters. Lupton's statutes state that if any of the last four of the St John's College scholarships are left vacant for a year, unless for a reason approved by the provost and fellows of King's College Cambridge, the lands are to revert to Lupton's next of kin. Lupton added that he was certain that St John's would not be found negligent in so pious a work. It was this link to St John's that probably saved Sedbergh in 1546–48 when most chantries were dissolved and their assets seized by Henry VIII's Commission.

Sedbergh was re-established and re-endowed as a grammar school in 1551 and the fortunes of the school in the coming centuries seem to have depended very much on the character and abilities of the headmasters with pupil numbers fluctuating and reaching as low a total as 8 day boys in the early 19th century.

One particularly successful period was during the Headship of John Harrison Evans (1838–61) who restored the prestige and achievements of the school and also funded the building of the Market Hall and Reading Room in the town. By 1857, the fellowships and scholarships which, since Lupton's time, had formed this link between the Sedbergh scholars and St John's College, ceased to be specially connected with Sedbergh. By 1860, the Lupton scholarships were combined and re-arranged under the name of the Lupton and Hebblethwaite Exhibitions.

A more independent Governing Body was established in 1874 in a successful bid to maintain Sedbergh's independence (amalgamation with Giggleswick had been suggested) and the first meeting took place in the Bull Inn in Sedbergh in December.

In the 1870s there was a tremendous amount of development and building work at Sedbergh, under the careful eye of the headmaster, Frederick Heppenstall. This included the Headmaster's House (now School House), classrooms, a chapel and four other boarding houses.

Henry George Hart took over as headmaster in 1880 and his tenure saw a new chapel built in 1897, the founding of the Old Sedberghian Club in 1897/98, the creation of the prefectorial system, the inaugural Wilson run and the confirmation of the school motto "Dura Virum Nutrix" (Stern Nurse of Men).

In 1930, an inquest into the death of a 14-year-old schoolboy from Sedbergh School (then in West Yorkshire) heard that, rather than returning after holidays, he took his life because of his dislike of the fagging system. The jury returned a verdict of suicide and recommended the discontinuation of the practice in public schools.

In 1989 the number of boys in the school exceeded 500 for the first time, during the headship of Dr R G Baxter. Two years later a new coat of arms was granted to the school and it was visited by the Queen and the Duke of Edinburgh.

In 2005 the school was one of fifty of the country's leading independent schools which were found guilty of running an illegal price-fixing cartel which had allowed them to drive up fees for thousands of parents. Each school was required to pay a nominal penalty of £10,000 and all agreed to make ex-gratia payments totalling £3 million into a trust designed to benefit pupils who attended the schools during the period in respect of which fee information was shared.

The governing body decided to open the school to girls in 1999 and the first girls were admitted in 2001. While the pupils are still predominantly boys, the number of girls attending has increased dramatically since the move into coeducation. The previous headmaster, Christopher Hirst, brought in the change to co-educational schooling from single-sex.

In January 2009 the Junior School moved from Bentham to join the senior school in Sedbergh. The Junior School has accommodation for both day and boarding boys and girls aged 3–13. On 26 February 2013, it was announced that the school would merge with Casterton School.

Despite its long history, The Good Schools Guide notes how "Sedbergh has faced up to the demands of the 21st century but managed to retain traditional values and ethos. Its increasing numbers indicate parents very much approve. It rightly retains its formidable reputation on the sports field but away from it, provides a happy and caring environment for all its pupils regardless of ability or sports prowess."

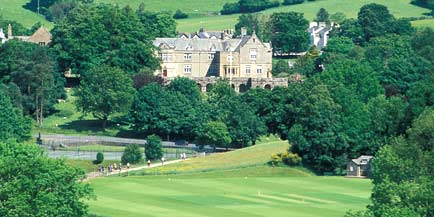
Sedbergh School from the fells

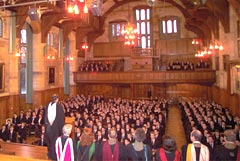
Assembly in Powell Hall

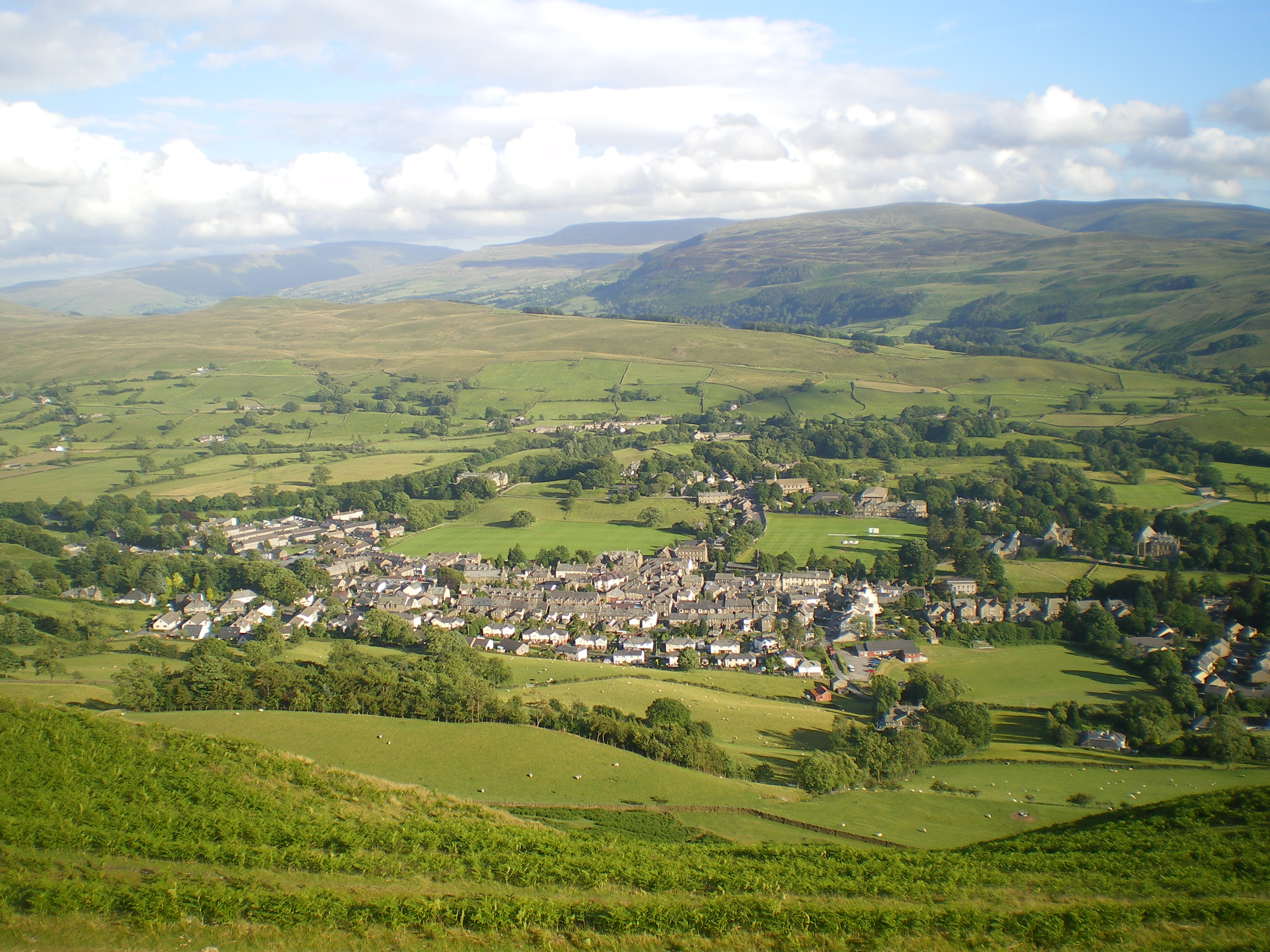
Sedbergh from Winder

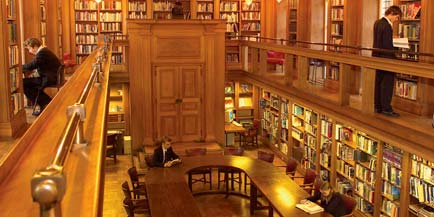
Sedbergh School Library

== Junior School ==
Sedbergh Junior School

Information
- Type: Preparatory day and boarding
- Established: 2002
- Department for Education URN: 121739 Tables
- Headmaster: Will Newman
- Gender: co-educational
- Age: 4 to 13
- Enrollment: 200
- Houses: 2
- Website: sedberghschool.org/prep/

The junior school was opened in 2002. It was previously located on the site of the former Bentham Grammar School after it was closed and Sedbergh took over its premises. In 2009 it moved to a site next to the main school. The school relocated again in September 2013 to the site of the former Casterton School for girls and is now known as Casterton, Sedbergh Preparatory School. Casterton was absorbed into Sedbergh, with senior girls transferring to the main school and junior pupils remaining at the Casterton campus. Boarding is offered to Junior School pupils aged 8 and above.

== Rong Qiao Sedbergh School ==
Opened in 2018, Sedbergh's international school, Rong Qiao Sedbergh School is located in Fuzhou, Fujian Province, China. It is a partnership between Sedbergh School and the Rong Qiao Group. Offering education for children from the ages of 3 to 18, its ethos draws on both English and Chinese teaching practice. 10% of students are international students, and 90% are Chinese nationals.

== House system ==
Like most traditional public schools, the house system is incorporated with the boarding programme and most pupils are boarders. Most pupils at Sedbergh live in a boarding house, of which there are nine (six for boys, three for girls) chosen when applying to the school. It is here that he or she and takes their daily meals. Day pupils are fully integrated into the programme and participate in activities. Houses compete amongst one another in school competitions such as debating, academic challenge (a University Challenge-style quiz) and 'House Unison' (a traditional singing competition), and in particular in sporting competitions, for example the seriously contested Senior Seniors (Inter-House rugby) and the Wilson Run. Houses are named mostly after illustrious Old Sedberghians or Headmasters.

Sedbergh Junior School, now Casterton, Sedbergh Preparatory School, in Casterton, near Kirkby Lonsdale, also has Cressbrook House for boarding boys and Beale for boarding girls.

=== Senior houses ===
House	Gender	Colour	Emblem
Evans	Boys	Yellow	Wasp
Hart	Boys	Green	Jay
Powell	Boys	Pink	Chameleon
School	Boys	Blue	Kingfisher
Sedgwick	Boys	Red	Rouge et Noir
Winder	Boys	Purple	Mole
Lupton	Girls	White/Black	Wolf
Robertson	Girls	Turquoise	Butterfly
Carus	Girls	Red/Blue	Eagle

=== Junior houses ===
- Cressbrook House (boys)
- Beale House (girls)
- Thornfield House (Senior prep school girls)

== Extracurricular activities ==
=== Clubs and societies ===
Sedbergh offers outdoor pursuits as well as academic societies, including 'The Headmaster's Society' which is for Academic Scholars in the Sixth Form and chaired by the Headmaster. It is a forum for debate and discussion of major topical issues based upon papers delivered by the pupils and it also hosts talks given by intellectuals and public figures. The junior academic society is known as the 'Phoenix Society'.

Sedbergh's other academic club is the Dinner Debating Society which meets twice termly for black-tie 'dinner debates' hosted by Housemasters.

Sedbergh's has an Outdoor Pursuits Club. Activities organised in the local area by the club include climbing, gill scrambling and pot-holing as well as mountain biking and fell walking.

=== Sport ===
Sedbergh has a sporting tradition. Many Old Sedberghians have national caps and international tournament experience or have represented the school at county or national level.

Sedbergh is renowned for producing rugby football players, including the England captains Wavell Wakefield, John Spencer and Will Carling, and the world cup winner Will Greenwood. Sedbergh is represented in the Rugby Union Guinness Premiership at the time of writing by seven players at first or second team level in four different clubs. In November 2010 the school rugby team was named "School Team of the Year" at the Aviva Daily Telegraph School Sport Matters Awards after going the entire previous season undefeated.

The school has hosted Cumberland and Minor Counties cricket matches on several occasions. In 2019, Lancashire County Cricket Club played their County Championship match against Durham at Sedbergh School. They also faced Essex there in 2023.

In 2012 their sailing team competed in the Southport 12 Hour Race, coming 56th out of 57 boats sailing an Enterprise.

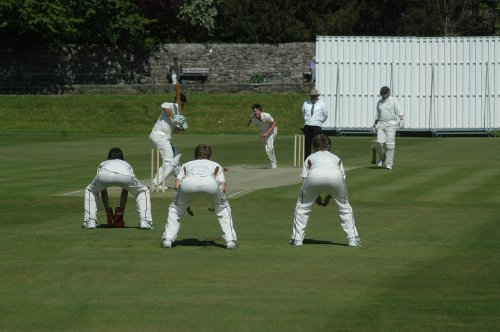
Sedbergh School Cricket Club vs MCC

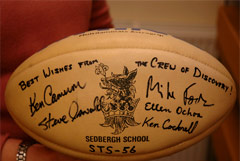
Sedbergh School rugby ball taken into space by the crew of Discovery for the STS-56 mission

==== Anti-Assassins Rugby Club ====
The Anti-Assassins Rugby Club (A-As) was founded in 1950 when Sedbergh Old Boys were invited to pick a Northern team to play against the masters and Old Boys (The Assassins) of Sedbergh School. Now this invitational team plays as SpoonAAs (Spoon Anti-Assassins) as it raises funds for the Wooden Spoon charity.

== Buildings and features ==
=== Chapel ===
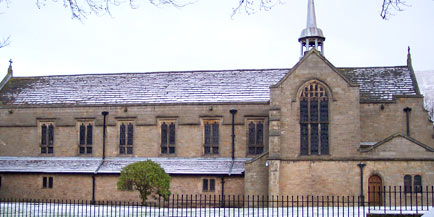
Sedbergh School Chapel

This was built in Perpendicular style in 1895–97, and was designed by the Lancaster architects Austin and Paley.

=== Chapel organ ===
The school took delivery of a custom built, four manual organ console in November 2015, which replaced an organ that was acquired from the Church of St. Mary Magdalene, Hucknall. This two manual instrument had been built by Nigel Church and moved to the school by David Wells in 1994. The instrument can now be found in a church in Lincolnshire.

=== War cloisters ===
The cloisters at Sedbergh are a monument to old boys and masters of the school killed during the Great War and the Second World War. The cloisters were dedicated in 1924 and then re-dedicated after the Second World War. The cloisters were restored and partially rebuilt in 2005 and on Remembrance Day again re-dedicated after an appeal had raised over £130,000 for the necessary work.

The school also has a separate memorial for Old Sedberghians awarded the Victoria Cross, of which there are four. Brigadier Jock Campbell who won the Military Cross in the First World War and the Victoria Cross at the battle of Sidi Rezegh in the Second and was a member of Evans House. Three of the Old Sedberghian winners of the Victoria Cross were Old Sedgwickians, RJT Digby-Jones at Wagon Hill in 1900 in the Boer War, George Ward Gunn at Sidi Rezegh in 1941 and Kenneth Campbell over Brest Harbour, also in 1941.

Four Battle of Britain pilots attended the school. Pilot Officer Desmond Kay DFC & Bar, Pilot Officer Noel Benson were killed during the war, but Flt Lt Kenneth Stoddart AE, and Flying Officer Alec Worthington survived.

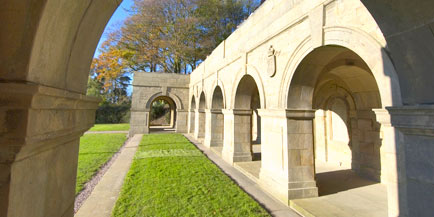
Sedbergh School Cloisters

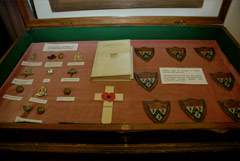
Replica George and Victoria Crosses won by Sedberghians

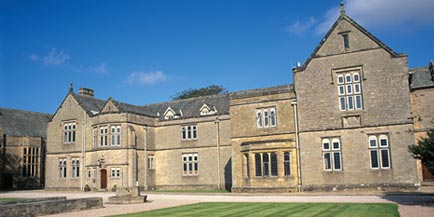
'Main School' from the top of the cloisters

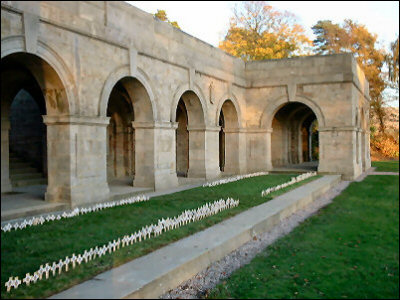
Sedbergh School Cloisters

== Headmasters ==
- 1525–1543 Henry Blomeyr
- 1544–1570 Robert Hebblethwaite
- 1585–1623 John Mayer (O.S.)
- 1623–1646 Gilbert Nelson
- 1646–1648 Richard Garthwayte (O.S.)
- 1648–1656 Richard Jackson
- 1657–1662 James Buchanan
- 1662–1674 Edward Fell (O.S.)
- 1674–1706 Posthumus Wharton
- 1706–1709 Thomas Dwyer
- 1709–1741 Dr. Samuel Saunders
- 1742–1746 William Broxholme
- 1746–1782 Wynne Bateman (O.S.)
- 1782–1799 Christopher Hull (O.S.)
- 1799–1819 William Stevens
- 1819–1838 Henry Wilkinson
- 1838 Hartley Coleridge
- 1838–1861 Rev. John Harrison Evans
- 1861–1874 Henry George Day
- 1875–1879 Rev. Frederick H. Heppenstall
- 1880–1900 Henry George Hart
- 1900–1907 Charles Lowry
- 1907–1912 Frederic Blagden Malim
- 1912–1926 William Nassau Weech
- 1927–1936 G. B. Smith
- 1937–1954 John Harold Bruce Lockhart (O.S.)
- 1954–1975 Gervase Michael Cobham Thornely
- 1975–1982 Peter J. Attenborough
- 1982–1995 Roger George Baxter
- 1995–2010 Christopher Halliwell Hirst
- 2010–2018 Andrew P. Fleck
- 2018– Daniel J. Harrison

== Notable alumni ==
=== Military ===
- Gemmell Alexander OBE, British colonial officer and co-operator
- Major General Henry Templer Alexander CB CBE DSO, Army Commander
- Lt-Colonel John William Balfour Paul, DSO, Scottish Officer of Arms
- Randle Barnett Barker, decorated British Army Officer
- Percy Bentley, one of four soldiers to be awarded the Military Cross four times
- Major General "Jock" Campbell VC DSO and Bar MC, a commander of the 7th Armoured Division and recipient of the Victoria Cross
- Flying Officer Kenneth Campbell VC, Royal Air Force pilot and recipient of the Victoria Cross
- General Sir Robert Archibald Cassels, GCB GCSI DSO, Indian Army officer
- Colonel Freddie Spencer Chapman DSO and Bar ED, naturalist, mountaineer, explorer, war hero
- Group Captain Walter Myers Churchill DSO DFC, Royal Air Force, Second World War
- Brigadier Harry Kenneth Dimoline, CBE, DSO, TD, CPM, Commander at the Battle of Monte Cassino. Mentioned in despatches.
- Lieutenant Robert James Thomas Digby-Jones VC, Royal Engineers Officer and recipient of the Victoria Cross
- Air Vice-Marshal Peter Furniss, DFC, Royal Air Force
- Lieutenant-General Sir Andrew Richard Gregory KBE CB, British Army officer
- Second Lieutenant George Ward Gunn VC MC, Royal Horse Artillery Officer and recipient of the Victoria Cross
- Brigadier Alastair "Jock" Stevenson Pearson, CB, DSO & Three Bars, OBE, MC, TD, DL, Second World War hero
- Air Commodore Duncan le Geyt Pitcher CMG, CBE, DSO, RAF, Army and Royal Air Force
- Major David F. O. Russell MC FRSE, 20th century businessman, philanthropist and noted war hero
- Major-General Jonathan David Shaw CB CBE, British Army officer and Assistant Chief of Defence Staff
- Admiral Sir Jock Slater GCB LVO DL, First Sea Lord and Chief of Naval Staff
- General Sir John Stuart Mackenzie Shea GCB KCMG DSO, British Army officer
- Wing Commander Sir Kenneth Stoddart KCVO KStJ AE JP LLD, Battle of Britain pilot
- Major General Michael Walsh CB DSO, British Army Officer and Chief Scout

=== Politics and law ===
- Henry Aglionby Aglionby, British barrister and Whig politician
- William George Ainslie, ironmaster and MP for North Lonsdale 1885–1892
- Glencairn Balfour Paul CMG, British Ambassador to Iraq, Jordan and Tunisia
- Thomas Bingham, Baron Bingham of Cornhill, Senior Law Lord, former Master of the Rolls and Lord Chief Justice
- Brendan Bracken, 1st Viscount Bracken, Politician, businessman and associate of Winston Churchill
- Henry Broadley, British Conservative politician
- Sandy Bruce-Lockhart, Baron Bruce-Lockhart, OBE, Chairman of the Local Government Association
- Bill Carritt, Communist revolutionary, Carritt family member, college lecturer, humanitarian aid organiser, campaigner for the Scottsboro Boys
- Noel Carritt, Communist revolutionary, Carritt family member, International Brigadier, head of biology at Dr Challoner's Grammar School
- Michael Carritt, Communist revolutionary, Carritt family member, anti-colonial spy, expert on Indian politics, philosophy lecturer at Oxford University
- Sir John Seton Cassels, English civil servant and educationalist
- Sir Alan Chambré, English judge
- Sir Hugh Cortazzi, Author, diplomat and prominent Japanologist
- Sir Maurice Dorman, Governor-General of Sierra Leone and Colonial Governor of Malta
- Richard Bostock Dorman CBE, Diplomat and High Commissioner
- Professor Sir David Alexander Ogilvy Edward, Scottish lawyer and academic, and former Judge of the Court of Justice of the European Communities
- Edward John Eyre, Explorer and Governor of Jamaica.
- Sir Russell Fairgrieve, politician
- Sir John Archibald Ford, British Ambassador to Indonesia
- Sir Michael Bowen Hanley KCB, Head of MI5
- Baron Haskel of Higher Broughton, Labour Party politician
- Laurence Helsby, Baron Helsby, Head of British Civil Service
- H. Montgomery Hyde, author and politician
- James Bruce Lockhart, British diplomat, intelligence officer, author, and artist
- John Lowther, 1st Viscount Lonsdale, First Lord of the Treasury and Lord Privy Seal
- James Lupton, Baron Lupton, Conservative peer
- Count Andrew McMillan, Baron of Cleghorn, philanthropist
- James MacColl, politician
- Sir Richard McCombe, Lord Justice of Appeal
- Brian McConnell, Baron McConnell, Northern Ireland politician and member of the House of Lords
- Sir John Middleton, Governor of The Falkland Islands
- Peter Moore, East India Company and Member of Parliament
- Stephen O'Brien, Conservative Party Member of Parliament
- Joseph Anthony Peacocke, Inspector-General of the Royal Ulster Constabulary
- Charles Peat, Politician and Principal Private Secretary to Winston Churchill
- Sir Francis Powell, 1st Baronet, Conservative Party Member of Parliament
- Sir Robert Rhodes James, politician and author
- Arthur Ridehalgh, Attorney General of Hong Kong
- James Hugh Robertson, Political and economic thinker and activist
- Robert Rowland, Member European Parliament South East England The Brexit Party
- Sir Michael Alexander Geddes Sachs, First English solicitor appointed as a High Court judge
- Sir Giles Shaw, Politician. wrote his memoir, 'In the Long Run' published by the Memoir Club
- Michael Shaw, Baron Shaw of Northstead, Politician
- Norman Lockhart Smith, Acting Administrator of Hong Kong
- Sir Thomas Broun Smith (1915–1988), QC FBA FRSE etc, Scots jurist and Professor of Law
- Joseph Stanley Snowden, British Liberal Party politician and barrister
- John Studholme, British pioneer of New Zealand, farmer and politician
- David Waddington, Baron Waddington, British Home Secretary, Lord Privy Seal, Leader of the House of Lords, Governor of Bermuda.
- Robert Warnock, Circuit judge
- David Wood, Circuit judge

=== Business ===
- Montague Ainslie, Forester and businessman
- Adam Applegarth, Ex-CEO of Northern Rock bank
- Philip Hedley Bowcock, CEO of William Hill Plc
- Christian Bjelland, Norwegian businessman and chairman of the National Gallery of Norway
- Sir Christopher Bland, chairman of B.T. Group, businessman and former chairman of the BBC
- John Charlesworth Dodgson-Charlesworth, colliery owner and M.P.
- Sir Roger Gifford, banker, Alderman and Lord Mayor of London
- Sir Mark Hudson, former chairman of the Council of the Duchy of Lancaster
- James Lupton, Lord Lupton of Lovington, banker, trustee of the British Museum
- Nigel Rich, former managing director of Jardine Matheson Holdings in Hong Kong
- Sir (John) Hubert Worthington, English architect, designed Sedbergh School's memorial cloisters

=== The arts, literature and humanities ===
- Michael Adams, journalist
- John Arden, dramatist
- Greig Barr, Fellow and Rector of Exeter College, Oxford
- Sir John Christopher Malcolm Baynes, 7th Bt., author
- Simon Beaufoy, Screenwriter and 2009 Oscar winner for Slumdog Millionaire. Wrote The Full Monty.
- Leonard Boden, Scottish portrait painter
- Ben Birdsall, Writer and artist
- Timothy Birdsall, Cartoonist
- Colin Blakely, British character actor
- JB Blanc, British film actor
- Peter Chippindale, Journalist and author
- William George Clark, English classical and Shakespearean scholar
- Henry Wilkinson Cookson, Master of Peterhouse, Cambridge, and five times Vice-Chancellor of Cambridge
- William Craven, Master of St. John's College, Cambridge, and Vice-Chancellor of Cambridge
- Ernest Crawley, English schoolmaster, sexologist, anthropologist, sports journalist and exponent of ball games
- Hugh I'Anson Fausset, Literary critic, biographer, poet and religious writer
- Arthur Foxton Ferguson, English baritone, lecturer and German translator
- Richard Fraser, (born Richard Mackie Simpson), Scottish actor
- Assheton Gorton, Production designer and Academy Award nominee
- Mark Herman, film director and screenwriter|
- Ashley James, Broadcaster, DJ, author, and feminist campaigner
- Tim Kevan, English writer and barrister
- Francis Llewellyn Griffith, British Egyptologist
- Rab Bruce Lockhart, Scottish educationist and rugby union player
- Dugald Bruce Lockhart, Anglo-Scottish stage and screen actor, director and writer
- Phillip Mason, author
- Alan Macfarlane, Professor Emeritus of Anthropology, King's College, Cambridge
- Colin Matthew, historian and the first editor of the Oxford Dictionary of National Biography
- Fergus McDonell, film editor and director
- Jim Muir, BBC Middle East correspondent
- Nigel D. Oram, public servant, military officer and anthropologist
- Barry Pain, journalist, poet and writer
- George Edwards Peacock, eminent Australian colonial artist
- Adam Rickitt, actor, singer, model and one time Conservative parliamentary candidate
- F. A. Ridley, historian and Marxist
- Simon Slater, musician and TV and film actor
- Richard Smyth, English school headmaster and cricketer.
- Sir Archibald Strong, Australian scholar and poet
- Richard Suart, Opera singer and actor
- Edward Tatham, Rector of Lincoln College, Oxford
- Mark Umbers, actor - theatre and film
- Roger Vignoles, piano accompanist
- James Walker né Chalton, member of the Royal Shakespeare Company and screen actor
- John Dawson Watson, British painter and illustrator
- James Wilby, actor
- Thomas Wilson, English cleric and eminent headmaster
- William John Woodhouse, classical scholar and author
- Tyson Yoshi, a Hong Kong singer
- Henry Watson Fowler, former teacher at the school, the writer of A Dictionary of Modern English Usage

=== Science and exploration ===
- Peter Addyman, British archaeologist
- Wilfred Eade Agar, Anglo-Australian zoologist
- Anthony Askew, Physician and book collector
- Peter Barwick, English physician and author
- George Birkbeck, doctor, academic, philanthropist and early pioneer in adult education
- Miles Bland, fellow of the Royal Society, of the Society of Antiquaries of London, and of the Royal Astronomical Society.
- Professor Sir Christopher Booth, Clinician and medical historian
- Christopher Chippindale, Stonehenge archaeologist
- John Cranke, mathematician and mentor
- Dr Leslie Bennet Craigie Cunningham FRSE OBE, Scottish statistician and physicist
- John Dawson, surgeon and mathematician
- G. M. B. Dobson, Fellow of the Royal Society and President of the Royal Meteorological Society
- Anthony Fothergill, Physician
- John Fothergill, Physician, plant collector, philanthropist
- Thomas Garnett, English physician and natural philosopher
- Thomas Gaskin, Clergyman and academic, now known for contributions to mathematics
- John Hammersley, British mathematician
- John Haygarth, physician who discovered the benefits of segregating/quarantining sick patients
- Thomas S. Hele, Cambridge Biochemist and Academic
- Edward Holme, English physician and supporter of learned societies
- John Hymers, English mathematician, Fellow of the Royal Society and founder of Hymers College
- John Walter Guerrier Lund, CBE FRS, English psychologist
- John McCormick, Emeritus Professor of Political Science
- Dr Digby McLaren, Geologist and palaeontologist
- Sir Roderick McQuhae Mackenzie of Scatwell, 12th Bt., Fellow of the Royal College of Physicians
- Edward Max Nicholson, Founder of the World Wildlife Fund
- George Peacock, English mathematician
- Sir Isaac Pennington, Physician
- James Hogarth Pringle, Pioneer in surgical practice
- Adam Sedgwick, Founder of modern geology
- Edmund Sharpe, Architect and engineer
- George Sherriff OBE, Scottish explorer and plant collector
- Robert Swan OBE, Polar explorer: the first man in history to walk to both the North and South Poles
- Roger Cuthbert Wakefield, Surveyor
- Robert Willan, the father of modern dermatology
- Mark Alexander Wynter-Blyth, Lepidopterist and schoolmaster
- Professor Ian Young OBE, Engineering innovator in medicine

=== Sport ===
- Tom Aspinwall, Lancashire County Cricketer
- David Barnes, Chairman of the Professional Rugby Players' Association
- John Barnsdale, first class cricketer and Nottingham Forest footballer
- Alastair Biggar, Scotland rugby union player, also British and Irish Lions and Barbarians
- Mike Biggar, Scotland rugby union player
- Imogen Boddy, world record ultra-marathon runner
- James Botham, Wales rugby union player
- Bryan Braithwaite-Exley, England rugby union player
- Nicola Bozzo, Italian rugby union player
- Harry Brook, England cricketer - won the 2022 T20 World Cup. Captain of the T20 and ODI teams since 2024.
- John H Bruce Lockhart, Scottish cricketer, rugby international and headmaster
- Kim Bruce-Lockhart, Scotland international squash player
- Logie Bruce Lockhart, Scotland rugby union player and headmaster of Gresham's School
- Will Carling OBE, England rugby union captain
- Jordan Clark, Professional cricketer - fifth ever to score six sixes in an over
- Harold Cox, cricketer
- Simon Cross rugby union
- Arthur Dorward, Scotland rugby union captain
- Ewan Dowes rugby league
- Phil Dowson England rugby union player
- Rob Elloway, German rugby union international
- Carl Fearns, rugby union
- Tomas Francis, Wales rugby union international
- Mahika Gaur, England cricket international
- Will Greenwood MBE, England rugby union player
- Jamie Harrison, cricketer
- George Hill, Yorkshire County Cricket Club Cricketer
- Kane James, Rugby Union player
- Peter Kininmonth, Scotland rugby union captain
- Mike McCarthy Ireland rugby union international
- Mandy Mitchell-Innes, England cricketer
- James Park-Johnson, first-class cricketer
- Cameron Redpath, Scotland international rugby union player
- Ben Redshaw, rugby union player
- Matt Revis, England County Cricketer
- Bevan Rodd, England Rugby Union player
- James Rogers, first-class cricketer
- Chris Sanders, first-class cricketer
- Roger Sangwin, England Rugby player
- Angus Scott, Olympian
- Archie Scott, Scottish first-class cricketer; oldest ever living Scottish first-class cricketer
- James Simpson-Daniel England rugby union player
- Robert Skene, first-class cricketer
- John Spencer, England rugby union captain
- David Tait, rugby union
- Freddie Tait, golfer
- Wavell Wakefield, 1st Baron Wakefield of Kendal England rugby union captain
- Abbie Ward née Scott, England rugby union player
- Gerald Lloyd Williams (1881–1936) – Rugby union half-back and member of the 1908 British Lions tour to New Zealand and Australia

=== Religion ===
- Nicholas John Willoughby Barker, British Anglican priest
- John Barwick, Royalist churchman and Dean of St. Paul's Cathedral
- Francis Blackburne, Archdeacon
- James Bland, English Anglican priest in Ireland
- Henry Lowther Clarke, first Archbishop of Melbourne
- Ingram Cleasby, Dean of Chester
- Robert Dawson, Anglican bishop in Ireland in the 17th century
- John Duckett, Catholic priest and martyr
- Sir George Fleming, Bishop of Carlisle
- John Hey, English cleric and the first Norrisian Professor of Theology at Cambridge.
- Walker King, Bishop of Rochester
- Thomas Kipling, Early churchman and academic
- John Knewstub, eminent English clergyman
- Christopher Charles Luxmoore, Bishop of Bermuda
- William Stuart MacPherson, Dean of Lichfield
- George Mason, Bishop of The Isle of Man
- Christopher John Mayfield, Bishop of Wolverhampton and Bishop of Manchester
- Arnold Mathew, founder and first bishop of the Old Roman Catholic Church in the United Kingdom
- Rt. Rev. Thomas Otway, Seventeenth century Anglican bishop in Ireland
- Richard Parkinson, Canon of Manchester Cathedral, college principal, theologian and antiquarian
- Michael Peck, Dean of Lincoln
- Reginald Richard Roseveare, Anglican bishop
- Thomas Stackhouse, English theologian and controversialist
- James Wilson, Theologian and astronomer
- Tom Wright, Bishop of Durham and a leading British New Testament scholar.
