= William John Woodhouse =

William John Woodhouse (7 November 1866 – 26 October 1937) was a classical scholar and author, professor of Greek at the University of Sydney.

== Early life ==
Woodhouse was born at Clifton, Westmorland, England, the son of Richard Woodhouse, a station master, and his wife Mary, née Titterington. He was educated at Sedbergh School, Yorkshire. Woodhouse won an open exhibition to Queen's College, Oxford, (B.A., 1889; M.A., 1895).

In 1897 Woodhouse was appointed lecturer in classics at the University College of North Wales, Bangor; on 28 March 1897 at the parish church, Sedbergh, Yorkshire, he married Eleanor Emma Jackson. In 1900 Woodhouse was appointed lecturer in ancient history and political philosophy at the University of St Andrews, Scotland.

== Career in Australia ==
Woodhouse became professor of Greek at the University of Sydney in 1901, succeeding Walter Scott and held the chair until his death. In 1908 he travelled back to Greece and laid the foundation for a collection of casts of sculpture for the Museum.

== Late life and legacy ==
Woodhouse's last book, Solon the Liberator, a Study of the Agrarian problem in Attika in the Seventh Century (published posthumously, 1938) was completed just before his death. Other books were left unfinished.

Woodhouse died of cancer in Gordon, Sydney on 26 October 1937.
