= Philip Bowcock =

English accountant (born 1968)

- Born: 15 April 1968 (age 57)
- Education: Sedbergh School
- Occupation: Accountant

Philip Hedley Bowcock (born 15 April 1968) was educated at Sedbergh School and was the chief executive of the bookmakers William Hill. He was previously chief financial officer of the company and before that CFO of Cineworld from 2011 to 2015.
