= Robert Warnock (judge) =

British Circuit judge (born 1953)

Alastair Robert Lyon Warnock (born 23 July 1953) is a British Circuit judge.

He was educated at Sedbergh School, the University of East Anglia (BA History, 1974), and the College of Law.

He was called to the bar at Lincoln's Inn in 1977 and was made a Circuit judge in 2003. He has been a Senior Judge of the Sovereign Base Areas since 2012.
