= Gemmell Alexander =

British colonial officer and cooperative expert (1918–2014)

Gemmell Alexander MBE
- Born: William Gemmell Alexander; 19 August 1918; Hooton, Cheshire, England
- Died: 10 June 2014 (aged 95)
- Education: Sedbergh School; Brasenose College, Oxford
- Movement: Co-operative
- Spouse: Rona Page Elias
- Children: 5

William Gemmell Alexander MBE (19 August 1918 – 10 June 2014) was a British military officer, colonial officer, and co-operative and safety expert.

After reading law at Oxford University, he served as a 2nd Lieutenant in the 5th Army Division during World War II. He served in France, Africa and Italy, and was present at the capture of the Belsen concentration camp. He was awarded the MBE (Military), and was twice mentioned in despatches.

As a member of the Colonial Service, he served in the Gilbert and Ellice Islands (now known as Kiribati and Tuvalu), Mauritius and Cyprus, helping to develop co-operatives.

He was director of the International Co-operative Alliance from 1963 to 1968.

Alexander joined expeditions to Lapland, the Cayman Islands and Iceland. He "cheated death" a number of times and later became the director general of the Royal Society for the Prevention of Accidents.
