= John Haygarth =

British physician (1740–1827)

John Haygarth FRS FRSE (1740 – 10 June 1827) was an 18th-century British physician who discovered new ways to prevent the spread of fever among patients and reduce the mortality rate of smallpox.

== Life ==
Haygarth was born to William Haygarth and Magdalen Metcalfe at Garsdale, near Sedbergh, West Riding of Yorkshire, in a house where his grandparents' initials can still be seen above the door. He attended Sedbergh School and was tutored by John Dawson, a fellow Sedberghian and a surgeon and mathematician. He attended St. John's College, Cambridge from 1759 to 1766. Haygarth matriculated at the University of Edinburgh Medical School in 1762 studying medicine for three years and leaving without a degree in 1765. After a studying medicine briefly at the University of Leiden and in London, he took his MB degree from the University of Cambridge in 1766 after which he was appointed physician to Chester Infirmary in 1766. A decade later he married Sarah Vere Widdons on 23 January 1776; together they had four daughters and two sons. Haygarth's descendants now reside in Perth, Australia.

== Medicine ==
Haygarth spent 30 years at Chester and became known as one of the best physicians of his time. Like William Cullen, James Currie and Thomas Percival, he was interested in a wide array of medical and social justice issues. He was particularly interested in the treatment of fever patients and the prevention of smallpox. Although he was an Anglican, Haygarth was supported by a network of Dissenting men of science and letters who helped spread his ideas. In 1774, as part of a census he administered in Chester, he asked residents about their medical history. From this information he concluded that fever patients should be separated from others and his discovery that only a tiny fraction of the population of Chester had never had smallpox led him to focus his energy on prevention. He wrote up these findings in a paper, Observations on the Population and Diseases of Chester.

In 1778 Haygarth helped found the Smallpox Society of Chester; the group advocated inoculation, an unpopular position at the time, and tried to educate the populace so as to avoid casual contraction of the disease. Only four years after this effort began, Chester's smallpox mortality rate had been reduced by almost 50%. Soon other towns, such as Leeds and Liverpool, adopted the Society's methods. They were assisted by his Inquiry how to Prevent the Small Pox (1784) which included statistical calculations supported by John Dawson. The book was translated into French and German and made Haygarth an internationally known figure. He further elaborated his ideas in Sketch of a plan to exterminate the casual small pox from Great Britain and to introduce general inoculation (1793). Unfortunately, his plan to inspect homes and provide general inoculation was resisted in the increasingly conservative 1790s. For his important work on smallpox, Haygarth was elected as a Fellow of the Royal Society in 1781.

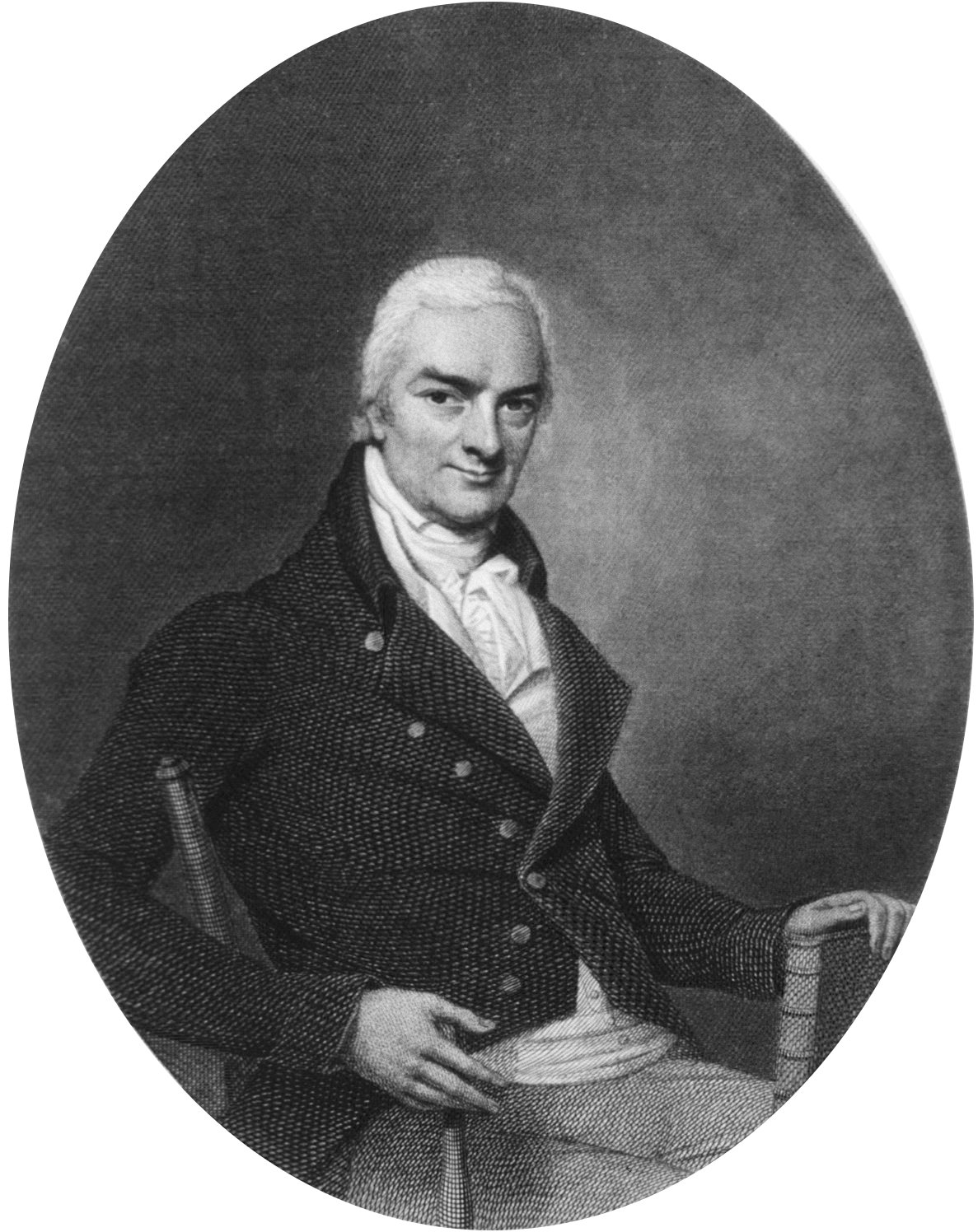
John Haygarth

Haygarth did not abandon his research into fever patients, however. He performed several experiments and determined that separating fever patients within a hospital reduced mortality rates. When his plan was put into effect in Chester in 1783, the first fever wards in Britain, all except one of the 30 fever patients recovered. The following year, his precautions helped to stop the spread of typhus in the town. He was elected a Foreign Honorary Member of the American Academy of Arts and Sciences in 1789.

In 1798 Haygarth moved to Bath and continued his research. After analyzing his records from Chester, he published a treatise on rheumatic fever and on gout. He continued publishing medical papers in the journal of the Royal Society, Philosophical Transactions. Haygarth also promoted free, universal education, a position he supported in his Letter to Bishop Porteous (1812). He also helped found banks that would allow people to save money more efficiently and safely.

== Perkins' tractors ==
In 1799, Haygarth investigated the efficacy of medical instruments called "Perkins tractors". These were metal pointers which were supposedly able to "draw out" disease. They were sold at the extremely high price of five guineas, and Haygarth set out to show that the high cost was unnecessary. He did this by comparing the results from dummy wooden tractors with a set of allegedly "active" metal tractors, and published his findings in a book On the Imagination as a Cause & as a Cure of Disorders of the Body.

The wooden pointers were just as useful as the expensive metal ones, showing "to a degree which has never been suspected, what powerful influence upon diseases is produced by mere imagination". While the word placebo had been used since 1772, this was the first real demonstration of the placebo effect.

Haygarth recognised this is the reason why famous doctors are often more successful than unknowns. He even went on to suggest that much medicine of the day relied on the placebo effect.

== Death ==
Haygarth died at Lambridge House near Bath on 10 June 1827, and was buried at Swainswick church in Somerset. A ward at the Chester Infirmary was named after him and a Haygarth medal was established for the best nurse in the hospital.

== See also ==
- Royal Commission on Animal Magnetism
