= Robert Skene (cricketer) =

English cricketer and soldier

Personal information
- Full name: Robert Worboys Skene
- Born: 20 May 1908; Sutton, Surrey, England
- Died: 15 April 1988 (aged 79); Blickling, Norfolk, England
- Batting: Left-handed
- Bowling: Slow left-arm orthodox

Domestic team information
- Years: Team
- 1928–1930: Oxford University

Career statistics
Competition	First-class
Matches	21
Runs scored	644
Batting average	25.76
100s/50s	1/2
Top score	105
Balls bowled	2,628
Wickets	26
Bowling average	47.30
5 wickets in innings	–
10 wickets in match	–
Best bowling	3/53
Catches/stumpings	14/–
- Source: Cricinfo, 14 April 2020

Robert Worboys Skene (20 May 1908 – 15 April 1988) was an English first-class cricketer.

Skene was born at Sutton in May 1908. He was educated at Sedbergh School, where he was a high successful schoolboy cricketer who took 155 wickets in his four years playing against other northern schools. From Sedbergh, he went up to New College, Oxford. While studying at Oxford, he played first-class cricket for Oxford University, making his debut against Kent at Oxford in 1928. He was a regular fixture in the Oxford side in 1928 and 1929, with twenty appearances. Toward the end of the 1929 season, Skene pulled out of the Oxford side to play Cambridge at Lord's, and in 1930 he was allowed just the one opportunity to re-establish himself against Kent. As a schoolboy cricketer, his bowling was his strongest suit, however during his time at Oxford his batting abilities developed. He scored 644 in his 21 first-class matches, at an average of 25.76 and a high score of 105. This score, which was his only first-class century, came against Surrey at The Oval in his freshman year of 1928. With his slow left-arm orthodox bowling, he took 26 wickets at a bowling average of 47.30 and best figures of 3 for 53.

Skene was later commissioned as a second lieutenant in the Royal Artillery during the Second World War. He died in April 1988 at Blickling, Norfolk.
