= Michael Sachs (judge) =

First solicitor to be appointed as a High Court judge

Sir Michael Alexander Geddes Sachs (8 April 1932 – 25 September 2003) was a British jurist who was the first solicitor to be appointed as a High Court judge.

== Early life ==
Sachs was born in Glasgow, the son of a GP Joseph Sachs and his wife, Ruby Mary Ross, a nurse. He was raised in Penrith and educated at Appleby Grammar School and Sedbergh School. He read law at Manchester University and took his articles at Slater, Heelis & Co in Manchester.

== Career ==
After qualifying as a solicitor, and then undertaking National Service, he returned to Slater Heelis in 1959 to work on crime, family, personal injury and common law matters. He became a partner at Slater Heelis in 1962. He acted for defendants charged with offences relating to IRA bombings in the 1970s. He was president of Manchester Law Society in 1978-9, a member of the Law Society Council from 1979 to 1984, and chairman of the Law Society's standing committee on criminal law from 1982 to 1984.

His judicial career began in 1977, when was appointed as a deputy circuit judge. He became a recorder on 9 July 1980. He left his firm and retired from private practice in 1984, on being appointed a full circuit judge. He worked for 18 months in Liverpool and then in Manchester, mostly on criminal work.

After a rally in 1989, at which Dr Kalim Siddiqui, director of the Muslim Institute in London, suggested that there should be a vote on whether Salman Rushdie should die for his blasphemous novel The Satanic Verses, Sachs ordered the BBC to give their film of the rally to the police.

In 1989 and 1990, he presided at the 16-week trial of Kevin Taylor and three other men on charges of conspiracy to defraud. After Sachs ruled that some of the prosecution's evidence was inadmissible, the trial ended with the prosecution offering no further evidence, and Taylor was acquitted. Taylor later claimed he had been targeted for malicious prosecution, as a way to smear his friend, the former Deputy Chief Constable of Greater Manchester John Stalker, who had been conducting an inquiry into the Royal Ulster Constabulary "shoot to kill" policy.

=== High Court career ===
He was appointed a High Court judge on 21 June 1993, and assigned to the Queen's Bench Division, receiving the customary knighthood on 27 October 1993. He also became an honorary bencher at the Middle Temple and an honorary member of the Law Society that year, and received an honorary doctorate of law from Manchester University in 1994. He also occasionally sat as a member of the Court of Appeal.

In June 1993, he presided at the five-month trial of 11 men for their parts in the 1990 Strangeways Prison riot, sentencing them to a total of 88 years in prison. He presided at the trial of a garage owner from Stockport in 1994, sentencing him to life imprisonment for murdering two MoT inspectors. He sent a farmer from Totnes to prison for three months in December 1995 for contempt of court, after the farmer had concealed his illegally built house by removing one floor and then covered it over with earth and grass, rather than complying with a court order to demolish it.

In 1997, after the trial of a former psychiatric nurse for the manslaughter of her handicapped 14-year-old daughter, he passed an 18-month suspended sentence and supervision order.

== Private life ==
He married Patricia Conroy in 1957. He converted to Roman Catholicism in 1980. He was survived by his wife and their two sons and two daughters.One of which is actor Hugh Sachs.
