= James Bland (priest) =

English-born Anglican priest in Ireland (died 1728)

James Bland (c. 1666 – March 1728) was an English Anglican priest in Ireland.

Bland was educated at Sedbergh School and St John's College, Cambridge.

He moved to Ireland in 1692 as chaplain to Henry Sydney, 1st Earl of Romney, the newly appointed Lord Lieutenant of Ireland. Bland became Archdeacon of Limerick on 1 June 1693, resigned in 1705, and became Archdeacon of Aghadoe on 12 July that year. He became Treasurer of Ardfert in 1711 and Dean of Ardfert in 1728.

He was married to Lucy Brewster, the eldest daughter of Sir Francis Brewster, Alderman of Dublin; and died as Vicar of Killarney in March 1728.
