= Henry Bracken =

Henry Bracken, M.D. (1697–1764), was a writer on farriery.

Bracken was the son of Henry Bracken of Lancaster, and was baptised there 31 October 1697.

His early education was gained at Lancaster under Mr. Bordley and the Rev. Thomas Holmes, and he was afterwards apprenticed to Dr. Thomas Worthington, a physician in extensive practice at Wigan. At the expiration of his apprenticeship, about 1717, he went to London, and passed a few months as a pupil at St Thomas' Hospital. Thence he went over to Paris to attend the Hôtel-Dieu, and subsequently to Leyden, where he studied under Herman Boerhaave, and took his degree of M.D., but his name is omitted from the Album Studiosorum Academiæ Lugd. Bat., printed in 1875.

On his return to London he attended the practice of Drs. Wadsworth and Plumtree, and soon began to practise on his own account at Lancaster, and before long became widely known as a surgeon and author.

About 1746 he was charged with abetting the Jacobite rebels and thrown into prison, but was discharged without trial, there appearing to have been no ground for his arrest; indeed, he had previously rendered a service to the king by intercepting a messenger to the rebels, and sending the letters to the general of the king's forces, and for this act he had been obliged to keep out of the way of the Pretender's followers.

He received much honour in his native town, and was twice elected mayor — in 1747-48 and 1757-58. In his method of practice as a medical man he was remarkably simple, discarding many of the usual nostrums. In private life he was liberal, generous, charitable, and popular; but his love of horse-racing, of conviviality, and of smuggling, which he called gambling with the king, prevented him from reaping or retaining the full fruits of his success.

== Publications ==
He published several books on horses, written in a rough, unpolished style, but abounding in such sterling sense as to cause him to be placed by John Lawrence at the head of all veterinary writers, ancient or modern. Their dates and titles are as follows:

- in 1735, an edition of Captain William Burdon's Gentleman's Pocket Farrier, with notes
- in 1738, Farriery Improved, or a Compleat Treatise upon the Art of Farriery, 2 vols., which went through ten or more editions
- in 1742, The Traveller's Pocket Farrier
- in 1751, A Treatise on the True Seat of Glanders in Horses, together with the Method of Cure, from the French of De la Fosse.
- The Midwife's Companion, 1737, which he dedicated to Boerhaave (it was issued with a fresh title-page in 1751)
- Lithiasis Anglicana; or, a Philosophical Enquiry into the Nature and Origin of the Stone and Gravel in Human Bodies, 1739
- a translation from the French of Maitre-Jan on the eye
- some papers on smallpox, &c.

On the establishment of the London Medical Society, Dr. Fothergill wrote to request the literary assistance of Bracken, 'for whose abilities', he observed, 'I have long had a great esteem, and who has laboured more successfully for the improvement of medicine than most of his contemporaries',

Bracken died at Lancaster, 13 November 1764.
