= Nicola Bozzo =

Italian rugby union player

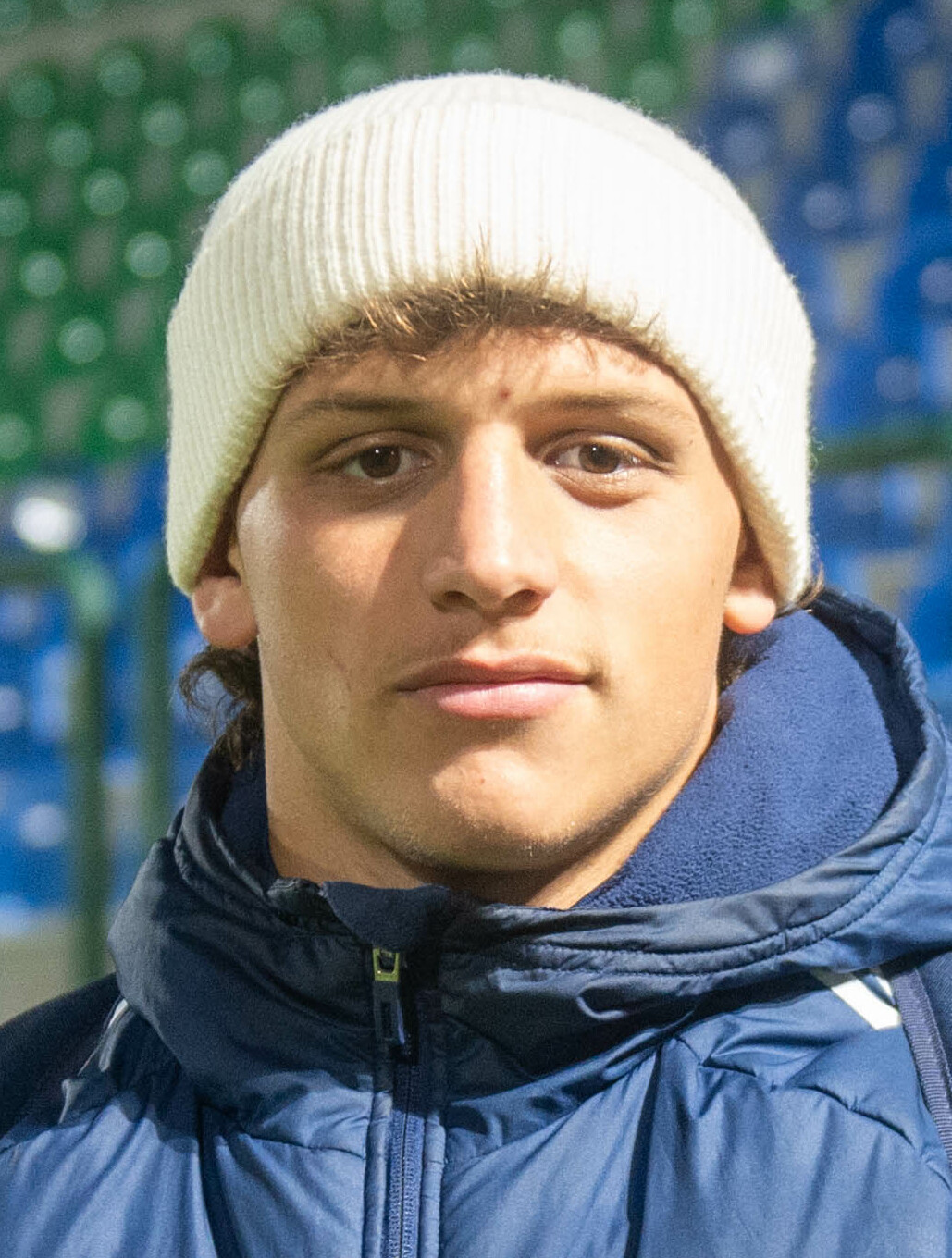
- Born: 1 August 2004 (age 22) Genova, Italy
- Height: 1.77 m (5 ft 9 1/2 in)
- Weight: 94 kg (14.8 st; 207 lb)

Rugby union career
- Position: Centre
Youth career
- -: Pro Recco Rugby
- –: Verona Rugby
- –: Sedbergh School
- 2022–2024: USA Perpignan
Senior career
| Years | Team | Apps | (Points) |
| 2023– | USA Perpignan | 1 | (0) |
International career
| Years | Team | Apps | (Points) |
| 2023− | Italy U20 | 9 | (0) |
- Correct as of 29 Dec 2023

Nicola Bozzo (born 1 August 2004) is an Italian rugby union player, who plays for USA Perpignan in Top 14.

== Club career ==
Signed in Summer 2022 for Espoirs team, he made his debut for Perpignan in Round 2 of the 2023–24 EPCR Challenge Cup against Benetton.

== International career ==
In 2023 and 2024, Bozzo was named in Italy U20s squad for annual Six Nations Under 20s Championship.
