= George Edwards Peacock =

Australian artist (1806–1890)

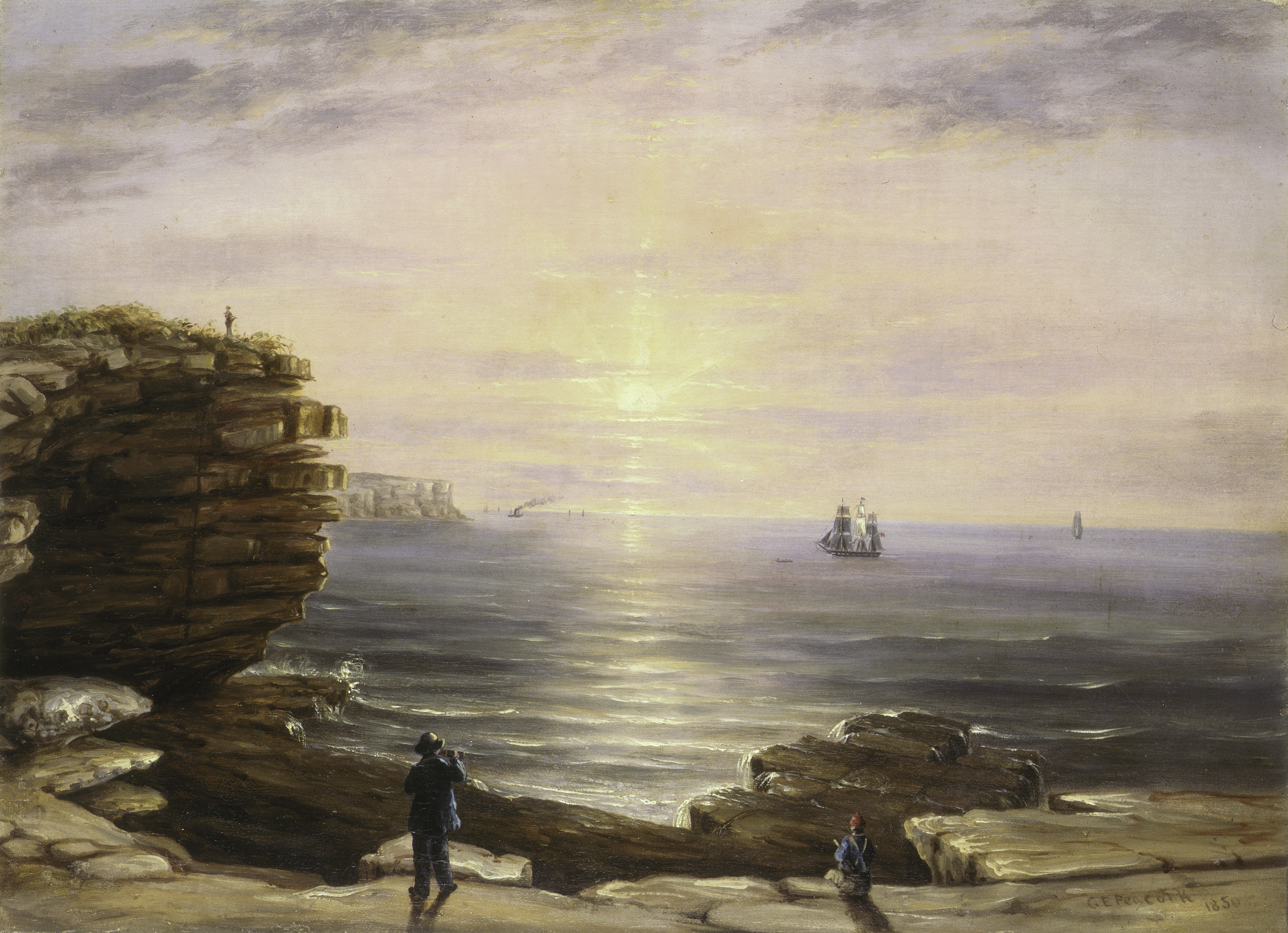
- Morning at the Heads Port Jackson, 1850, G. E. Peacock
- Born: George Edwards Peacock; 4 September 1806; Sedbergh, Yorkshire England
- Died: 1890
- Known for: Painting, Meteorology, Law
- Movement: Landscape painting

George Edwards Peacock was an Australian colonial artist. He was born in England and transported to Australia for forgery in 1837. While working as a meteorologist at South Head, Sydney, he started exhibiting paintings. The surviving landscape paintings are now considered as early documents of colonial Sydney.

== Early life ==
George Edwards Peacock was born in Sedbergh, Yorkshire on 4 September 1806 and educated at Sedbergh School. He was the younger son of the vicar of Sedbergh, Rev. Daniel Mitford Peacock, and Catherine, nee Edwards; both sons were given her maiden name. Peacock was admitted as a solicitor in February 1830 and although he ran his own practice it did not fare well. In 1836 he forged a power of attorney for transfer of stock valued at £7,814, the property of his brother, Rev. Edwards George Peacock. After appearing in court for the forgery he was sentenced to death at London's Old Bailey but the sentence was commuted to transportation for life. Before being sent to Australia Peacock spent time on board the hulk Justisa, moored in the Thames.

Peacock eventually reached Sydney aboard the Prince George on 8 May 1837. As a 'special’ or educated prisoner, he was sent to Port Macquarie where he acted as clerk to the prison barracks. There is no evidence that he painted at this time and three months after his arrival, Peacock’s wife and son joined him at Port Macquarie. By 1839, however, his family was living in Sydney and Peacock was requesting a transfer there. By 1840 he was back in Sydney training at Paramatta Observatory with the government astronomer, James Dunlop and he was afterwards employed as a meteorologist at the South Head Weather Station. While Peacock's work was dismissed as 'unworthy of confidence' by the Colonial Astronomer, Rev. William Scott, Peacock's reports remain the only daily account of Sydney's weather between 1840 and 1856. After his marriage break-up, he moved into a nearby cottage and the views from the road to Sydney became the subject of many of his paintings. On 27 November 1847, it was announced in the Sydney Chronicle that the governor had granted a conditional pardon to George Peacock which enabled him to proceed to all parts of the world except England.

Peacock appears to have been most active as a painter between 1845 and 1852 and in 1847 he exhibited with the Society for the Promotion of the Fine Arts in Australia. On 22 June 1850 Bell's Life reported on an exhibition of local works at Kern and Mader's of George Street where they were highly complimentary of a copy of an oil picture by Mr. Peacock of South Head. They also listed 'Richmond Road' and 'Buttermero Lake' as landscapes by Peacock. In March 1851 the dealer J.T. Grocott had five of Peacock's oil views of Port Jackson on display at his gallery, together with lithographs after Peacock's painting, Citizens' Mayor's Picnic.

After the closure of the meteorological station in South Head little is known about Peacock's movements. In an article in the Sydney Morning Herald from 1857, P. G. K. says that Peacock had 'bolted from the colony' suggesting this may be the reason no later works have come to light.

== Works ==
- Sydney from Woolloomooloo, 1849, G.E. Peacock, State Library of New South Wales ML 72
- View of Lyons' Terrace Hyde Park Sydney N.S.W., 1849, G.E. Peacock, State Library of New South Wales DG 218
- Port Jackson NSW distant view from above Double Bay - on the South Head Road, 1847, G. E. Peacock, State Library of New South Wales ML 237
- View from Glenrock looking towards Double Bay in Port Jackson, NSW, 1846, G. E. Peacock, State Library of New South Wales ML 493
- Parsley Bay, ca. 1845, G. E. Peacock, State Library of New South Wales DG 34
- View from Craigend looking over Government House and Domain, 1845, G. E. Peacock, State Library of New South Wales DL 14
- Sydney from the North Shore, 1845, G. E. Peacock, State Library of New South Wales DG 313
- No.4 Government House and Fort Macquarie Sydney N.S.W. from the Botanical Gardens, 1846, G. E. Peacock, State Library of New South Wales DG 336
- View of the town of Parramatta from May's Hill, ca. 1840, attributed to G. E. Peacock, State Library of New South Wales ML 1226
- No. 6 Port Jackson N.S.W. Woolloomooloo Lady Darling's and Point Piper Points in perspective from the Domain, 1846, G. E. Peacock, State Library of New South Wales DG 337
- Supreme Court House, Sydney N.S.W., 1845, G. E. Peacock, State Library of New South Wales ML 659
- Government House, ca. 1850, G. E. Peacock, State Library of New South Wales DG 206
- View of Woolloomooloo from the South Head Road, 1844, G. E. Peacock, State Library of New South Wales DG 376
