= Grazia Bozzo =

Italian gymnast

Personal information
- Nationality: Italian
- Born: 23 January 1936 (age 89); Sestri Ponente, Italy

Sport
- Sport: Gymnastics

Grazia Bozzo (born 23 January 1936) is an Italian gymnast. She competed in seven events at the 1952 Summer Olympics.
