= Jim Muir =

British journalist (born 1948)

- Born: 3 June 1948 (age 77); Farnborough, Hampshire, England
- Occupation: Journalist
- Notable credit: BBC News

Jim Muir (born 3 June 1948) is a British journalist, currently serving as a Middle East correspondent for BBC News, based in Beirut, Lebanon.

== Education ==
Muir is of Scottish heritage, but was born in Farnborough, Hampshire, in England in 1948, and was educated at Sedbergh School in Sedbergh, then in the West Riding of Yorkshire, before going on to study Oriental Studies (Arabic) at Sidney Sussex College, Cambridge, where he graduated with a first class honours degree in 1969.

== Career ==
Muir worked at Frank Cass & Co, a specialist international politics academic publishing company, in London between 1970 and 1974. He drove to Beirut after Christmas 1974, assuming Lebanon to be a safe haven in the turbulent Arab world. However, not long after arriving, a devastating 15-year civil war broke out. Muir was the Beirut correspondent for the Inter Press Service between 1975 and 1978, and then became a freelance correspondent for the BBC, The Sunday Times, The Daily Telegraph, The Christian Science Monitor and National Public Radio, among others. In 1980, he had to relocate to Cyprus and make periodic visits to Lebanon after being put on a Syrian hitlist. He is thought to be "the only western correspondent to cover the [civil war] from start to finish".

Muir said of Lebanon: "They used to say Lebanon was the country where you could ski in the morning and swim in the afternoon, but after one particular trip to the South, I remember thinking it should be billed as the country where you could get shot at by the Israelis in the morning, shelled by right-wing Christians at lunchtime, and kidnapped by Islamic fanatics in the afternoon." Muir was the Lebanon correspondent for Middle East International.

As Lebanon's civil war died down, the Gulf War started. Muir monitoring Baghdad radio and provided news on the scene. Once Desert Storm had driven the Iraqis out of Kuwait, he went to northern Iraq to join the Kurds as they rose up against Saddam Hussein. Muir spent time embedded with the Kurdish Pesh Merga army as they defended themselves against the Iraqi central government. At this time, Muir had little contact with the outside world: "I had to shout my despatches down a tenuous walkie-talkie link to offices in Damascus which recorded them and passed them on to London. If they got through, the quality was so bad that they had to be voiced-over as though in a foreign language."

Muir continued to cover Lebanon and the wider Middle East, as well as Afghanistan and Bosnia between 1993 and 1994. Muir became a Middle East correspondent for BBC News based in Cairo, Egypt, between 1995 and 1999, in Tehran, Iran, between 1999 and 2004, and he returned to Beirut in 2004. He has been a lead reporter on various stories, including the election of Mohammad Khatami as President of Iran, the Algerian Civil War, and most recently, the 2014 Northern Iraq offensive. In 2010, Muir received the MBI Lifetime Achievement Award at the International Media Awards.
