= Thomas Wilson (schoolmaster) =

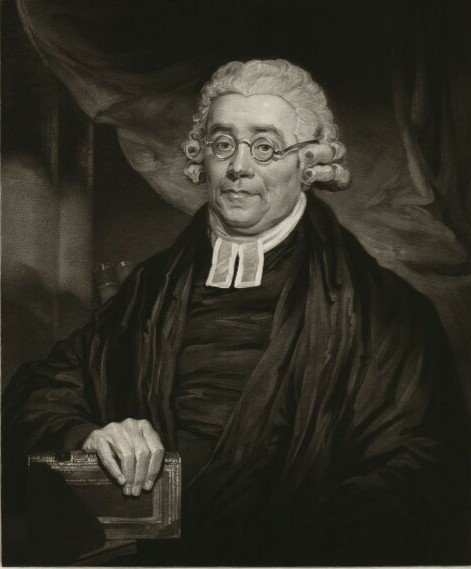
Thomas Wilson (1747–1813)

Thomas Wilson (1747–1813) was an English cleric, known as master of Clitheroe grammar school.

== Life ==
The son of William and Isabella Wilson, he was born at Priest Hutton, in the parish of Warton, near Lancaster, on 3 Dec. 1747, and educated at Archbishop Hutton's Grammar School, in Warton, and Sedbergh Grammar School. At Sedbergh he was an assistant under Dr. Wynne Bateman from 1768 to 1771.

Wilson was ordained deacon at Westminster on 13 January 1771, and priest at Chester on 2 August 1772. In the following June he was licensed as headmaster of Slaidburn grammar school, and in June 1775 became master of Clitheroe grammar school, Lancashire, and incumbent of the parochial chapel of the town.

In 1779 Wilson entered Trinity College, Cambridge, and he took the degree of B.D. there in 1795, as a ten-year man under an Elizabethan statute. In 1807 he was appointed rector of Claughton, near Lancaster. The living was provided by Thomas Fenwick of Borough Hall, Westmorland, a former pupil.

Towards the end of the eighteenth century Wilson became friends with Thomas Dunham Whitaker, and joined his literary club. He was a successful schoolmaster, a versifier, and a social favourite, wit and raconteur, fond of punning.

Wilson died on 3 March 1813, and was buried in the chancel of Bolton-by-Bowland church, where a tablet was erected with a Latin inscription by Whitaker. It copied from a monument put up by Wilson's pupils in Clitheroe church.

== Works ==
Wilson published in 1782 an Archæological Dictionary, or Classical Antiquities of Jews, Greeks, and Romans. It was dedicated to Samuel Johnson. Two of his assize sermons (1789 and 1804) were printed. His Lancashire Bouquet and other occasional verses were circulated in manuscript. They were collected and printed in 1857, along with his correspondence, by Francis Robert Raines for the Chetham Society.

== Family ==
Wilson married, on 29 April 1775, Susannah Tetlow of Skirden, widow of Henry Nowell, rector of Bolton-by-Bowland. She was 44, and he 28.
