= Gadfly =

Gadfly most commonly refers to:

- Horse fly or botfly
- Gadfly (philosophy and social science), a person who upsets the status quo

Gadfly may also refer to:

== Entertainment ==
- The Gadfly, an 1897 novel by Ethel Lilian Voynich
  - The Gadfly (play), an 1898 play by George Bernard Shaw
  - The Gadfly (1928 film), a Soviet film by Kote Marjanishvili
  - The Gadfly (1955 film), a Soviet film by Aleksandr Fajntsimmer
    - The Gadfly Suite, a musical suite by Dmitri Shostakovich for the 1955 film
  - The Gadfly (1980 film), a Soviet film by Nikolai Mashchenko
  - The Gadfly (opera), a 1958 Russian opera by Antonio Spadavecchia
- Gadfly Online, an online and print magazine
- The Gadfly (Adelaide), a 1906–1909 Australian literary magazine produced by C. J. Dennis
- The Gadfly (album), a 2003 album by LPG
- The Gadfly, a fictional play in the novels of Geoffrey Trease, see The Hills of Varna

== Other uses ==
- Gadfly (database), a relational database management system
- Gadfly (mythology), the insect sent by Hera to torment Io in Greek mythology
- Gadfly, the NATO reporting name for a Russian 9K37 Buk surface-to-air missile system
- Education Gadfly, the weekly e-bulletin of the Thomas B. Fordham Institute
- Autism's Gadfly, a blog maintained by Jonathan Mitchell (writer)

== See also ==
- HMS Gadfly, a list of ships of the Royal Navy
