= Ovod =

Ovod (Russian: Овод) is a Russian word meaning Gadfly. It may refer to several films based on Ethel Lilian Voynich's 1897 novel The Gadfly:

- Krazana, 1928 Georgian SSR (USSR) film "Ovod"
- Ovod (1928 film)
- Ovod (1955 film)
- Ovod (1980 film)
- Ovod (opera)
- Ovod (suite)
- Ovod corvette
- Ovod (plane)
