= Gemma Khalid =

Russian singer

Gemma Khalid (alternately Jamuna or Jemma Halid) is a Russian singer active since the 1990s.

Gemma was born in Moscow. Her mother is Russian, her father is Yusuf Khalid, is of Amazigh origin from Morocco. The parents named the girl Gemma, after the heroine of the famous novel The Gadfly by E. L. Voynich.

Gemma graduated from music school with a degree in piano. Since 1987, for 3 years, she studied at the Gnessin State Musical College in vocal class.

According to Edita Piekha, "Having an original voice, she does not imitate anyone, she is very original, emotional. You can feel a person and an actress in her".

== Discography ==
- 1989 Gemma Halid (Polish Nagrania)
- 1996 Underground Passage
- 1998 Oh, This Girl
- 2000 Goodbye, Taganka (re-release of the disc "Underground Passage")
- 2005 Russian Kiss
- 2009 The Girl from Nagasaki
