= 2032 (disambiguation) =

2032 will be a leap year starting on Thursday of the Gregorian calendar. It may also refer to:

- 2032 (number)
- 2032 (album), an album by Gong
- 2032 Ethel, an asteroid
- CR-2032, a button cell battery
