= Spadavecchia =

Spadavecchia is an Italian surname. Notable people with the surname include:

- Antonio Spadavecchia (1907–1988), Russian classical composer
- John Spadavecchia, American poker player
- Vitangelo Spadavecchia (born 1982), Italian footballer
