= Social thriller =

Genre combining thriller fiction with social commentary

A social thriller is a film genre using elements of suspense to augment instances of oppression in society. The genre gained attention by audiences and critics around the late 2010s with the releases of Jordan Peele's Get Out and Us, each film highlighting occurrences of racial alienation (the former which veil a plot to abduct young African-Americans). Before Peele, other film actors, directors, writers, and critics had used the term to describe an emerging genre of cinema with examples from all over the globe.

Many social thrillers focus on issues of race, class, gender, sexuality, or nationhood, often within the format of genre films more broadly categorized as a black comedy, film noir, psychological drama, and horror cinema, among others.

== Early usage ==
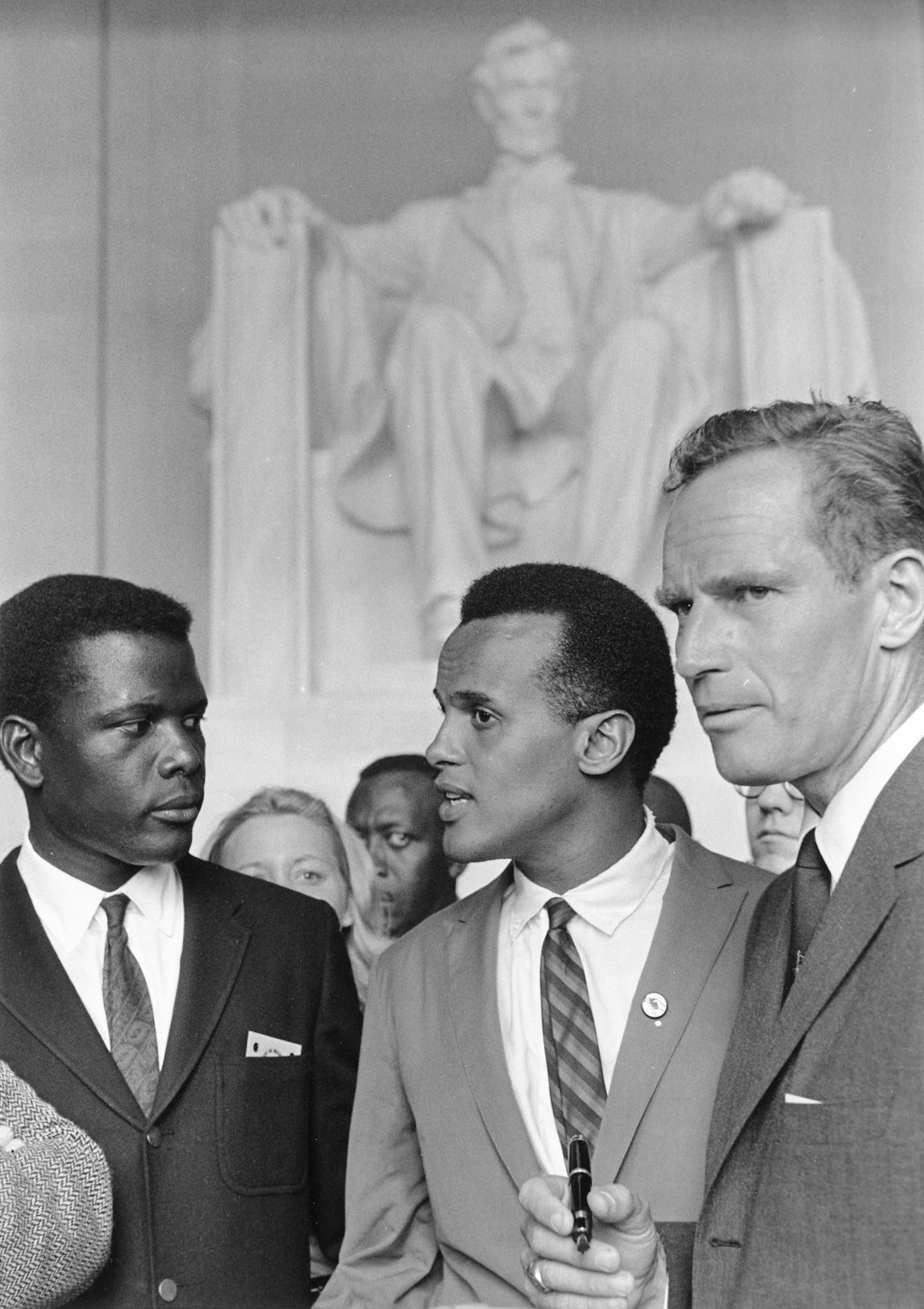
Social thriller actor Sidney Poitier (left) at the 1963 March on Washington, alongside Harry Belafonte and Charlton Heston

"Social thriller" first appeared in film criticism to denote films using elements of suspense to heighten dramatic tension caused by social inequity. Often appearing in quotes, the term was being used as early as the 1970s to retrospectively describe political neo-noir cinema. An early example comes from cinema writer Georges Sadoul's characterization of El Wahsh ("The Monster"), an Egyptian crime film entered into the 1954 Cannes Film Festival. Sadoul sums up the film as "a social thriller based on an authentic police case about police pursuit of a drug-addicted gangster." Sadoul goes on to describe the film's documentary style and backdrop of life in the Egyptian countryside. Other early uses of the term can be found in descriptions of French New Wave films, such as The Nada Gang, Claude Chabrol's 1974 film inspired by the May 1968 events in France. In their book, French Culture Since 1945, Malcolm and Martin Cook wrote that "Chabrol's career has been almost exclusively devoted to what might be called the 'social thriller'" and go on to define the genre as, "films using a suspense format often akin to that of Hitchcock to comment on the deviousness and duplicity of French society."

Many other film critics bandied about the term in their reviews prior to the 2010s but seldom in a way that gave the social thriller its own status as a codified genre in cinema. Prior to 2017, most writers used the term only once, usually in a single review, and to characterize an individual film. In his biography on William Wyler, Axel Madsen calls the 1937 Humphrey Bogart picture Dead End a social thriller. TLA Video reviewer David Bleiler described the 1950 Sidney Poitier film No Way Out as "an exceptionally made, tense drama which succeeds both as medical soap opera and social thriller." Douglas Brode called Spencer Tracy "the alienated anti-hero of the social thriller" for his 1955 performance in Bad Day at Black Rock. Another Poitier film, 1967's In the Heat of the Night, got tagged as social thriller by Leonard Maltin, and was also cited as such on the floor of the U.S. House of Representatives. Both Tracy and Poitier also appeared in 1967's Guess Who's Coming to Dinner, a film that would later be identified as a key "non-thriller" example of the social thriller genre.

For films produced outside the U.S., more than one reviewer has named the 1961 British film Victim as a social thriller. As the first English language film on record to use the word "homosexual" in its dialogue, Victim raised controversy in the United Kingdom for its critique of Britain's anti-gay laws that would remain in place until the passing of Sexual Offences Act 1967 decriminalized homosexuality for men in England and Wales. Ismal Xavier called the 1962 Brazilian political train robbery film O Assalto ao Trem Pagador ("Assault on the Payroll Train") a social thriller. Taiwanese director Bai Jingrui's 1982 film Offend the Law of God has been called "an exploitation social thriller" and the 1996 Spanish film Taxi, about the rise of the racist right wing, has also been given the label.

In his Historical Dictionary of Russian and Soviet Cinema, author Peter Rollberg goes a bit further than the one-mention references of his peers. In describing the work of Russo-Belarusian director Aleksandr Faintsimmer, Rollberg writes, "Fainsimmer devoted himself to the traditionally underrepresented genre of the social thriller with blockbusters such as No Right to Fail (1974) and The Cafeteria on Piatnikskaia Street (1978)." Rollberg also names Leonid Filatov's 1982 film The Rooks and Vadim Derbenev's 1985 hit The Snake Catcher as landmarks of the genre in the Soviet Union.

== 21st century western cinema ==
At the onset of the 2000s, critics and scholars continued to label a number of contemporary films as social thrillers. The authors of Sociology: An Introductory Textbook and Reader wrote of the 2002 British film Dirty Pretty Things as being "not a documentary but a social thriller which blends aspects of the global urban legends about child kidnapping for organs and prostitutes drugging unsuspecting barflies who wake up in a hotel bathtub minus a kidney." The New Yorker echoed this sentiment, saying, "Dirty Pretty Things is not a violent thriller. It might be called a social thriller—a creepy, tightly knit suspense film that, on the fly, reveals more about the lives of immigrants in London than the most scrupulously earnest documentary." Other films labeled as social thrillers from the first decade-and-a-half of the new millennium include 2005's British production of The Constant Gardener and the 2008 Italian film As God Commands, both based on the best-selling novels of the same names. The Wall Street Journal called 2010's The Social Network "Part morality play, part social thriller", the 2012 Canadian child abduction film The Tall Man got called a social thriller for its DVD release, and the French film festival hit Corporate was called a social thriller in 2016, several months in advance of its 2017 release.

== Modern Indian cinema ==
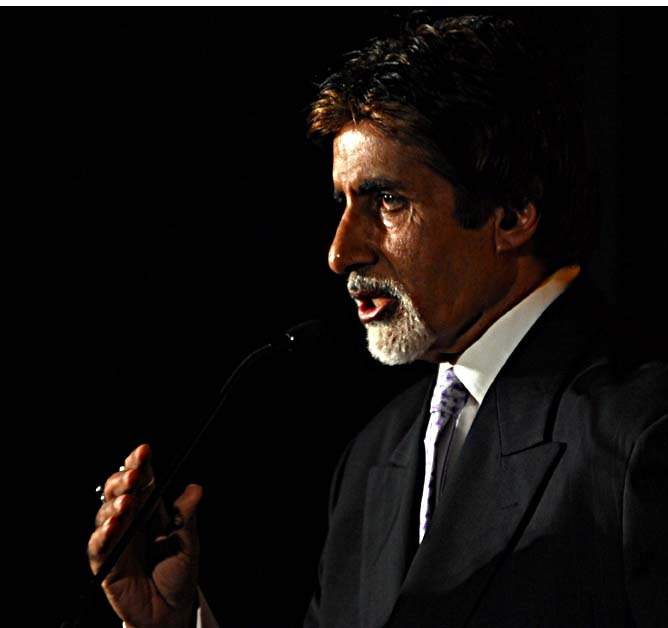
Bollywood star Amitabh Bachchan speaking in April 2006

Like the West, Indian cinema has a longstanding tradition of identifying some movies as "social films" or "social problem films", genres that emerged when talking pictures first came to India in the 1930s. The rise of "social thriller" as a genre garnered familiarity in India, as it did in the U.S., in its association with a major box office hit. 2016's Pink, a courtroom drama that deals with rape, was India's highest-grossing film ever to be released. Pink starred longtime Bollywood icon Amitabh Bachchan, who named the film a social thriller. Bachchan said of Pink that, "the context and the premise of the film shall always be of prime interest," but that "much is not spelt out because of the nature of the story and, of course, the nature of its genre—a social thriller!"

Before Pink the term social thriller was applied occasionally by Bollywood's directors and marketers and then repeated by the press to describe selected movies, such as 2014's film Fugly starring olympic boxing medalist Vijender Singh. Prior to Fugly's release, the press were unfamiliar with the genre, and in a film preview the India Times said that it was "the movie that's been billed as a 'social thriller' (whatever that is)." After Fugly, other social thriller tags followed suit, such as 2014's Bhopal: A Prayer for Rain about the Union Carbide Disaster, and 2016's Laal Rang about the organized crime trafficking in human blood.

South Indian film columnists may have been using the term prior to their North Indian counterparts. G. Dhananjayan called the 2009 Tamil language film Achchamundu! Achchamundu! ("There is fear! There is fear!") a social thriller, citing it as "one of the rare mainstream Tamil films with the subject on pedophiles." Tamil director Bramma G. called his 2014 debut film, Kutram Kaditha, a social thriller. The same year Jean Marcose called his Malayalam film Angels a social thriller. Film Beat's Akhila Menon used the term to describe both Puthiya Niyamam and Evidam Swargamanu in 2015. Other Tamil social thrillers include 2016's Kabali, and Aagam, of which director Vijay Anand Sriram claimed, "has a message but it will not be preachy. It's a social thriller with commercial elements in it".

Post-Pink social thrillers in Indian cinema have included Adanga Maru, Jhalki...Ek Aur Bachpan, Mulq, Pinu, Parari, Blue Whale, and Marainthirunthu, all released in 2018.

== Get Out and after ==
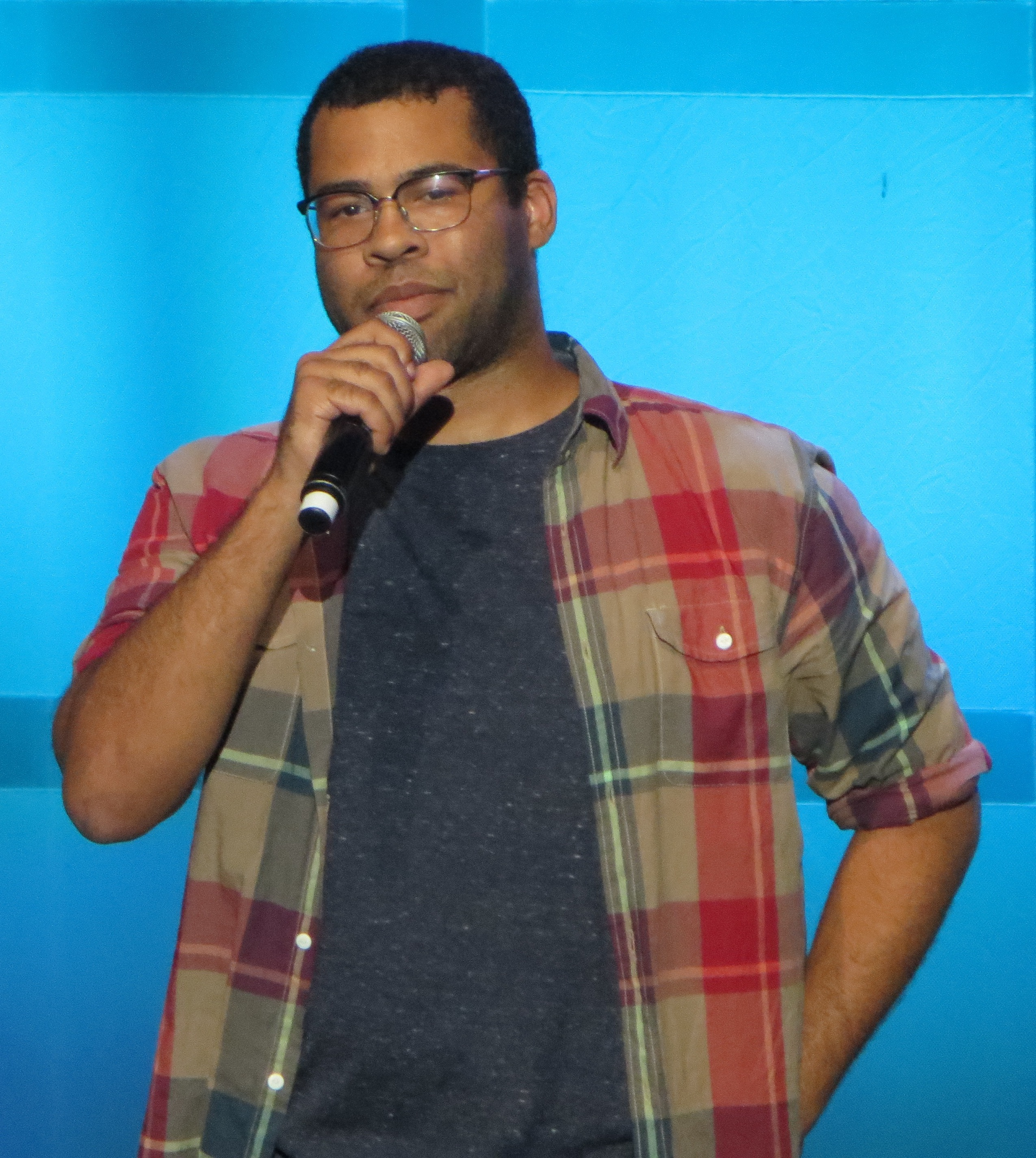
Director and comedian Jordan Peele performing in 2012

Broadly categorized as a horror film, director Jordan Peele stated that his directorial debut, Get Out, was part of a lineage of social thrillers, meaning that whatever scary things manifest onscreen, society is actually the true evil. In a February 2017 interview, Peele told the Chicago Tribune, "I define 'social thriller' as thriller/horror movies where the ultimate villain is society." In March he told the New York Times that social thrillers "all deal with this human monster, this societal monster. And the villain is us." He later told New York Magazine, "I was trying to figure out what genre this movie was, and horror didn't quite do it. Psychological thriller didn't do it, and so I thought, Social thriller. The bad guy is society—these things that are innate in all of us, and provide good things, but ultimately prove that humans are always going to be barbaric, to an extent. I think I coined the term social thriller, but I definitely didn't invent it."

To coincide with the release of Get Out, Peele curated a film series for the Brooklyn Academy of Music (BAM) called The Art of the Social Thriller. The series featured classic horror films like Rosemary's Baby, Night of the Living Dead, The Shining, The Silence of the Lambs, Candyman, The People Under the Stairs, and the first film of Wes Craven's Scream series. Peele also included films outside of the horror genre, such as psychological thrillers Funny Games and Misery, Hitchcock's mystery thriller Rear Window, and comedy-thriller The 'Burbs. The sneak preview of Get Out was preceded by the 1967 comedy-drama Guess Who's Coming to Dinner, the first Hollywood film to address interracial marriage and a big influence on the premise for Peele's own film. When asked about its inclusion in the series, Peele told the Village Voice, "It's not an actual thriller, it's just a great exploration of the social phenomenon of how we deal with race, putting it in a package that everyone can understand. Anybody can relate to the fear of meeting your potential in-laws for the first time... At a certain point with Get Out, I realized that I was making a sort of thriller take on Guess Who's Coming to Dinner."

After Get Out's success, Peele announced that he had plans to make four more social thrillers in the next decade. In an interview with Business Insider he said, "The best and scariest monsters in the world are human beings and what we are capable of especially when we get together. I've been working on these premises about these different social demons, these innately human monsters that are woven into the fabric of how we think and how we interact, and each one of my movies is going to be about a different one of these social demons." By the time Peel's second film, Us, was under production, it had veered away from its original inceptions as a "social" thriller and fell more squarely into the horror genre. Whereas Peele's treatment of Get Out's black protagonist and white antagonists made it a film about race, he strove to make Us not be about race. "It's important to me that we can tell black stories without it being about race," Peele told Rolling Stone in early 2019. "I realized I had never seen a horror movie of this kind, where there's an African-American family at the center that just is. After you get over the initial realization that you're watching a black family in a horror film, you're just watching a movie. You're just watching people. I feel like it proves a very valid and different point than Get Out, which is, not everything is about race. Get Out proved the point that everything is about race. I've proved both points!"

By mid-2017 the press had started touting upcoming films as belonging to the genre, including international Cannes Film Festival favorites like Colombia's Matar a Jesús, France's L'Atelier; Brazil's Rifle, and the remake of Argentina's La Patota. Variety wrote that animated film Tales of the Hedgehog was both "a children's thriller" and "a social thriller-fable" after director Alain Gagnol described it as a "suspenseful social fable." From Hollywood, the social media scandal movie Assassination Nation, and Greg McLean and James Gunn's The Belko Experiment, were promised as social thrillers, as was Kathryn Bigelow's Detroit as part of the social thriller canon.

Musician/author Boots Riley's 2018 directorial debut Sorry to Bother You was tapped as being a social thriller by both The Guardian and Deadline, and multiple reviewers compared Riley's film to Get Out. That same year Rolling Stone posited Tyrel, a drama about one black man's weekend getaway with a bunch of drunk white men, as a social thriller. In 2019 Luce, a film about the external expectations placed on young black men in America, got the social thriller tag after its debut at the Sundance Film Festival. On the eve of the 2019 Academy Awards The A.V. Club added Cam, a psychological horror film told from the perspective of an online sex worker, to the genre's roster, saying, "One year after Get Out, another social thriller deserves Oscar love for its script. Likewise the website Insider clamored "to see Lee Chang-dong's tense social thriller Burning in this race" for Best Foreign Language Film at the 2019 Academy Awards. A 2019 Cannes Film Festival The Associated Press headline proclaimed that "South Korean director Bong Joon-ho's social thriller Parasite wins Palme d'Or" and that third-place jury prizes were also awarded to "two socially conscious thrillers: The French director Ladj Ly's feature-film debut Les Miserables and Brazilian director Kleber Mendonça Filho's Bacurau." With Get Out helping to codify the genre, critics have continued to apply the term retrospectively, with more than one review adding the 1975 science fiction thriller The Stepford Wives to the canon.

== Critique ==
Use of social thriller as a genre term has come under scrutiny since its widened use. One critique is that niche genres such as horror are re-labeled to draw a more mainstream fanbase. In a news piece about 2017's most successful horror films, journalist Haleigh Foutch wrote that "Get Out is being billed as a 'social thriller' now that the film has dominated at the box office and conjured early awards buzz." Critic Jacob Knight has also cited uses of "social thriller", "social horror" and "elevated horror" to describe Get Out and the 2018 films Hereditary and A Quiet Place, saying, "'elevated horror' (or even 'social horror', for that matter) doesn't exist. It never did, and it never will. Filmmakers have been attempting to distance themselves from the 'horror' label for decades, as it's a genre that's been ghettoized for most of its existence." In an opinion piece for SYFY Wire Emma Fraser wrote that "social thriller" refers to a specific kind of horror but that "by dressing this genre up, it actually does it a disservice." Fraser goes on to say that filmmakers like George A. Romero, David Cronenberg and John Carpenter have used the horror genre to address social issues such as racism or the AIDS epidemic, and that many horror films bear social significance without relying on the social thriller label.

== In other media ==
=== Literature ===
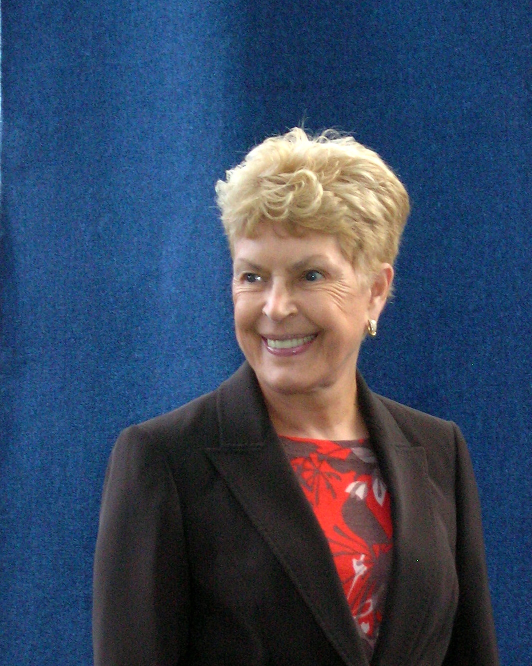
Social thriller author Ruth Rendell

Outside the medium of cinema, literary critics have used the term "social thriller" as early as the first decade of the 2000s. Writing on the psychological crime novels of Ruth Rendell in 2002, Lidia Kyzlinková at Masaryk University remarked, "Rendell may be seen as having developed a kind of social thriller, in which various representations around region, class, race, gender, or age form an important part of the plot." Three years later Kyzlinková subtitled another chapter on Rendell, "Social Thriller,Ethnicity and Englishness", in which she characterized works whose plots focus less on detectives or police as being "socio-psychological, or social thrillers."

Also writing in 2002, The New York Daily News said that Iain Pears Riverhead's book The Dream of Scipio "uses a larger-than-ever canvas to construct this genre-bending historical and social thriller." Business Wire later called Kathleen Kaufman's 2009 dystopian novel The Tree Museum "an environmental thriller that follows a world completely transformed by an enigmatic and powerful totalitarian force" in a review titled, "New Social Thriller, The Tree Museum, to Challenge the Ethics of State-Enforced Environmentalism." MacMillan Publishing described Six Suspects, Vikas Swarup's 2010 follow-up to Slumdog Millionaire as "a richly textured social thriller."

After its proliferation as a cinematic genre, the term was used to describe DC/Vertigo comic book Safe Sex.

=== Theatre and television ===
As film writers began applying the term with greater frequency after its 2017 upsurge, theatre critics followed suit. Time Out New York reviewer Adam Feldman wrote that the Broadway show Junk "melds a breadth of genres—crime story, tragedy, issue play, cautionary tale—into a fast-moving, broad-ranging social thriller." By 2018 the term had leapt to television, and was used to describe the Netflix series What/If and indian series Criminal Justice.

=== Radio and podcasting ===
In September 2018 The New York Times highlighted a number of fiction podcasts as contributions to the social thriller genre, chiefly the politically charged dystopian fantasy Adventures in New America by filmmakers Stephen Winter and Tristan Cowen. Audio fiction publisher Night Vale Presents touted the term on its own website, citing comparisons to Boots Riley's film Sorry to Bother You and the work of Jordan Peele. The Times also cited Gimlet Media's subterranean serial The Horror of Dolores Roach and Panoply Media's airline disaster whodunit Passenger List as being among the social thrillers cropping up in the new wave of serialized audio fiction.

== List of selected social thriller films ==
- Dead End (1937)
- No Way Out (1950)
- Rear Window (1954)
- Bad Day at Black Rock (1955)
- Vertigo (1958)
- Victim (1961)
- In the Heat of the Night (1967)
- Rosemary's Baby (1968)
- Night of the Living Dead (1968)
- The Nada Gang (1974)
- The Stepford Wives (1975)
- Taxi Driver (1976)
- The Cafeteria on Piatnikskaia Street (1978)
- The Shining (1980)
- The 'Burbs (1989)
- Misery (1990)
- The People Under the Stairs (1991)
- The Silence of the Lambs (1991)
- Candyman (1992)
- Scream (1996)
- Taxi (1996)
- Funny Games (1997)
- Perfect Blue (1997)
- Dirty Pretty Things (2002)
- The Constant Gardener (2005)
- Zero Dark Thirty (2012)
- It Follows (2014)
- Spotlight (2015)
- The Belko Experiment (2016)
- Detroit (2017)
- Get Out (2017)
- mother! (2017)
- BlacKkKlansman (2018)
- Sorry to Bother You (2018)
- Tyrel (2018)
- Joker (2019)
- Knives Out (2019)
- Les Miserables (2019)
- Luce (2019)
- Parasite (2019)
- Us (2019)
- Don't Worry Darling (2022)
- Nope (2022)
- No Other Choice (2025)

=== List of directors associated with social thrillers ===
- Aleksandr Faintsimmer
- Alfred Hitchcock
- Bong Joon-ho
- George A. Romero
- Jordan Peele
- Wes Craven

== See also ==
- Message film
- Postmodernist film
- Vulgar auteurism
- Social issues
- Message picture
- Extreme cinema
- New Hollywood
- Art horror
- Arthouse action film
- Neo-noir
- Satire (film and television)
- Race in horror films
- Indiewood
- Social science fiction
