= Semyon Kotko =

Opera by Sergei Prokofiev

- Opera by Sergei Prokofiev
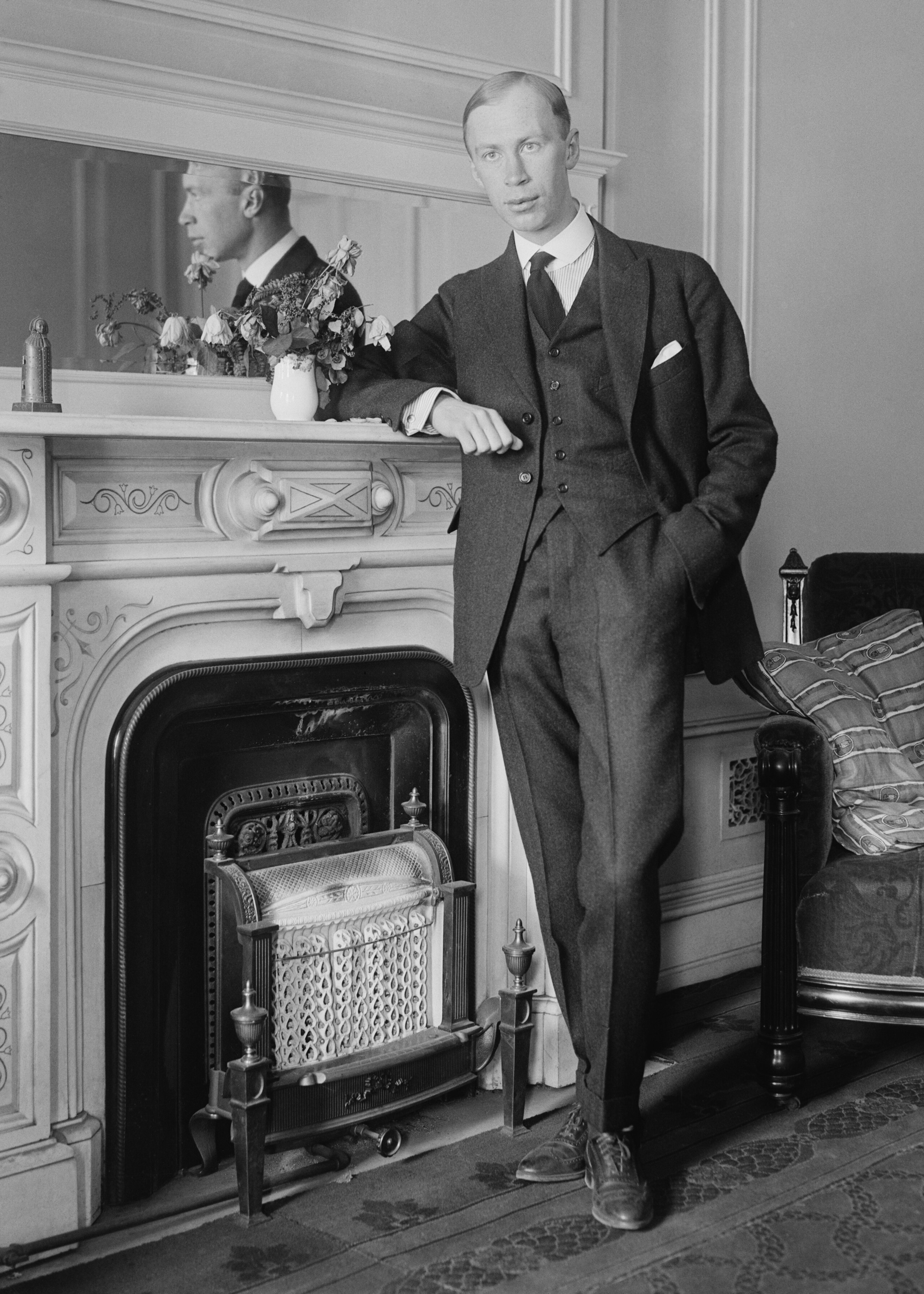
- The composer c. 1918
- Native title: Russian: Семён Котко
- Librettist: Prokofiev; Valentin Katayev
- Language: Russian
- Based on: Katayev's novel I, Son of Working People
- Premiere: 23 June 1940; Stanislavsky Opera Theatre, Moscow

Semyon Kotko (Russian: Семён Котко), Op. 81, is an opera in five acts by Sergei Prokofiev to a libretto by Sergei Prokofiev and Valentin Katayev based on Katayev's 1937 novel I, Son of Working People (Russian: Я, сын трудового народа…). It was premiered on 23 June 1940 at the Stanislavsky Opera Theatre in Moscow.

== Composition history ==
One of only two operas written by Prokofiev on a Soviet subject (the other being The Story of a Real Man), Semyon Kotko was composed between the summers of 1938 and 1939. From the beginning, it was intended that the opera would be produced by the brilliant director and a great friend of Prokofiev, Vsevolod Meyerhold, who was at that time the director of the Stanislavsky Opera Theatre. Both Prokofiev and Meyerhold had tried to plan productions of several of Prokofiev's operas in the past, but all of them had failed. However, on 20 June 1939, just a week before Prokofiev completed the piano score of Semyon Kotko, Meyerhold was arrested. Nothing would be heard about his fate from then on; many years later it was revealed that he had been shot in February 1940. The whole production fell into jeopardy. An actress, Serafima Birman, took Meyerhold's place, but the result was unsatisfactory. The opera was further compromised by the Nazi-Soviet pact, which made it necessary to change the operatic enemies from Germans to haydamaks (Ukrainian nationalists).

== Performance history ==
The reception of Semyon Kotko at its premiere was moderately enthusiastic, but at that time ideology took precedence over all other considerations, and discussions in the press focused exclusively around Semyon Kotko's importance as a "Soviet Opera". The inherent quality of the music was simply ignored. Yet the production made a deep impression on the pianist Sviatoslav Richter, who recalled: "The premiere of the opera was a momentous event in my life [...] That evening, when I first heard Semyon Kotko, I understood that Prokofiev was a great composer."

The opera was dropped from the Soviet repertoire in 1941, and it was not staged again anywhere until 1958 at Brno in Czechoslovakia. It finally entered the repertory of the Bolshoi Theatre in Moscow in 1970, and it is now one of the main repertory staples of the Kirov Opera at the Mariinsky Theatre, St. Petersburg, where it has been repeatedly conducted by Prokofiev interpreter Valery Gergiev.

Prokofiev later extracted an orchestral suite (Op. 81a) from the opera.

== Roles ==
Role	Voice type	Premiere cast 23 June 1940, Moscow (Conductor: Mikhail Zhukov)
Semyon Kotko, a demobilized soldier who loves Sofya	tenor	
Semyon's mother	mezzo-soprano	
Frosya, Semyon's sister who loves Mikola	mezzo-soprano	
Remeniuk, chairman of the village Soviet and commander of a partisan unit	bass	
Tkachenko, a former sergeant-major and Sofya's father	bass	
Khivrya, Tkachenko's wife	mezzo-soprano	
Sofya, Tkachenko's daughter who loves Semyon	soprano	
Tsaryov, a sailor and one of the friends of Semyon who gets hanged by the Germans	baritone	
Lyubka, Tsaryov's fiancée	soprano	
Mikola, a young lad who loves Frosya	tenor	
Ivasenko, an old man and the other one of the friends of Semyon who gets hanged by the Germans	bass	
Workman, the former landowner in the name of Klembovsky	tenor	
Von Wierhof, lieutenant in the German army		
German sergeant		
German interpreter, two old men, three village women, two villagers, young man, Bandura player, two Haydamaks, peasants, partisans, Red Army soldiers, Germans, Haydamaks

== Synopsis ==
Place: Ukraine
Time: 1918.

The newly established Bolshevik government has reached peace with the Germans, but some of their forces still occupy the territory. The advancing Red Army is hampered by Ukrainian nationalists and the remaining Germans. Semyon, a demobilized soldier and prominent young man in his village, is hoping to marry Sofya, daughter of the wealthy Tkachenko. The latter hopes to restore the old order and plots with loyalist elements and Germans to undermine the revolution and to thwart Semyon's marital intentions. In the end, Semyon, after Tkachenko's intrigues have cost the lives of two friends, is reunited with Sofya, and Tkachenko is arrested and executed leaving behind the merry chorus of the Red Army.

== Recordings ==
Year	Cast: Sofya, Frosya, Lyubka, Semyon's mother, Khivrya, Semyon Kotko	Conductor, Opera House and Orchestra	Label
1960	Lyudmila Gelovany, Tamara Antipova, Tatiana Tugarinova, Tamara Yanko, Antonina Klescheva, Nicholai Gress	Mikhail Zhukov, USSR State Radio Symphony Orchestra and Choir	Audio CD: Chandos; Cat: 10053
1999	Tatiana Pavloskaya, Olga Savova, Ekaterina Solovyeva, Ludmila Filatova, Olga Markova-Mikhailenko, Viktor Lutsiuk	Valery Gergiev, Kirov Orchestra and Chorus	Audio CD: Philips; Cat: 464 605–2

=== Suite from Semyon Kotko ===
The orchestral suite, Op. 81a, consists of 8 movements, lasting around 40 minutes.

1. Introduction
2. Semyon and His Mother
3. The Betrothal
4. The Southern Night
5. Execution
6. The Village is Burning
7. Funeral
8. Ours Have Come

=== Recordings of the suite ===
Orchestra	Conductor	Record Company	Year of Recording	Format
Berlin Radio Symphony Orchestra	Rolf Kleinert	Urania	1955	LP
USSR Radio/TV Large Symphony Orchestra	Gennadi Rozhdestvensky	Russian Revelation	1985	CD
Scottish National Orchestra	Neeme Järvi	Chandos	1989	CD
WDR Sinfonieorchester Köln	Michail Jurowski	CPO	1997	CD
St Petersburg State Academic Symphony Orchestra	Alexander Titov	Northern Flowers	2009	CD
