= Mikhail Zhukov (conductor) =

Soviet conductor (1901–1960)

Mikhail Nikolayevich Zhukov
- Михаил Николаевич Жуков
- Born: January 14, 1901; Moscow, Russian Empire
- Died: November 8, 1960; Moscow, Soviet Union
- Burial place: Novodevichy Cemetery
- Occupation(s): Conductor and composer

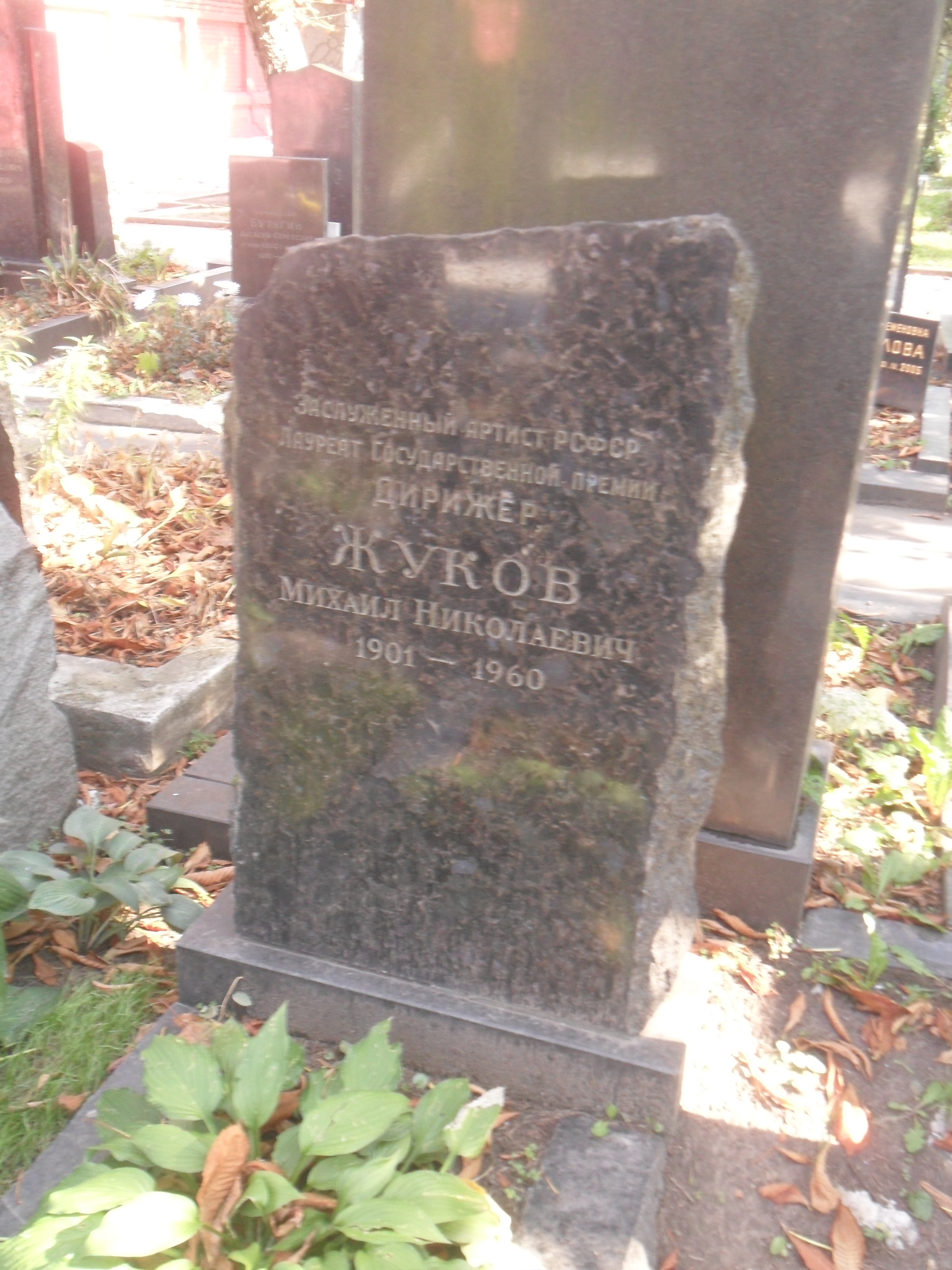

Mikhail Nikolayevich Zhukov (Russian: Михаи́л Никола́евич Жу́ков; 14 January 1901, Moscow – 8 November 1960, Moscow) was a Soviet and Russian conductor and composer.

Zhukov graduated 1918 from the National Choral Academy in Moscow. In 1919-22 he was first concert master, then 1922-32 conductor at the Stanislavski Opera Studio. From 1932-35 conductor at the Leningrad Opera) and then again 1935-38 conductor at the Stanislavsky Opera Studio, and having obtained a diploma in the first all-Soviet conductor's competition in Moscow in 1938, 1939-41 chief conductor there. From 1944-46 he was conductor of Moscow Theatre of Operetta. From 1946-1949 he was conductor of the Latvian Opera and Ballet in Riga with Leonid Vigners. Then from 1951 till his death conductor of the Bolshoi Theatre.

Zhukov is particularly noted for his association with Sergei Prokofiev, having conducted the premiere (1940) and first recording (1960) of Semyon Kotko.

== Awards ==
- Honored Artist of the RSFSR (1941)
- Order of the Red Banner of Labour (1950)
- Stalin Prize, 2nd class (1950)

== Compositions ==
Operas:

- Triumph ("Триумф" 1924)
- The Gadfly ("Овод" 1928) based on The Gadfly by Ethel Voynich.
- Thunderstorm ("Гроза" 1941)
