= For Those Who Are at Sea =

- Russian: За тех, кто в море
- Directed by: Aleksandr Faintsimmer
- Written by: Moisey Kotov; Boris Lavrenyev (play)
- Starring: Mikhail Zharov; Aleksandra Trishko; Dmitri Pavlov; Ninel Myshkova; Gennadi Karnovich-Valua
- Cinematography: Mikhail Magid; Lev Sokolsky
- Music by: Antonio Spadavekkia
- Release date: 1947
- Country: Soviet Union

For Those Who Are at Sea, (Russian: За тех, кто в море) is a 1947 Soviet World War II film directed by Aleksandr Faintsimmer.

== Plot ==
The film tells the story of the sailors who fought on torpedo boats during the Great Patriotic War.

== Cast ==
- Mikhail Zharov as Kharitonov
- Aleksandra Trishko as Sofiya Petrovna
- Dmitri Pavlov as Maksimov
- Ninel Myshkova as Olga Shabunina
- Gennadi Karnovich-Valua as Borovsky
- Elvira Lutsenko as Actress Elena Gorelova (as E. Lutsenko)
- Daniil Sagal as Misha Rekalo
- Ivan Lyubeznov as Lishev
- Pavel Shpringfeld as Andrei Klobukov
- Georgiy Kurovskiy as Shubin
- Stepan Krylov as Gudkov
- Mikhail Dubrava as Opanasenko
