= The Gadfly (play) =

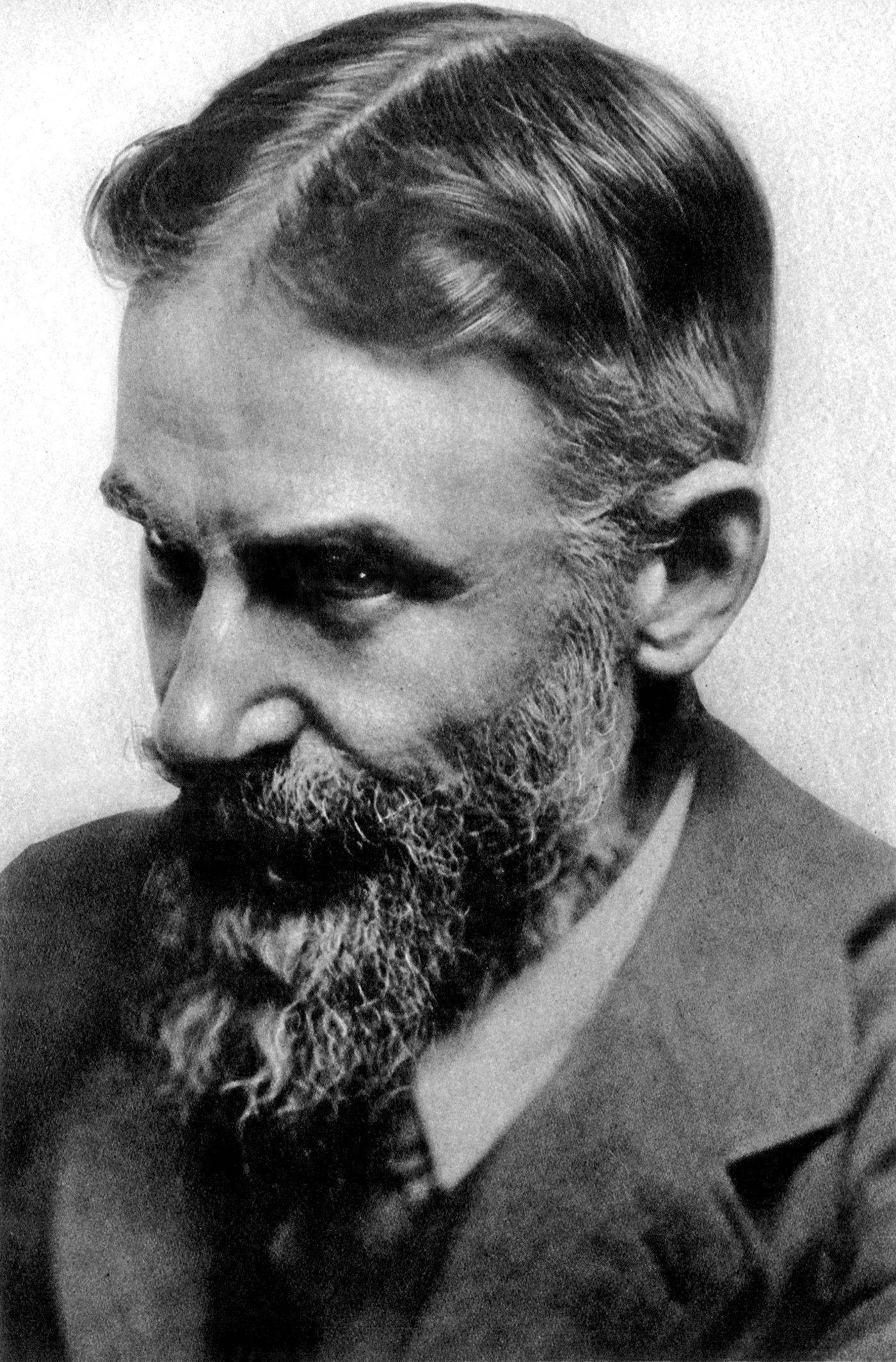
- Original language: English
- Written by: George Bernard Shaw
- Subject: A devout Catholic becomes a devout revolutionary.
- Genre: novel adaptation
- Setting: various

Premiere
- Date: unproduced

The Gadfly or The Son of the Cardinal (1897-8) is a dramatic adaptation by George Bernard Shaw of Anglo-Irish writer Ethel Lilian Voynich (née Boole)'s novel The Gadfly. It was written as a favour to the author, who was a friend of Shaw's.

== Creation ==
The Gadfly, a novel about a young man's embrace of revolutionary politics, had been an enormous success for Voynich. She had asked Shaw to create a dramatised version for copyright reasons, as she wished to retain control over dramatic versions of the book. Shaw had to write it very quickly to assert priority. Shaw said he undertook the task for an "ancient revolutionary comrade", referring to Voynich as a "female nihilist". Writing to Ellen Terry on 29 January 1898, he said he was overwhelmed with work: "What a week! Nay, a fortnight! Three first nights, two County Council election meetings, four Vestry committees, one Fabian committee, a pamphlet to write about the Southwark police business (just completed), an adaptation of a novel--, the Julius Caesar article, and one frightful headache. There's a program for you--!"

== Plot ==
Arthur Burton is a devout Catholic who wishes to become a priest. While studying in Italy in the early stages of the Risorgimento he converts from Catholicism to radicalism, much to the dismay of his mentor in the priesthood. He travels to South America, and eventually returns to become a revolutionary writer under the pen name "the gadfly".

== Rival version ==
Shaw's version was never produced on stage. Voynich's fears were justified when a few months later an adaptation was written in America by Edward E. Rose, with popular actor Stuart Robson in the lead role. The dramatisation was described as "an illiterate melodrama" by Voynich. She threatened an injunction, and Robson was forced to apologise and withdraw the play. The Los Angeles Herald reported that Voynich's view of the production was entirely accurate: "Had one a wish to deal gently with Mr. Robson it would be hard to give him any honest praise for the exhibition of incompetency to which we were treated in The Gadfly."

Though Shaw's version was the first, the novel was later dramatised and filmed many times.

== Publication ==
The play was published in the 1970-4 Bodley Head edition of Shaw's Collected Plays and Prefaces.
