= 2032 Ethel =

Main-belt asteroid

Discovery
- Discovered by: T. Smirnova
- Discovery site: Crimean Astrophysical Obs.
- Discovery date: 30 July 1970

Designations
- Named after: Ethel Voynich (Irish writer)
- Alternative designations: 1970 OH · 1952 DU; 1960 WM · 1965 UG_{1} 1971 UD_{3}
- Minor planet category: main-belt · (outer) background

Orbital characteristics
- Epoch 4 September 2017 (JD 2458000.5)
- Uncertainty parameter 0
- Observation arc: 65.18 yr (23,807 days)
- Aphelion: 3.4615 AU
- Perihelion: 2.6831 AU
- Semi-major axis: 3.0723 AU
- Eccentricity: 0.1267
- Orbital period (sidereal): 5.39 yr (1,967 days)
- Mean anomaly: 269.94°
- Mean motion: 0° 10^{m} 58.8^{s} / day
- Inclination: 1.5097°
- Longitude of ascending node: 30.178°
- Argument of perihelion: 295.71°

Physical characteristics
- Dimensions: 36.007±0.105 km
- Geometric albedo: 0.034±0.005
- Absolute magnitude (H): 11.4

2032 Ethel, provisional designation 1970 OH, is a dark background asteroid from the outer regions of the asteroid belt, approximately 36 kilometers in diameter. It was discovered on 30 July 1970, by Soviet astronomer Tamara Smirnova at the Crimean Astrophysical Observatory in Nauchnyj, on the Crimean peninsula. The asteroid was named after Irish writer Ethel Voynich.

== Orbit and classification ==
Ethel is a non-family asteroid of the main belt's background population. It orbits the Sun in the outer asteroid belt at a distance of 2.7–3.5 AU once every 5 years and 5 months (1,967 days; semi-major axis 3.07 AU). Its orbit has an eccentricity of 0.13 and an inclination of 2° with respect to the ecliptic.

The body's observation arc begins with its identification as 1952 DU at Goethe Link Observatory in February 1952, more than 18 years prior to its official discovery observation Nauchnyj.

== Physical characteristics ==
=== Diameter and albedo ===
According to the survey carried out by the NEOWISE mission of NASA's Wide-field Infrared Survey Explorer, Ethel measures 36.007 kilometers in diameter and its surface has an albedo of 0.034.

=== Rotation period ===
As of 2017, no rotational lightcurve of Ethel has been obtained from photometric observations. The body's rotation period, poles and shape remain unknown.

== Naming ==
This minor planet was named after Ethel Lilian Voynich (1864–1960), an Irish writer of the late Victorian epoch, best known for her novel The Gadfly. The official naming citation was published by the Minor Planet Center on 1 September 1978 (M.P.C. 4482).
