= A Girl with Guitar =

1958 Soviet musical comedy film

- Directed by: Alexander Feinzimmer
- Written by: Boris Laskin; Vladimir Polyakov
- Starring: Lyudmila Gurchenko; Mikhail Zharov; Faina Ranevskaya
- Music by: Yury Saulsky; Arkady Ostrovsky
- Production company: Mosfilm
- Release date: September 1, 1958
- Running time: 93 minutes
- Country: Soviet Union
- Language: Russian

A Girl with Guitar (Russian: Девушка с гитарой, romanized: Devushka s gitaroy) is 1958 Soviet musical comedy film directed by Alexander Feinzimmer.

After the success of the film Carnival Night starring Lyudmila Gurchenko the script of the film A Girl with Guitar was written counting on her popularity.

The film was shot on the eve of the 6th World Festival of Youth and Students, held in Moscow in the summer of 1957, and became the first Soviet feature film dedicated to this significant event. The film premiered on September 1, 1958.

The film was a success with the audience. At the end of the year, А Girl with Guitar took the tenth place in the attendance rating, gathering over 31.9 million viewers, although it could not repeat the success of Carnival Night.

== Plot ==
Pretty salesgirl of the music store Tanya Fedosova (Lyudmila Gurchenko) dreams of becoming an actress. She often sings. There are always a lot of customers around her. But they annoy the shop director (Mikhail Zharov), who is afraid of losing a valuable employee. He tries to prevent the possible career of Tanya, who has all the data to become an actress. Acquaintance of the girl with the young composer (Vladimir Gusev) helps her dream to come true.

== Cast ==
According to kino-teatr.ru:

- Lyudmila Gurchenko as Tanya Fedosova
- Mikhail Zharov as Arkady Sviristinsky
- Vladimir Gusev as composer Korzikov
- Faina Ranevskaya as Zoya Sviristinskaya
- Yuri Nikulin as pyrotechnic
- Sergey Blinnikov as Vasily Fedosov, Tanya's father
- Boris Petker as Apollon Starobarabantsev
- Oleg Anofriev as Vanya Savushkin
- Larisa Kronberg as cashier
- Sergey Filippov as Mamin
- Boris Novikov as Tsyplakov
- Mikhail Pugovkin as Penkin
- Sergey Golovanov as Kolosov, Chairman of the jury
- Svetlana Kharitonova as customer
- Georgy Vitsin as buyer
- Evgeny Kudryashev as the contestant who told the fable
- Valentin Bryleev as buyer (uncredited)
- Gigi Marga as singer from Bucharest (uncredited)
- Zinaida Sorochinskaya as shopper (uncredited)

== Critical reception ==
Some criticism met the film with hostility:"To the light genre by the... easy way", "In captivity of bad taste" said headlines some Soviet newspapers. Gurchenko gained a reputation the actress of the lung and musical genre.

This film was the debut for Yuri Nikulin. He performed episodic role of the unlucky pyrotechnics so vividly that both the spectators and the directors immediately turned their attention to the novice actor.

The Guardian, described the film as "bouncy, colour musical full of spectacular numbers, in which Gurchenko plays a pretty young clerk in a Moscow music shop, who sings several songs enchantingly".
