= Men of the Sea =

- Directed by: Aleksandr Faintsimmer
- Written by: Frederick Marryat (novel Mr Midshipman Easy); Aleksandr Shtein (writer); Aleksandr Zenovin (writer)
- Starring: See below
- Cinematography: Svyatoslav Belyayev
- Music by: Vladimir Sherbachev
- Production company: Belgoskino
- Release date: 2 January 1938
- Running time: 83 minutes
- Country: Soviet Union
- Language: Russian

Men of the Sea also known as Baltic Sailors (Russian: Балтийцы, romanized: Baltiytsy) is a 1938 Soviet war film directed by Aleksandr Faintsimmer. The film is about the Bolshevik Kronstadt sailors' 1919 defense of Petrograd from the White Army during the Russian Civil War.

== Plot ==
In Kronstadt, there is emptiness. The Baltic sailors are at the front. With the help of a British landing force, General M. Yudenich's troops are advancing on Petrograd...

On one of the anxious days of 1918, a Bolshevik named Vikhoryev returns from the front with a detachment of sailors. That same night, he is summoned to the Kronstadt Revolutionary Military Council, where Central Committee member Vavilov informs him that Vikhoryev has been appointed as the commissar of a destroyer division.

On the flagship destroyer Gavriil, Vikhoryev finds complete disorganization, with the sailors openly mocking the ship's commander. Bolshevik Vikhoryev imposes "iron revolutionary order" on the ship. Under his influence, the crew changes: sailor Fedya Kolosov, who had been removed from the ship for disorganization, dies heroically for the revolution at the end of the film. In the subsequent battles, the Baltic sailors demonstrate consciousness, courage, and dedication to their cause.

It is now 1919. Anti-Bolshevik uprisings flare up in the Kronstadt forts of "Krasnaya Gorka" and "Seraya Loshad." A detachment of sailors under Vikhoryev's command is sent to suppress them. Under the pressure of Bolshevik forces, the forts surrender. The next morning, British torpedo boats appear on the horizon, speeding towards Soviet ships. The Bolshevik fleet opens fire, forcing the British to retreat into the open sea.

A traitor who has infiltrated the Gavriil directs the flagship destroyer towards a mine. After a powerful explosion, the ship begins to sink. Trying to inform the Soviet command about the enemy's landing, signalman Kolosov climbs the mast and signals the necessary message with a flashlight. A minute later, the ship sinks with its crew, accompanied by the song "The Internationale."

The Soviet forces avenge the deaths of their comrades by completely destroying the British landing force.

== Cast ==
- Pyotr Gofman as Pilot Bezenchuk
- Galina Inyutina as Glafira
- Pyotr Kirillov as Dietrich
- Vladimir Kryuger as Gunner Zheslov
- Boris Livanov as Commissar Vikhoriev
- Konstantin Matrossov as Lavretski
- Vasiliy Safranov as Vaviloo
- Leonid Smit as Signal Man Kolessov
- Konstantin Sorokin as Orderly
- Vladimir Uralsky as Machinist Khoritonich
- Leonid Viven as Commander Rostovtsev
