= Ethel Voynich =

Irish writer and musician (1864–1960)

Ethel Lilian Voynich
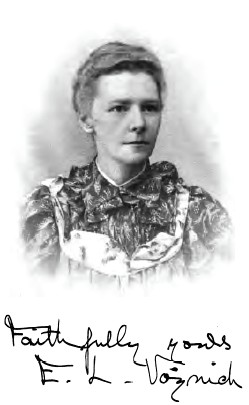
- Portrait, 1902
- Born: Ethel Lilian Boole; 11 May 1864; Ballintemple, Cork, County Cork, Ireland
- Died: 27 July 1960 (aged 96); New York City, United States
- Occupations: Novelist, musician
- Spouses: Wilfrid Voynich; (1902–1930, his death)
- Relatives: George Boole (father); Mary Everest (mother)
- Writing career
- Notable work: The Gadfly

Ethel Lilian Voynich (née Boole; 11 May 1864 – 27 July 1960) was an Irish-born novelist and musician, and a supporter of several revolutionary causes. She was born in Cork, but grew up in Lancashire, England.

Voynich was a significant figure, not only on the late Victorian literary scene, but also in Russian émigré circles. She is best known for her novel The Gadfly, which became hugely popular in her lifetime, especially in the Soviet Union.

== Life ==
Ethel Lilian Boole was born on 11 May 1864, at Lichfield Cottage, Blackrock, Ballintemple, Cork, the youngest daughter of English parents, mathematician George Boole (inventor of Boolean logic), and mathematician and educationalist Mary Everest, who was the niece of George Everest and a writer for Crank, an early-20th-century periodical. Her father died six months after she was born. Her mother returned to her native England with her daughters, and was able to live off a small government pension until she was appointed librarian at Queen's College, London. When she was eight, Ethel contracted erysipelas, a disease associated with poor sanitation. Her mother decided to send her to live in Lancashire with her brother, who was manager of a coal mine, believing that it would be good for her health. Described as "a religious fanatic and sadist", who regularly beat his children, he apparently forced Ethel to play the piano for hours on end. Ethel returned to London at the age of ten. She became withdrawn, dressing in black and calling herself "Lily".

At the age of eighteen, she gained access to a legacy. This allowed her to study piano and musical composition at the Hochschule für Musik in Berlin, which she attended between 1882 and 1885. During this period, she became increasingly attracted to revolutionary politics. Back in London she learned Russian from Sergei Kravchinski, known as Stepniak, who encouraged her to go to Russia. From 1887 to 1889, she worked as a governess in St. Petersburg, where she stayed with Kravchinski's sister-in-law, Preskovia Karauloff. Through her, she became associated with the revolutionary Narodniks. Having learned Kravchinski's native Ukrainian language, Ethel became fascinated with the poems of Taras Shevchenko and translated many them into English. On behalf of Kravchinski she also visited Lviv, where she met Ukrainian writer Ivan Franko and was said to have an affair with Sidney Reilly, who stayed at the city's George Hotel. After her return to the UK, she settled in London, where she became involved in pro-Revolutionary activity. With Kravchinski she founded the Society of Friends of Russian Freedom, and helped to edit Free Russia, the Narodniks's English-language journal.

In 1890, she met Michał Habdank-Wojnicz, a Polish revolutionary who had escaped from Siberia. Soon he also became Ethel Boole's life-partner. By 1895, they were living together and she was calling herself Mrs. Voynich. They married in 1902. In 1904, he anglicised his name to Wilfrid Michael Voynich and became an antiquarian book dealer. In that capacity he eventually gave his name to the Voynich manuscript.

In 1897, Ethel Voynich published The Gadfly, which was an immediate international success. She published three more novels, Jack Raymond (1901), Olive Latham (1904) and An Interrupted Friendship (1910), but none attained the popularity of her first book.

The Voyniches emigrated to the United States in 1920, after Wilfrid had moved the bulk of his book business to New York. Ethel concentrated more on music from this point on, working in a music school, but she continued her literary career as a translator from Russian, Polish and French. A final novel, Put Off Thy Shoes, was published in 1945.

Voynich was unaware of the vast sales of The Gadfly in the Soviet Union until she was visited in New York by a Russian diplomat in 1955, who told her how highly regarded she was in the country. The following year, Adlai Stevenson secured an agreement for the payment of US$15,000 in royalties to her.

Ethel Lilian Voynich died on 27 July 1960 at the age of 96. In accordance with her will, her body was cremated and the ashes scattered over Central Park in New York City.

=== Alleged affair with Reilly ===
According to the British journalist Robin Bruce Lockhart, Sidney Reilly – a Russian-born operative employed by the émigré intelligence network of Scotland Yard's Special Branch – met Ethel Voynich in London in 1895. Lockhart, whose father, R. H. Bruce Lockhart, knew Reilly, claims that Reilly and Voynich had a sexual liaison and voyaged to Italy together. During their romance Reilly is said to have bared his soul and revealed to her the story of his espionage activities. After their brief affair, Voynich published The Gadfly, whose central character Arthur Burton was based on Reilly. In 2004, writer Andrew Cook suggested that Reilly may have been reporting on Voynich and her political activities to William Melville of the Metropolitan Police Special Branch. In 2016, new evidence surfaced from archived communication between Anne Fremantle, who attempted a biography of Ethel Voynich, and a relative of Ethel's on the Hinton side. The evidence indicates that a liaison of some sort took place between Reilly and her in Florence in 1895.

== Work ==
=== The Gadfly ===
She is most famous for her first novel The Gadfly, first published in 1897 in the United States (June) and Britain (September), about the struggles of an international revolutionary in Italy who was loosely based on the figure of Giuseppe Mazzini. This novel was very popular in the Soviet Union and was the top bestseller and compulsory reading there, where it was seen as ideologically useful; for similar reasons, the novel has been popular in the People's Republic of China as well. By the time of Voynich's death The Gadfly had sold an estimated 2,500,000 copies in the Soviet Union and had been made into two Russian movies, first in 1928 in Soviet Georgia (Krazana) and then again in 1955.

Historian Mark Mazower describes The Gadfly as ‘a radical fin de siècle English novel’ translated into Yiddish by his grandfather, Max Mazower, being published in 1907 in Vilna, then part of the Russian Empire, now Vilnius, Lithuania. Its dramatic story serves as an allegory for the struggle for liberty in Russia. Not only did it circulate widely among socialists in Russia, it appealed enormously to people of progressive ideas elsewhere with soaring popularity in Britain towards the end of the First World War. Sidney Reilly, the famous British “Ace of Spies,” is said to have either modelled himself on or served as a model for Voynich's hero. Reilly, in turn, was used by Ian Fleming as a model for James Bond, the most famous fictional spy of the Cold War.

The 1955 film of the novel, by the Soviet director Aleksandr Fajntsimmer, is noted for the fact that composer Dmitri Shostakovich wrote the score (see The Gadfly Suite). Along with some other excerpts, the Romance movement has since become very popular. Shostakovich's Gadfly theme was also used in the 1980s, in the ITV TV series Reilly, Ace of Spies. In 1980, the novel was adapted again as a TV miniseries The Gadfly, featuring Sergei Bondarchuk as Father Montanelli. Various other adaptations exist, including at least three operas and two ballets.

=== Other novels ===
Voynich's other four novels never achieved the same success as The Gadfly, but two of them extended its narrative. An Interrupted Friendship (1910) elaborates on The Gadfly's protagonist's backstory, and Put Off Thy Shoes (1945), Voynich's last novel, further focuses on the life of the protagonist's family and ancestors; a "lengthy, multi-generational chronicle" set in the 18th century.

Her second novel, Jack Raymond (1901), was quickly followed by her third, Olive Latham (1904). Nearly a decade later, Voynich took a hiatus from writing and focused on music.

=== Music ===
Voynich began composing music around 1910. She joined the Society of Women Musicians during World War I. After she and her husband moved to New York, she devoted herself much more to music, creating many adaptations and transcriptions of existing works. In 1931 she published an edited volume of Chopin's letters.

From 1933 to 1943 she worked at the Pius X School of Liturgical Music in Manhattan. While there she composed a number of cantatas and other works that were performed at the college, including Babylon, Jerusalem, Epitaph in Ballad Form and The Submerged City. She also researched the history of music, compiling detailed commentaries on music of various eras.

Most of her music remains unpublished and is held at the Library of Congress. Recent evaluation in 2005 of the cantata Babylon by an eminent English composer was not very favourable. 'The general impression is of amateurism and gaucheness'.

== Legacy ==
A minor planet called 2032 Ethel that was discovered in 1970 by Soviet astronomer Tamara Mikhailovna Smirnova is named after her.

Voynich's novel The Gadfly features prominently in the novel Solenoid by Mircea Cărtărescu, which tells the story of a Romanian high school teacher who was heavily influenced by the novel as a child.

== Works ==
=== Translations ===
- Stories from Garshin (1893)
- Nihilism As It Is (1894)
- The Humour of Russia (1895)
- 6 Lyrics from the Ruthenian of Tarás Shevchénko (1911)
- Chopin's Letters (1931)

=== Standalone Novels ===
- Jack Raymond (1901)
- Olive Latham (1904)

=== Arthur Burton Trilogy ===
1. Put Off Thy Shoes (1945)
2. The Gadfly Part 1 (1897)
3. An Interrupted Friendship (Russian "Овод в изгнании" (meaning "The Gadfly in exile") (1910)
4. The Gadfly Parts 2 and 3 (1897)

== See also ==
- Krazana, a 1928 Georgian black-and-white silent film directed by Kote Marjanishvili
- The Gadfly, a 1955 film by Soviet director Aleksandr Fajntsimmer
- The Gadfly Suite, composed by Dmitri Shostakovich for the 1955 film adaptation
- The Gadfly, 1958 opera by Soviet composer Antonio Spadavecchia
- The Gadfly, a 1980 TV miniseries
