= Gadfly (database) =

Relational database management system

- Developer: Aaron Robert Watters
- Release: 1994; 32 years ago
- Stable release: 1.0 / January 5, 2005; 21 years ago
- Written in: Python
- Operating system: Cross-platform
- Type: Relational Database Management System
- License: Python License
- Website: gadfly.sourceforge.net

Gadfly is a relational database management system written in Python. Gadfly is a collection of Python modules that provides relational database functionality entirely implemented in Python. It supports a subset of the standard RDBMS Structured Query Language (SQL).

Gadfly runs wherever Python runs and supports client/server on any platform that supports the standard Python socket interface. The file formats used by Gadfly for storage are cross-platform—a gadfly database directory can be moved from Windows 95 to Linux using a binary copying mechanism and gadfly will read and run the database.

It supports persistent databases consisting of a collection of structured tables with indices, and a large subset of SQL for accessing and modifying those tables. It supports a log-based recovery protocol which allows committed operations of a database to be recovered even if the database was not shut down in a proper manner (i.e., in the event of a CPU or software crash, [but not in the event of a disk crash]). It also supports a TCP/IP Client/Server mode where remote clients can access a Gadfly database over a TCP/IP network (such as the Internet) subject to configurable security mechanisms.

Since Gadfly depends intimately on the kwParsing package it is distributed as part of the kwParsing package, under the same copyright.

Gadfly allows Python programs to store, retrieve and query tabular data without having to rely on any external database engine or package. It provides an in-memory relational database style engine for Python programs, complete with a notion of a "committed, recoverable transaction" and "aborts".

== Usage ==
The main "gadfly" module attempts to faithfully adhere to Greg Stein's Python Database API, as discussed and certified by the Python DB-SIG.

Concurrent database updates are not supported. The "databases" are currently designed to be written/modified by one process in isolation. Multiple processes can access a Gadfly database when accesses are arbitrated by a TCP/IP Gadfly server process.

=== Creating a new database ===
Unlike most Python/database-engine interfaces Gadfly databases must be created using Python. To accomplish this programmers use:

import gadfly
connection = gadfly.gadfly()

with no arguments. Then they startup a database using the startup method:

connection.startup("mydatabase", "mydirectory")

Here "mydirectory" must be a directory which exists and which can be written to in order to store the database files. The startup creates some files in "mydirectory". This has the effect of clobbering any existing Gadfly database called "mydatabase" in the directory "mydirectory". Gadfly will not allow a start up the same connection twice, however.

The first "import gadfly" reads in and initializes some rather large data structures used for parsing SQL, and thus may take longer than other module imports.

Within the database the user can create tables, populate them, and commit the result when they are happy:

cursor = connection.cursor()
cursor.execute("CREATE TABLE ph (nm VARCHAR, ph VARCHAR)")
cursor.execute("INSERT INTO ph(nm, ph) VALUES ('arw', '3367')")
cursor.execute("SELECT * FROM ph")
for x in cursor.fetchall():
    print x
    # prints ('arw', '3367')
connection.commit()

=== Reconnecting to an existing database ===
Once a database exists it can be reconnected to:

import gadfly
connection = gadfly.gadfly("mydatabase", "mydirectory")

This will read in the database tables with the most recently committed values. The initialized database is then queried and updated:

cursor = connection.cursor()
cursor.execute("UPDATE ph SET nm='aaron' WHERE nm='arw'")
cursor.execute("SELECT * FROM ph")
for x in cursor.fetchall():
    print x
    # prints ('aaron', '3367')

If the user does not want to commit updates then the do not execute a commit on the connection object (which writes out the tables). To restore the old values from the existing database they use:

connection.abort()

Updates are only stored upon a connection.commit(). [Actually, if autocheckpoint is disabled, updates are only stored to table files on checkpoint—see the documentation on the recovery mechanism.]

print cursor.pp()

to "pretty print" the result of any evaluation (which might be None for a non-select).

=== Features ===
In this version all tables are read into memory upon "connecting" to the database and "touched" tables are written out upon checkpoint. Each table is represented as a separate file in the destination directory, and there is a "data definition" file as well (a list of data definition declarations). During active use a log file appears in the active directory as well, and if the process crashes this log file is used to recover committed operations.

==== The SELECT statement ====
At this point Gadfly supports quite a lot of the SQL semantics requested in the ODBC 2.0 specification. SQL statements supported include the SELECT:

SELECT [DISTINCT|ALL] expressions or *
  FROM tables
    [WHERE condition]
    [GROUP BY group-expressions]
    [HAVING aggregate-condition]
    [union-clause]
    [ORDER BY columns]

This statement is quite powerful. It reads as follows:

1. Make all combinations of rows from the tables (FROM line)
2. Eliminate those combinations not satisfying condition (WHERE line)
3. (if GROUP present) form aggregate groups that match on group-expressions
4. (if HAVING present) eliminate aggregate groups that don't satisfy the aggregate-condition.
5. compute the columns to keep (SELECT line).
6. (if union-clause present) combine (union, difference, intersect) the result with the result of another select statement.
7. if DISTINCT, throw out redundant entries.
8. (if ORDER present) order the result by the columns (ascending or descending as specified, with precedence as listed).

The actual implementation in gadfly is much better than the intuitive reading, particularly at steps 1 and 2 (which are combined via optimizing transformations and hash join algorithms).

Conditions may include equalities, and inequalities of expressions. Conditions may also be combined using AND, OR, NOT. Expressions include column names, constants, and standard arithmetic operations over them.

Embedded queries supported include subquery expressions, expr IN (subselect), quantified comparisons, and the EXISTS (subselect) predicate.

Aggregate tests and computations can only be applied after the GROUPing and before the columns are selected (steps 3,4,5). Aggregate operations include COUNT(*), COUNT(expression), AVG(expression), SUM(expression), MAX(expression), MIN(expression), and the non-standard MEDIAN(expression). These may be applied to DISTINCT values (throwing out redundancies, as in COUNT(DISTINCT drinker). if no GROUPing is present the aggregate computations apply to the entire result after step 2.

There is much more to know about the SELECT statement. The test suite test/test_gadfly.py gives numerous examples of SELECT statements.

==== Table creation and "data types" ====
Create tables using the CREATE TABLE statement:

CREATE TABLE name (colname datatype [, colname datatype...])

Data types currently "supported" are integer, float, and varchar. They are ignored by the implementation, anything that is hashable and marshallable can currently go in any column (but that is likely to change). For example:

CREATE TABLE frequents
(drinker VARCHAR,
bar VARCHAR,
perweek INTEGER)

At present tuples, complexes, or anything else can be put into a column specified as "VARCHAR".

==== Other supported statements ====
Gadfly also supports the searched DELETE and UPDATE; INSERT VALUES and INSERT subselect; CREATE/DROP INDEX, and DROP TABLE. These have the informal syntax:

DELETE FROM table WHERE condition
UPDATE table SET col=expr [, col=expr...] WHERE condition
INSERT INTO table [(column [, column...])] VALUES (value [, value...])
INSERT INTO table [(column [, column...])] subselect
CREATE [UNIQUE] INDEX name ON table (column [, column...])
DROP TABLE table
DROP INDEX name

Multiple statements may be executed in one cursor.execute(S) by separating the statements with semicolons in S, for example S might have the string value:

DROP INDEX tdindex;
DROP TABLE templikes

SQL is case insensitive.

==== Dynamic values ====
Expressions also include the special expression '?' (the ODBC-style dynamic expression) as in:

insertstat = "INSERT INTO ph(nm,ph) VALUES (?, ?)"
cursor.execute(insertstat, ('nan', "0356"))
cursor.execute(insertstat, ('bill', "2356"))
cursor.execute(insertstat, ('tom', "4356"))

Dynamic values allow the cursor to use the same parsed expression many times for a similar operation. Above the insertstat is parsed and bound to the database only once. Using dynamic attributes should speed up accesses. Thus the above should run much faster than the equivalent:

cursor.execute("INSERT INTO ph(nm,ph) VALUES ('nan', '0356')")
cursor.execute("INSERT INTO ph(nm,ph) VALUES ('bill', '2356')")
cursor.execute("INSERT INTO ph(nm,ph) VALUES ('tom', '4356')")

Dynamic attributes can appear in other statements containing expressions (such as SELECTs, UPDATEs and DELETEs too).

For SELECT, UPDATE, and DELETE the dynamic expression substitutions must consist of a single tuple, as in:

  stat = "SELECT * FROM ph WHERE nm=?"
  cursor.execute(stat, ("nan",))
  ...
  cursor.execute(stat, ("bob",))
  ...

Since the dynamic substitution eliminates the need for parsing and binding (expensive operations!) the above should run faster than the equivalent:

 cursor.execute("SELECT * FROM ph WHERE nm='nan'")
 ...
 cursor.execute("SELECT * FROM ph WHERE nm='bob'")
 ...

If several similar queries are repeated multiple times, each query "template string" is associated with a unique cursor object so that each template must be parsed and bound only once. Some relatively complex queries from the test suite run 2 to 3 times faster after they have been parsed and bound, even without the kjbuckets builtin. With kjbuckets the same ran 5 to 10 times faster.

==== Multiple batch inserts and dynamic values ====
For the special case of INSERT VALUES a list of substitution tuples allows the query engine to perform the inserts in optimized batch mode. Thus the fastest way to perform the three inserts given earlier is:

data = [('nan', "0356")), ('bill', "2356"), ('tom', "4356")]
stat = "INSERT INTO ph(nm,ph) VALUES (?, ?)"
cursor.execute(stat, data)

It would be even faster if the cursor had previously executed the stat with different data (since then no parsing or binding would occur).

==== Introspection ====
By default a gadfly database automatically includes "introspective" tables which allow a gadfly query to "query the shape of the database"—for example to view table names and names of rows in tables:

>>> g = gadfly()
>>> g.startup("dbtest", "dbtest")
>>> c = g.cursor()
>>> c.execute("select * from __table_names__")
>>> print c.pp()
IS_VIEW | TABLE_NAME
=========================
1       | __TABLE_NAMES__
1       | DUAL
1       | __DATADEFS__
1       | __COLUMNS__
1       | __INDICES__
1       | __INDEXCOLS__

Here DUAL is a standard one row/one column test table (from the Oracle tradition) and the other tables provide information about the database schema:

>>> c.execute("create table t1 (a varchar, b varchar)")
>>> c.execute("create table t2 (b varchar, c varchar)")
>>> c.execute("create unique index t1a on t1(a)")
>>> c.execute("create index t1b on t1(b)")
>>> c.execute("select * from __table_names__")
>>> print c.pp()
IS_VIEW | TABLE_NAME
=========================
0       | T1
1       | __DATADEFS__
1       | __INDICES__
0       | T2
1       | __TABLE_NAMES__
1       | __COLUMNS__
1       | DUAL
1       | __INDEXCOLS__
>>> c.execute("select * from __columns__")
>>> print c.pp()
COLUMN_NAME | TABLE_NAME
=============================
A           | T1
B           | T1
NAME        | __DATADEFS__
DEFN        | __DATADEFS__
INDEX_NAME  | __INDICES__
TABLE_NAME  | __INDICES__
IS_UNIQUE   | __INDICES__
TABLE_NAME  | __TABLE_NAMES__
IS_VIEW     | __TABLE_NAMES__
B           | T2
C           | T2
COLUMN1     | DUAL
TABLE_NAME  | __COLUMNS__
COLUMN_NAME | __COLUMNS__
INDEX_NAME  | __INDEXCOLS__
COLUMN_NAME | __INDEXCOLS__
>>> c.execute("select * from __indices__")
>>> print c.pp()
IS_UNIQUE | TABLE_NAME | INDEX_NAME
===================================
0         | T1         | T1B
1         | T1         | T1A
>>> c.execute("select * from __indexcols__")
>>> print c.pp()
COLUMN_NAME | INDEX_NAME
========================
B           | T1B
A           | T1A
>>> c.execute("select * from dual")
>>> print c.pp()
COLUMN1
=======
0

=== Interactive testing ===
After installation, the created database can be interactively tested from the same directory using the interactive interpreter:

Python 2.1.3 (#1, Apr 30 2002, 19:37:40)
[GCC 2.96 20000731 (Red Hat Linux 7.1 2.96-96)] on linux2
Type "copyright", "credits" or "license" for more information.
>>>
>>> from gadfly import gadfly
>>> connection = gadfly("test", "dbtest")
>>> cursor = connection.cursor()
>>> cursor.execute("select * from frequents")
>>> cursor.description
(('DRINKER', None, None, None, None, None, None), ('PERWEEK', None, None,
None, None, None, None), ('BAR', None, None, None, None, None, None))
>>> print cursor.pp()
DRINKER | PERWEEK | BAR
============================
adam    | 1       | lolas
woody   | 5       | cheers
sam     | 5       | cheers
norm    | 3       | cheers
wilt    | 2       | joes
norm    | 1       | joes
lola    | 6       | lolas
norm    | 2       | lolas
woody   | 1       | lolas
pierre  | 0       | frankies
>>>

== Architecture ==
The SQL grammar is described in grammar.py, the binding of the grammar constructs to semantic objects is performed in bindings.py, the semantic objects and their execution strategies is defined in semantics.py. The semantics use a lot of classical and non-classical logic (cylindric logic) as well as optimization heuristics to define a relatively efficient and correct implementation of SQL.

The most basic data structures of the implementation are given in either kjbuckets0.py or the faster kjbucketsmodule.c, which implement the same data type signatures in Python and in a C extension to Python respectively.

The database.py module is a simple wrapper that provides a standard DBAPI interface to the system.

The test suite test/test_gadfly.py attempts to provide a regression test and a demonstration of the system.

The SQL parser also requires the kwParsing parser generation package, which consists of a number of additional python modules.

== Tools ==
With gfplus a gadfly database can be interactively manipulated with SQL commands. The tool works similar to Oracle's SQL*Plus.

== Concurrency ==
Because it lacks true concurrency control and file-system based indexing it is not appropriate for very large multiprocess transaction-based systems.

Two applications may access the same database concurrently. However, changes made by one application may not be seen by the other application until after it restarts. This may be because each application loads the database in-memory at startup only.
