= The Gadfly =

1897 novel by Ethel Lilian Voynich

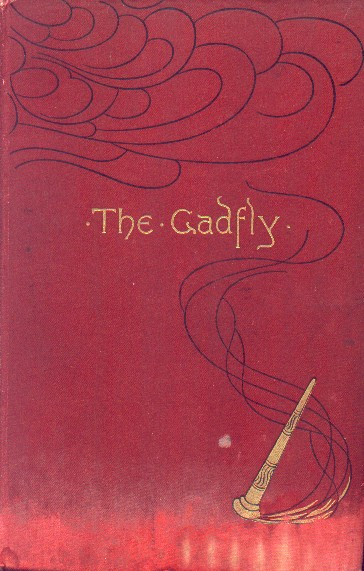
- First version of cover
- Author: Ethel Voynich
- Language: English
- Genre: Novel
- Publisher: H. Holt
- Publication date: June 1897
- Publication place: United States
- Media type: Print (hardback and paperback)
- Pages: 373 pp (first edition hardcover)

The Gadfly is a novel by Irish-born writer Ethel Voynich, published in 1897 (United States, June; Great Britain, September of the same year), set in 1840s Italy under the dominance of Austria, a time of tumultuous revolt and uprisings. The story centres on the life of the protagonist, Arthur Burton. A thread of a tragic relationship between Arthur and his love, Gemma, simultaneously runs through the story. It is a tale of faith, disillusionment, revolution, romance, and heroism.

== Themes ==
The book, set during the Italian Risorgimento, is primarily concerned with the culture of revolution and revolutionaries. Arthur, the eponymous Gadfly, embodies the tragic Romantic hero, who comes of age and returns from abandonment to discover his true state in the world and fight against the injustices of the current one. The landscape of Italy, in particular the Alps, is a pervading focus of the book, with its often lush descriptions of scenery conveying the thoughts and moods of characters.

=== Plot ===
Arthur Burton, an English Catholic, travels to Italy to study to be a priest. He discovers radical ideas, renounces Catholicism, fakes his death and leaves Italy. While away he suffers great hardship, but returns with renewed revolutionary fervour. He becomes a journalist, expounding radical ideas in brilliant satirical tracts published under the pseudonym "the gadfly". The local authorities are soon dedicated to capturing him. Gemma, his lover, and Padre Montanelli, his Priest (and also secretly his biological father), show various forms of love via their tragic relations with the focal character of Arthur: religious, romantic, and family. The story compares these emotions to those Arthur experiences as a revolutionary, particularly drawing on the relationship between religious and revolutionary feelings. This is especially explicit at the climax of the book, where sacred descriptions intertwine with reflections on the Gadfly's fate. Eventually Arthur is captured by the authorities and executed by a firing squad. Montanelli also dies, having lost his faith and his sanity.

== Background ==
According to historian Robin Bruce Lockhart, Sidney Reilly – a Russian-born adventurer and secret agent employed by the British Secret Intelligence Service – met Ethel Voynich in London in 1895. Ethel Voynich was a significant figure not only on the late Victorian literary scene but also in Russian émigré circles. Lockhart claims that Reilly and Voynich had a sexual liaison and voyaged to Italy together. During this dalliance, Reilly apparently "bared his soul to his mistress" and revealed to her the story of his strange youth in Russia. After their brief affair had concluded, Voynich published in 1897 her critically acclaimed novel, The Gadfly, the central character of which, Arthur Burton, was allegedly based on Sidney Reilly's own early life. In 2004, writer Andrew Cook suggested that Reilly may have been reporting on Voynich and her political activities to William Melville of the Metropolitan Police Special Branch. In 2016, new evidence surfaced from archived communication between Anne Fremantle, who attempted a biography of Ethel Voynich, and a relative of Ethel's on the Hinton side. The evidence demonstrates that a liaison of some sort took place between Reilly and her in Florence, 1895.

== Popularity ==
With the central theme of the book being the nature of a true revolutionary, the reflections on religion and rebellion proved to be ideologically suitable and successful. The Gadfly was exceptionally popular in the Soviet Union, the People's Republic of China, and Iran, exerting a large cultural influence. In the Soviet Union, The Gadfly was compulsory reading and the top best seller; indeed, by the time of Voynich's death, The Gadfly is estimated to have sold 2,500,000 copies in the Soviet Union alone. Voynich was unaware of the novel's popularity, and did not receive royalties, until visited by a diplomat in 1955. In China, several publishers translated the book, and one of them (China Youth Press) sold more than 2,050,000 copies. Irish writer Peadar O'Donnell recalls the novel's popularity among Republican prisoners in Mountjoy Prison during the Irish Civil War.

The Russian composer Mikhail Zhukov turned the book into an opera, The Gadfly (Овод, Ovod, 1928). In 1955, the Soviet director Aleksandr Faintsimmer adapted the novel into a film of the same title (Russian: Ovod) for which Dmitri Shostakovich wrote the score. The Gadfly Suite is an arrangement of selections from Shostakovich's score by the composer Levon Atovmian. A second opera The Gadfly was composed by Soviet composer Antonio Spadavecchia.

On the other hand, in Italy, where the plot takes place during the Italian Unification, the novel is totally neglected. It was translated into Italian as late as in 1956 and was never reprinted: Il figlio del cardinale (literally, The Son of the Cardinal). A new edition, carrying the same title, came out in 2013.

On 5 January 2026, General Secretary of the Chinese Communist Party Xi Jinping stated during a meeting with Irish Taoiseach Micheál Martin in Beijing’s Great Hall of the People that The Gadfly had sustained him during difficult years as a teenager in the Cultural Revolution. Martin noted that he had also read the novel as a late teenager, in a first-edition copy given to him by an uncle.

== Theatre adaptations ==
- 1898. The Gadfly or the Son of the Cardinal by George Bernard Shaw. This version was created at Voynich's request to forestall other dramatisations.
- 1899. The Gadfly by Edward E. Rose, commissioned by Stuart Robson. Voynich described this version as an "illiterate melodrama", and tried to get an injunction to stop it being performed.
- 1906. Zhertva svobody by L. Avrian (in Russian).
- 1916. Ovod by V. Zolotarëv (in Russian).
- 1940. Ovod by A. Zhelyabuzhsky (in Russian).
- 1947. Ovid by Yaroslav Halan (in Ukrainian).
- 1974. Zekthi by Esat Oktrova (Teledrama; in Albanian).

== Radio adaptation ==
- 1989. The Gadfly, BBC Radio 4, Saturday Night Theatre.

== Opera, ballet, musical adaptations ==
- 1923. Prazdnik krovi, melodrama in 6 acts with a prologue by S. I. Prokofiev (opera) (in Russian).
- 1928. Ovod by Mikhail Zhukov (opera) (in Russian).
- 1930. Ovod, opera in 4 acts by Alexander Ziks (in Russian).
- 1958. Ovod, opera in 4 acts and 7 scenes by Antonio Spadavecchia (in Russian).
- 1967. Ovod by A. Chernov (ballet).
- 1982. Rivares by Sulkhan Tsintsadze (ballet). Film version: Rivares, Soviet Georgian, by B. Chkheidze.
- 1983. Ovod by A. Kolker (rock musical) (in Russian).

== Film adaptations ==
- 1928. Krazana, Soviet Georgian, by Kote Mardjanishvili.
- 1955. Ovod, Soviet, by Aleksandr Faintsimmer. Shostakovich composed its film score. The Gadfly Suite, which includes the movement Romance, later becoming popular on its own right, is an arrangement of selections from Shostakovich's score by composer Levon Atovmian.
- 1980. Ovod by Nikolai Mashchenko, starring Andrey Kharitonov, Sergei Bondarchuk and Anastasiya Vertinskaya.
- 1987. Rivares. Soviet Georgian film of B. Chkheidze.
- 2003. Niumeng, Chinese, directed by Wu Tianming

== Other adaptations ==
- 1976. Bögöly (Vihar Itália felett) (The Gadfly (Storm over Italy)), a condensed comic book adaptation which concentrated on the adventurous aspects of the novel, by Tibor Cs. Horváth and Attila Fazekas; published in Hungarian, and subsequently in Polish as Szerszeń (Przygody Artura i Gemmy) (The Hornet (The Adventures of Arthur and Gemma)).
