= HMS Gadfly =

Four ships of the Royal Navy have borne the name HMS Gadfly:

- HMS Gadfly (1856) was a Cheerful-class screw gunboat launched in 1856 and broken up in 1864.
- HMS Gadfly (1879) was an Ant-class flatiron gunboat launched in 1879. She was sent to the Cape of Good Hope in April 1886 and became a coal lighter named YC 230 in 1900. She was sold in 1918.
- HMS Gadfly (1906) was a coastal destroyer launched in 1906, and renamed TB 6 later that year. She was sold in 1920.
- HMS Gadfly (1915) was a Fly-class gunboat launched in 1915 and transferred to the War Department in 1923.
