= Andrey Kharitonov =

Soviet and Russian actor (1959–2019)

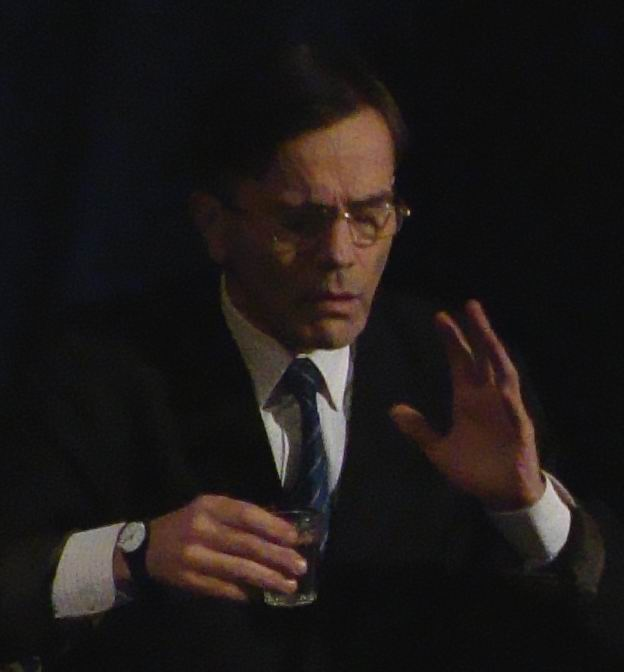
- Kharitonov at Severodvinsk Drama Theatre in 2009
- Born: Andrey Igorevich Kharitonov; 25 July 1959; Kyiv, Ukrainian SSR, Soviet Union
- Died: 23 June 2019 (aged 59); Moscow, Russia
- Occupation: Actor
- Years active: 1980–2019
- Awards: Shevchenko National Prize (1982)
- Website: andreyharitonov.ru

Andrey Igorevich Kharitonov (Russian: Андрей Игоревич Харитонов; 25 July 1959 – 23 June 2019) was a Soviet and Russian film and theater actor, director, screenwriter. He is best known for roles in films The Gadfly, The Star and Death of Joaquin Murieta and The Invisible Man.

== Personal life ==
He tried to be protective about his private life. It is known that his wife's name is Olga, they have no children.

In January 2019, it became known that Andrey had stomach cancer. On June 23, 2019 Kharitonov died.

== Filmography ==
- 1980 — The Gadfly as Arthur Burton (Felice Rivarez)
- 1981 — Yaroslav the Wise as Yasnook ('The Clear-Sighted')
- 1982 — The Star and Death of Joaquin Murieta as Joaquin Murrieta
- 1983 — Secret of the Blackbirds as Lance Fortescue
- 1984 — The Invisible Man as Jonathan Griffin
- 1987 — The Life of Klim Samgin as Igor Turoboev
- 1989 — Mystery of End House as George Challenger
- 2000 — The Romanovs: An Imperial Family as Pierre Gilliard
- 2006 — Young Wolfhound as Debtor
- 2009 — The Best Movie 2 as Gaft
- 2009 — Wedding Ring as Denis Kolesnikov
- 2010 — The Devil's Flower as episode
- 2011 — The Island of Unnecessary People as Konstantin Elizarovich Volzhansky
- 2012 — Podporuchik Romashov as Nazansky

== Recognition and awards ==
- The Gadfly:
  - Prize of the Komsomol in the CCF, Early 1980 in Kyiv (1980)
  - Golden Nymph Award for Best Actor at VANA in Monte Carlo (1981)
  - Shevchenko National Prize (1982)
- Thirst for Passion:
  - Special prize in the Cinema for The Elite In the EC Kinotavr (1991)
  - Jury Award in category Debut on CF Literature and Cinema (1995)
- Commander of the Order of the Golden Serving Art of the International Union of Charitable Organizations of the World (2007)
- The winner of the XXII International Film Forum Golden Knight (2013) for supporting actor (Podporuchik Romashov)
