= The Tavern on Pyatnitskaya =

- Directed by: Aleksandr Faintsimmer
- Written by: Nikolai Leonov
- Starring: Gennadiy Korolkov; Tamara Syomina; Konstantin Grigoriev; Lev Prygunov; Nikolai Yeremenko Jr. Aleksandr Galibin
- Cinematography: Vsevolod Simakov; Sergei Vronsky
- Music by: Andrey Eshpay
- Production company: Mosfilm
- Release date: 1978
- Running time: 90 minutes
- Country: Soviet Union
- Language: Russian

The Tavern on Pyatnitskaya (Russian: Трактир на Пятницкой, romanized: Traktir na Pyatnitskoy) is a 1978 Soviet crime film. The picture is a screen adaptation of the eponymous novel by Nikolai Leonov.

The film became was one of the leading pictures at the 1978 USSR box-office (5th place), it was seen by 54.1 million viewers.

== Plot ==
The film is set in the 1920s, the era of the NEP. The best manpower of the Moscow Criminal Investigations Department (MUR) is involved in an operation to dismantle a gang of repeat offenders led by Igor Rybin, nicknamed as "The Grey", who are based in the tavern on Pyatnitskaya. The bandits commit break-ins, robbery and murder. One of their victims becomes the old Bolshevik Alexander Falin, who helps the police.

Employee of MUR, Nikolai Panin (Victor Perevalov) goes undercover into the gang, gets hired as a waiter (introducing himself to the mistress as her lost half-brother), he is now "The Red". But then the unexpected happens - from the camp a bandit runs away who has the same name which he himself used for cover...

At the same time a romantic side-plot develops between "Pashka-America" (the famous bazaar pickpocket) and newcomer from the countryside Alyona, whom he rescued when she was in trouble.

The gang is supervised by the restaurant hostess along with her fiance The Grey. They are concerned because they notice a leak of information. The Grey requires Pashka-America to help find the police informant. The Grey's partner in crime Mikhail Lavrov, dubbed as "The Frenchman" undertakes the task, who is in possession of great intelligence and powers of deduction. A few people are under suspicion, including waiter "The Red", constant visitor of the restaurant Gramin, The Frenchman himself and Mikhail Ryumin, styled as "The Gypsy" - The Frenchman's former comrade-in-arms from the battles of the First World War and a former White officer, who did not manage to escape from Crimea during the evacuation of Wrangel's army ( "The last ship left Constantinople without me" - he says when he meets The Frenchman).

Gradually the circle of suspects narrows, either The Frenchman or The Gypsy is the guilty party. Main driver of the action becomes the detection of the undercover agent. The Grey "trusts The Gypsy with his heart and believes The Frenchman with his head" and can not decide. It turns out that an agent of the gangsters is in the police camp. Head of Criminal Investigation Klimov suspects his deputy Zaitsev, a gentleman by birth and a former employee of the tsarist police. However he does not have the evidence. As the film progresses it becomes clear that Klimov is mistaken: the true agent is not Zaitsev, but Vanya Shlyonov, former Makhnovist and longtime accomplice of the restaurant hostess, who is beyond suspicion.

Meanwhile, The Frenchman identifies The Red as the agent, but Pashka America warns him, and Panin leaves in time. The police appears at the restaurant on Pyatnitskaya. The Frenchman manages to compromise The Gypsy and assure The Grey that he is the criminal in the investigation. The Gypsy is taken hostage.

The gang tries to escape. Meanwhile, Shlyonov has a nervous breakdown and commits suicide in the building of the MUR. Shocked Klimov apologizes to Zaitsev.

The basement where the bandits have fled is surrounded by police. Gray refuses to give up and dies in a shootout together with Klimov. The rest of the bandits are arrested. It turns out that the criminal investigation agent is not Ryumin The Gypsy, but instead Lavrov The Frenchman, who is a former tsarist officer and unlike Ryumin became a Bolshevik and Red Army commander then went over to the service of the police.

At the end Pashka-America together with Alyona leaves to her village.

== Cast ==
- Gennady Korolkov as Klimov, police chief
- Tamara Syomina as Irina Kholminova, restaurant hostess
- Konstantin Grigoryev as Igor Rybin, head of the gang
- Lev Prygunov as Mikhail Lavrov, a former warrant officer
- Nikolai Yeremenko Jr. as Mikhail Eremin, a former warrant officer
- Victor Perevalov as Nikolai Panin, security officer)
- Aleksandr Galibin as Pashka-America (Pavel Antonov)

== Production ==
The film was shot in Moscow on Bolshaya Ordynka, in the courtyard of the Maloyaroslavets St. Nicholas Monastery.

== Interesting facts ==
- Leonov gave to the character of the charming pickpocket "Pashka-America" a name of a criminal who actually existed. However, the real "Pashka-America" (real name Pavel Andreev) operated in Moscow during the second half of the 1940s, doing armed robberies and murders.
- The White emigre romance ("Gentlemen" A. Dolsky) is played in the film.
- Hong Kong film Infernal Affairs (2002) and its Oscar-winning US remake The Departed (2006) have plot similarities with The Tavern on Pyanitskaya
