= The Gadfly (1980 film) =

- Ovod
- Based on: The Gadfly by Ethel Lilian Voynich
- Written by: Yuli Dunsky; Valeri Frid
- Directed by: Nikolai Mashchenko
- Starring: Andrey Kharitonov; Sergei Bondarchuk; Anastasiya Vertinskaya
- Country of origin: Soviet Union
- Original language: Russian

Production
- Producer: Eduard Rusakov
- Cinematography: Sergei Statsenko
- Editor: Aleksandra Goldabenko
- Running time: 210 minutes

Original release
- Release: 3 November – 5 November 1980

The Gadfly (Russian: «Овод», romanized: Ovod) is a 1980 Soviet drama film directed by Nikolai Mashchenko based on the 1897 novel of the same name by Ethel Lilian Voynich. Its screenplay was written by Yuli Dunsky and Valeri Frid.

== Plot ==
=== Series 1. "Memory" ===
Student Arthur Burton, the son of a wealthy English shipowner from Livorno, is fascinated by the idea of uniting Italy into one country and liberating it from the Austrian Habsburgs. Elder brother James and his wife Julia openly dislike Arthur, and the only person close to him is the rector of the seminary, Bishop Montanelli. Due to the circumstances, Arthur is briefly imprisoned, and after leaving there, he experiences a serious quarrel with Gemma. On the same day, he learns from his brother's wife that his father is in fact Montanelli. Arthur decides to go to South America, and pre-simulates his death…

=== Series 2. "Gemma" ===
Many years later, Arthur returned to Italy under the name of Felice Rivares. He is a popular pamphleteer "Gadfly", known for his intolerance of ministers of the Catholic Church. Here he meets again with Gemma, who does not recognize him, and he himself does not seek to reveal his secret to her. Despite some controversy, Gadfly and Gemma begin preparations for an armed uprising in the Papal States. During one of his business trips, Gadfly, disguised as a traveler, meets in the cathedral with his father Montanelli, who has already become a cardinal and is firmly convinced of Arthur's death. Right in the cathedral, he was arrested by the guards and sent to prison…

=== Series 3. "Father and son" ===
Friends try to arrange for him to escape from prison, which breaks down due to a sudden exacerbation of Gadfly's chronic disease. Montanelli comes to his cell for a spiritual conversation, but Arthur does not want to compromise, constantly showing his hostility to the priest. In the end, he reveals his secret to the cardinal, but refuses to accept help from his father. Gadfly is soon shot by a firing squad, and Montanelli goes mad and dies during a service in the cathedral.

== Cast ==
- Andrey Kharitonov as Arthur Burton (Felice Rivarez)
- Sergei Bondarchuk as Cardinal Montanelli
- Anastasiya Vertinskaya as Gemma
- Ada Rogovtseva as Julie Burton
- Konstantin Stepankov as Austrian Colonel
- Kamen Tzanev as Riccardo
- Stefan Dobrev as Giovanni Bolla (voiced by Vitali Doroshenko)
- Givi Tokhadze as Father Cardi
- Kartlos Maradishvili as Giuseppe (voiced by Pavel Morozenko)
- Aleksandr Zadneprovsky as James Burton
- Grigore Grigoriu as Cesare Martini (voiced by Leonid Filatov)
- Irina Skobtseva as Gladys Burton
- Vladimir Talashko as doctor
- Valeriy Sheptekita as signor Grassini
- Igor Dmitriev as episode
