= The Gadfly Suite =

Orchestral suite by Levon Atovmyan

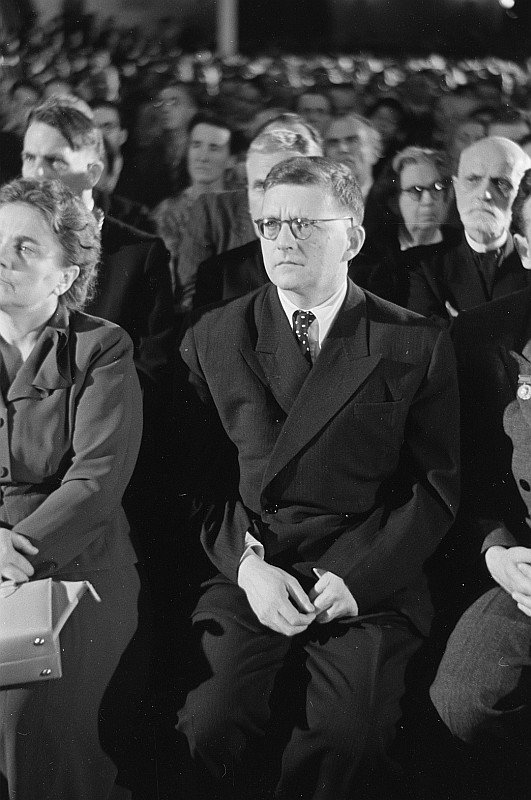
Dmitri Shostakovich in 1950

The Gadfly Suite, Op. 97a, is a suite for orchestra arranged by Levon Atovmyan from Dmitri Shostakovich's score for the 1955 Soviet film The Gadfly, based on the novel of the same name by Ethel Lilian Voynich. Atovmyan's suite differs markedly from the original: the orchestration is more colorful and economic, certain sections have been transposed harmonically, and he inserted newly composed connecting passages.

== Movements ==
The following are the movements of the Suite Op. 97a as arranged by Atovmian.

1. Overture 03:05 (C minor)
2. Contredanse 02:37 (A minor)
3. Folk Feast (National Holiday) 02:44 (A major)
4. Interlude 02:38 (B♭ minor)
5. Barrel Organ Waltz 02:01 (B♭ major)
6. Galop 02:03 (C major)
7. Introduction (Prelude) 06:18 (G♯ minor)
8. Romance 05:54 (D♭ major)
9. Intermezzo 05:49 (G minor)
10. Nocturne 04:13 (A minor)
11. Scene 03:18 (B minor)
12. Finale 03:13 (D minor)

The "Romance" section from the suite, with its solo violin melody, is known to Western TV audiences as the theme music for the Euston Films mini-series Reilly, Ace of Spies, about Russian adventurer Sidney Reilly.

The finale part of the suite can be heard on the classic music radio of the 2012 video game Sleeping Dogs. It can also be heard in the 2011 video game LittleBigPlanet 2 during the final battle.
