= The Gadfly (opera) =

The Gadfly (Russian: Овод) is a 1958 Russian-language opera by the Soviet composer of Italian descent Antonio Spadavecchia based on the novel The Gadfly. An earlier opera based on the book, also called The Gadfly, had been composed by Mikhail Zhukov in 1928.

It is set in Italy in 1834–48, one of the few Russian revolutionary operas to take a plot overseas, another being Kirill Molchanov's 1960 opera Del Corno Street following Vasco Pratolini's anti-fascist story set in Mussolini's Italy.
