= Krazana =

1928 film

- Directed by: Kote Marjanishvili
- Written by: Kote Mardjanishvili; Viktor Shklovsky; Ethel Lilian Voynich (novel)
- Cinematography: Sergei Zabozlayev
- Distributed by: Sakhkinmretsvi (Georgian SSR)
- Release date: 25 December 1928
- Running time: 95 minutes
- Country: Soviet Union
- Languages: Russian; Georgian

Krazana (Georgian: კრაზანა) is a 1928 Soviet-Georgian black-and-white silent film directed by Kote Marjanishvili. It is based on the 1897 novel The Gadfly by Ethel Lilian Voynich.

"Krazana" means wasp in Georgian language.

== Cast ==
- Nato Vachnadze as Jema
- Iliko Merabishvili as Arthur
- Aleksandre Imedashvili as Cardinal Montanelli
- Eliazar Imereli as Martin
- Victor Chankvetadze as Revolutionary
