= The Gadfly (1955 film) =

1955 film

Ovod
- Directed by: Aleksandr Faintsimmer
- Written by: Viktor Shklovsky; Ethel Lilian Voynich (novel)
- Starring: Oleg Strizhenov; Marianna Strizhenova; Nikolai Simonov; Vladimir Etush
- Cinematography: Andrei Moskvin
- Music by: Dmitri Shostakovich
- Production company: Lenfilm
- Distributed by: Artkino Pictures
- Release date: 1955
- Running time: 96 minutes
- Country: Soviet Union
- Language: Russian

The Gadfly (Russian: Овод, romanized: Ovod) is a 1955 Soviet historical action film based on the novel by Ethel Lilian Voynich and directed by Aleksandr Faintsimmer. In 1955 the film was third in attendance in the Soviet Union, collecting 39.16 million ticket sales.

The motion picture tells a story of the underground struggle of Italian patriots against the Austrian invaders for independence of their homeland. Against the background of these events is a tragic story of a man transformed from a pure heart and an enthusiastic young man to a ruthless revolutionary—the legendary and elusive Gadfly.

The film adaptation is more ideological than the Voynich novel. The romantic subplot was significantly reduced; Arthur and Gemma are shown not as lovers but as party comrades and the jealousy between Arthur and Giovanni due to Gemma is not depicted.

== Plot ==
Young student Arthur Burton says goodbye to his beloved teacher, the priest Montanelli, who is departing to Rome on the orders of the Pope. Arthur participates in activities of the organization "Young Italy". He is resentful of its leader, Giovanni Bolla; he experiences jealousy towards him regarding his girlfriend Gemma and confesses this to the priest, father Cardi. After the confession all revolutionaries end up arrested by the gendarmes. Arthur is walking through the prison courtyard and admits to Giovanni what he told in the confessional and Giovanni calls him a traitor. Arthur gets released from prison and tries to tell Gemma about what happened but she slaps him and runs away. Back home Arthur learns from his uncle Burton that his real father is Montanelli. Arthur's world falls apart before his eyes, he breaks his crucifix and runs out of his home. Everyone considers him dead.

Many years later Arthur comes home adorned with scars which he received from revolutionary battles in South America. Under the pseudonym of Gadfly he joins the revolutionaries and leads an armed struggle in Italy and terrifies the Austrian invaders. To the revolutionary intellectuals he is known under the name Felice Rivarez. The Austrian emperor sends an additional military contingent to Italy and Cardi's father welcomes marching Austrian soldiers and their commander. Gadfly is involved in a secret weapons delivery but the police agents are on his tail. The Carbonari retreat from battle but Rivarez lowers his weapon as he hears the order of Montanelli and is taken prisoner. The death sentence has been predetermined for him. Compatriots give a file to the prisoner and he saws through the bars but falls unconscious in the prison yard. Before the execution Arthur admits to Montanelli that he is his son and offers his shocked father a choice between fighting for freedom or faith in Christ. The cardinal offers his son an escape but Arthur does not want to take life or become a servant of the church. Austrians shoot Gadfly at dawn and he commands his own execution. Montanelli screams in terror that there is no God.

== Music ==
The film's score was composed by Dmitri Shostakovich, although it is better known in the suite arrangement made by the composer's friend, Levon Atovmyan.

The complete original score was reconstructed by conductor Mark Fitz-Gerald and published in 2016 as Volume 138 of the DSCH New Collected Works edition. A recording was made with Fitz-Gerald conducting the Deutsche Staatsphilharmonie Rheinland-Pfalz and published in 2017 by Naxos.

== Cast ==
- Oleg Strizhenov as Arthur Burton / Felice Rivarez
- Marianna Strizhenova as Gemma
- Nikolai Simonov as Cardinal Montanelli
- Vladimir Etush as Cesare Martini
- Antoni Khodursky as Grassini
- Vadim Medvedev as Giovanni Bolla
- Grigory Shpigel as James Burton
- Ruben Simonov as Father Cardi
- Pavel Usovnichenko as Giuseppe
- Yelena Yunger as Julia
- Vladimir Chestnokov as Domenichino
