= Aleksandr Faintsimmer =

Soviet film director (1906–1982)

- Born: Aleksandr Mikhailovich Faintsimmer; December 31, 1906; Yekaterinoslav, Russian Empire
- Died: March 21, 1982 (aged 75); USSR
- Resting place: Vvedenskoye Cemetery, Moscow
- Occupation: Film director
- Notable work: The Gadfly (1955); The Tavern on Pyatnitskaya (1978)
- Awards: Stalin Prize (1950,1951)

Aleksandr Mikhailovich Faintsimmer (Feinzimmer, Russian: Александр Михайлович Файнциммер; 31 December 1906 – 21 March 1982) was a Soviet film director. He has been cited as a filmmaker on the forefront of Russian language social thriller. His son Leonid Kvinikhidze was also a film director.

== Filmography ==
- The Czar Wants to Sleep (Poruchik Kizhe) (1934), better known as Lieutenant Kijé. Sergei Prokofiev wrote a famous instrumental piece, Lieutenant Kijé, as its main theme.
- Men of the Sea (Baltiytsy) (1938)
- Tanker "Derbent" (1941)
- Kotovsky (1942)
- Naval Battalion (1944)
- For Those Who Are at Sea (1947)
- A Girl with a Guitar (1948)
- They Have a Motherland (1949)
- Konstantin Zaslonov (1949)
- Aušra prie Nemuno (1953)
- The Gadfly (1955)
- A Girl with Guitar (1958)
- Night without Mercy (1962) (Noch bez miloserdiya) (Adaptation of a book by Kurt Sandner)
- Far in the West (1968)
- 50 to 50 (1972)
- Without the Right to Mistake (1974)
- The Tavern on Pyatnitskaya (1978)
- Farewell tour Artist (1979)
