= Antonio Spadavecchia =

Soviet composer (1907–1988)

Antonio Spadavecchia

Antonio Emmanuelovich Spadavecchia (Russian: Антонио Эммануилович Спадавеккиа; born in Odessa on 3 June 1907 – died in Moscow on 7 February 1988) was a Soviet composer of Italian descent. He was awarded National Artist of the RSFSR in 1977.

He was promoted in cultural exchanges with other socialist countries after the Second World War, and his opera, The Gadfly, was the second Russian opera after Eugene Onegin to be performed at the Hanoi Opera in the 1960s.

== Recordings ==
- Daniil Shtoda (tenor) recorded an aria from The Gadfly in a recital for Delos Records in 2005.
