= General Salmond =

General Salmond may refer to:

- Geoffrey Salmond (1878–1933), Royal Flying Corps general
- James Salmond (East India Company officer) (1766–1837), British East India Company major general
- John Salmond (1881–1968), Royal Air Force general
- William Salmond (British Army officer) (1840–1932), British Army major general

== See also ==
- Andy Salmon (born 1959), Royal Marines major general
- H. L. N. Salmon (1894–1943), Canadian Army major general
