= Roger Wilson (Indian Army officer) =

British Indian Army general (1882–1966)

Sir Roger Wilson KCB DSO MC
- Born: 26 December 1882; Richmond, Surrey, England
- Died: 5 February 1966 (aged 83); Cape Town, South Africa
- Military career
- Allegiance: United Kingdom
- Branch: British Indian Army
- Service years: 1901–1941
- Rank: General
- Conflicts: World War I World War II
- Awards: Knight Commander of the Order of the Bath; Companion of the Distinguished Service Order; Military Cross; Mentioned in dispatches (6)

General Sir Roger Cochrane Wilson KCB DSO MC (26 December 1882 – 5 February 1966) was a senior British Indian Army officer who served as Military Secretary to the India Office.

== Early life and education ==
Wilson was born in 1882, the son of Colonel Frederick Alexander Wilson, who was also an officer in the British Indian Army, and Louisa Agnes Marshall. He attended Wellington College in Berkshire and the Royal Military College, Sandhurst.

== Military career ==
Wilson was commissioned into the Cheshire Regiment in 1901. He transferred to the 117th Mahrattas in 1904 and subsequently to the 114th Mahrattas.

Wilson served in served in Mesopotamia during World War I, at the beginning of which he had been a student at the Staff College, Quetta, and was appointed a Companion of the Distinguished Service Order, the Military Cross and the Croix de Guerre for his service.

In 1926, he became Commander of the Wana Brigade, part of Northern Command, in India. Then in 1931 he was made Commandant of the Staff College at Quetta and in 1934 he became General Officer Commanding Rawalpindi District. He was appointed Military Secretary to the India Office in 1936 and Adjutant-General, India in 1937.

He was promoted to full General and became an Aide-de-Camp General to the King in 1940. He retired in 1941.

He was also Colonel of the 5th Royal Battalion of the Mahratta Light Infantry.

== Family ==
Wilson married Marian Blanche Florence Hollway, daughter of Lieutenant-Colonel James Clinton Hollway, in 1905. They had two sons and two daughters.

== Bibliography ==
- Smart, Nick (2005). Biographical Dictionary of British Generals of the Second World War. Barnesley: Pen & Sword. ISBN 1844150496.

Military offices
Preceded by Thomas Humphreys	Commandant of the Staff College, Quetta; 1931−1934	Succeeded by Guy Williams
Preceded by Sir John Coleridge	Military Secretary to the India Office; 1936−1937	Succeeded by Sir Sydney Muspratt
Preceded by Sir John Brind	Adjutant-General, India; 1937−1941	Succeeded by Brodie Haig
