= Beauchamp Duff =

Scottish military officer (1855–1918)

General Sir Beauchamp Duff GCB GCSI KCVO CIE KStJ
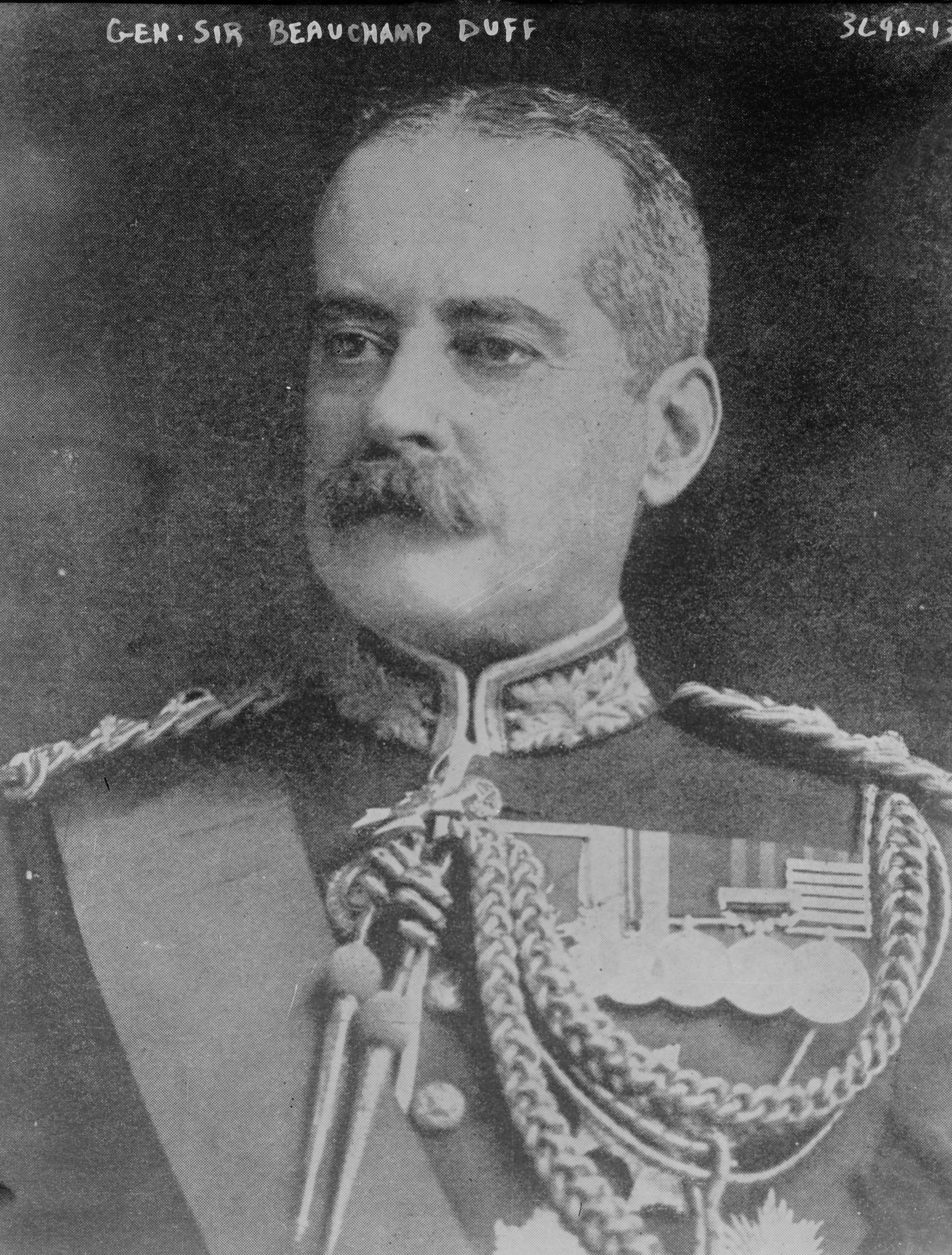
- Born: 17 February 1855; Turriff, Scotland
- Died: 20 January 1918 (aged 62); London, England
- Military career
- Allegiance: United Kingdom
- Branch: British Indian Army
- Service years: 1874–1918
- Rank: General
- Commands: Commander-in-Chief, India; Chief of the General Staff (India)
- Conflicts: Second Anglo-Afghan War; North-West Frontier; Second Boer War; First World War
- Awards: Knight Grand Cross of the Order of the Bath; Knight Grand Commander of the Order of the Star of India; Knight Commander of the Royal Victorian Order; Companion of the Order of the Indian Empire; Knight of Justice of the Order of St John; Mentioned in Despatches

General Sir Beauchamp Duff, GCB, GCSI, KCVO, CIE, KStJ (17 February 1855 – 20 January 1918) was a Scottish officer with a distinguished career in the British Indian Army. He served as Commander-in-Chief of India during the First World War. His role in the disastrous expedition to Mesopotamia was criticised, helping to end a long career.

== Early life ==
Duff was born to a landowning family in Turriff, Aberdeenshire. He was educated at Trinity College, Glenalmond, before attending the Royal Military Academy, Woolwich, from which he graduated in 1874, and thence being commissioned straight into the Royal Artillery. Two years later, Duff married Grace Maria, daughter of Oswald Wood of the Punjab Uncovenanted Civil Service. They had two sons and a daughter.

Duff served with his regiment in the Second Anglo-Afghan War from 1878 to 1880, where he was with Lord Roberts at Cabul. In 1881, he was transferred to the Indian Staff Corps and was gazetted to the 9th Bengal Infantry. The change of designated name to 9th Gurkha Rifles much later was symbolic of the shifting priorities from a land based imperial defence force, to mobile more specialized mountain units. He attended the Staff College from 1887 to 1889, from which he passed out in first place; an immediate transfer followed to the staff in India as Military Attache.

== Career in India ==
Duff was Deputy Assistant Adjutant-General at the Indian Army Headquarters from 1891 to 1895, then served as a Brigade Major on the Isazai Expedition during 1892. He was again Deputy Assistant Adjutant-General during the Waziristan Expedition from 1894 to 1895, fighting in the action at Wano, twice mentioned in despatches, he was promoted brevet lieutenant colonel.

From 1895 to 1899, Duff was Military Secretary to the Commander-in-Chief Sir George White in India, to Sir Charles Nairne and then to Sir William Lockhart, before being appointed Assistant Military Secretary for Indian Affairs in the War Office in 1899 to Lord Wolseley. In September 1899, he aided Sir George White to Natal to take part in the Second Boer War of 1899 to 1901. He was present at the sieges of Ladysmith, as well as at the actions at Elandslaagte and Rietfontein. He served as Assistant Adjutant-General on Lord Roberts Staff during the actions at Vet River and Sand River, the surrender of Johannesberg, and then the subsequent occupation of Pretoria. He was twice mentioned in despatches for the Boer War, was appointed a Companion of the Order of the Bath, and received the Queen's South Africa Medal with five clasps.

Upon returning to India, Duff, on 1 April 1901, took up the position of deputy adjutant general at the Indian Army Headquarters, and acted as adjutant general twice while the actual AG served in South Africa (April–November 1901) and was on leave in England (September–October 1902). He was appointed in command of the Allahabad District with the temporary rank of brigadier general in early 1903.

With the appointment of Lord Kitchener as Commander-in-Chief of India in November 1902, Duff quickly rose in ranks, serving first as Adjutant-General, India from 30 June 1903, when he was promoted to major general, to March 1906. He was then promoted to lieutenant general on 19 March and, while serving as Chief of the General Staff in India from 1906 to 1909, he was required to file a secret memorandum on the deployment of forces in the event of Russia invading India. He was appointed a Knight Commander of the Royal Victorian Order and, in 1907, a Knight Commander of the Order of the Bath. Following Kitchener's departure, Duff served as Secretary in the Military Department of the India Office from 1909, was promoted general on 3 June 1911, and created a Knight Grand Cross of the Order of the Bath (KCB) at the Coronation of George V and Mary later that year. In 1913 he was announced as Commander-in-Chief, India.

On 22 October 1913, Duff succeeded General Sir O'Moore Creagh as Commander-in-Chief, India. Duff's appointment was a change to normal practice as the post was usually held by a British Army officer rather one of the Indian Army. Duff was replaced by General Sir Charles Monro in June 1917, but remained Colonel of the 9th Gurkha Rifles.

== First World War ==
In 1914, Duff was appointed as ADC General to the King, and was in this significant political role when the First World War broke out on 4 August. Indian Viceroy Lord Hardinge asked Duff to make a military assessment as to the feasibility of an operation in Mesopotamia. Duff decided in short order that it was not possible. The Ottomans had 15,000 badly armed troops that would grow in numbers. A single brigade could, if careful, take Baghdad as long as it had friendly Arab support. He guessed that an occupying force would be at Baghdad for at least a fortnight before river transport could bring reinforcements. A division might garrison Baghdad, so long as the Russians held down the Turks in Armenia. His conclusion was that Baghdad was of little military value. The India Office in London was not keen either. They were sceptical of being holed up in Basra without action for an occupying force into the interior. But the Indian political department had a whip hand, were a source of information supplied, and impressive to the cabinet. But the laws of Order of Precedent applied, so any decision had to be vetted by the Imperial government in London. The Mesopotamian Campaign was under the responsibility of the Indian Army, but even after Townshend's capture of Amara he did know where were his strategic objectives. Falling very sick in 1915, he returned to India to recover. Duff entertained the general, advising that on no account could a weakened force advance any further beyond Kut, until made up to "adequate strength." General Barrow was also present at these Simla meetings. The question remained however that Townshend wanted to retreat – Aziziyeh, was untenable, and in any event his decision concurred with Duff's instructions, not to over-extend supply lines. Yet the chain of command remained confused: responsibility for reinforcements, which Townshend had refused from Nixon, would later be blamed on the Indian Commander-in-chief.

=== Mesopotamian Expeditionary Force ===
The campaign started well with the Fao Landing near Basrah in November 1914. Duff was determined that it was an Indian Army operation, advised by Sir Percy Lake, chief of staff, and GOC, Sir John Nixon there were adequate numbers of troops, 35,000 to carry out all operations. The march on Baghdad began well: 9,000 troops of the 6th Indian Division commanded by Major General Townshend in 1915 ended in catastrophe when the remnants of the British invasion force, cut down by heatstroke and disease, were defeated at Ctesiphon, and then surrounded in Kut El Amara. Duff set the final date for a possible rescue attempt before the floods, agreed by Lake to be 15 March 1916. But already the two men had fallen out; which was later reflected in the Commission of Inquiry's apportionment of culpability. Duff was reluctant to sack Lake telling Robertson that he was sure he "had his reasons," when Sir Percy finally went in July 1916. But by this time Robertson and the War Office had assumed responsibility for all military commands by-passing India.

Three attempts to relieve the trapped British and Indian troops led by General Aylmer, and then General Gorringe also ended in failure, at the cost of 23,000 lives. The surrender on 29 April 1916 was described as one of the worst military disasters in the history of the British Army. Duff could not have known how bad the prisoners were treated, as news began to filter back in September 1916. Colonel Braddon in The Siege alleged that Duff had ordered returning officers and men to remain silent on their own experiences in captivity; that they lacked food, and sufficient medical attention for the blistering sun of 130 F. He remained sanguine about these conflicting opinions. The Viceroy had asked Duff to investigate the lack of supplies and provisions. As soon as Viscount Chelmsford had replaced Lord Hardinge, he had called on the new Viceroy. Duff promised a rigorous investigation into "the actual facts". Unfortunately the answer came back that everything was going to plan. That was in December 1915, so when he embarked on another inquiry in February 1916 Duff was astutely aware of public opinion, investigating before being pushed by London. In July, the reported lack of hospital and transports ships, nominally General Nixon's command responsibility, had not yet been discharged by Duff, as the Force D Medical staff were all under India. The political pressure mounted on Duff in the Commons. However Conservative Lord President of the Privy Council, Bonar Law argued that any disclosure of Inquiry details during the war could only help the enemy and undermine morale.

Consequently, Duff was relieved of command on 1 October 1916. The Mesopotamia Commission of Enquiry was damning in its conclusions. While General Townshend was exonerated, the commission was harsh towards the Government of India and Duff himself together with the Viceroy, Lord Hardinge. Cmdr Josiah Wedgwood reflected that his condemnatory opinion pushed the general to take his own life. India had not only refused to raise new armies for war, they had given all their rifles to the Imperial army. Duff had declared Indian troops 'quite unfit for frontier work'. Kitchener had reported in 1915 "if we lose it will be worse for India than any success of internal revolution or frontier attack... held unpatriotic in a private citizen ... and in men in the positions occupied by Lord Hardinge and Sir Beauchamp Duff it has been a calamity for England." Colonial Secretary Lord Curzon called it "official blundering and incompetence" on a scale not seen since the Crimean War. When finally published 27 June 1917, it had been thoroughly discussed and agonised over by the cabinet, and on 3 July, MPs had their chance to debate. General Nixon, the Commander-in-Chief of the Mesopotamian Expeditionary Force, was also held responsible for the failed campaign "it looked as if India were trying to lay down a policy behind the back of the Secretary of State and the Cabinet." Both men were found in the dissentient [sic?] report from Cmdr Josiah Wedgwood to have shown little desire to help... some desire actually to obstruct the energetic prosecution of the war. In the end, Duff died of an accidental overdose of sleeping pills on 20 January 1918.

He left a wife, Grace, and two sons. Their middle son Evelyn Douglas (1877–97) pre-deceased him. The eldest was Beauchamp Oswald Duff (1880–1914), an army officer with 1st Gurkha Rifles, who married Mary Lander; and the youngest son, Douglas Garden Duff (1886–1968) who was a solicitor in the London firm Torr & Co.

== Bibliography ==
- Goold, Douglas (1927). Lord Hardinge and the Mesopotamia Expedition and Inquiry, 1914–1917. London.
- Latter, Edwin (1994). "The Indian Army in Mesopotamia 1914–1918". Journal of the Society for Army Historical Research. I, II, III (72).
- Mobberley, Frederick J. (1923–1927). "The Campaign of Mesopotamia 1914–1918". Official History of the Great War. 4. London.
- Nunn, Vice-admiral Wilfrid (1932). Tigris Gunboats. London.
- Tayler, Alasdair; Tayler, Henrietta (1914). The Book of the Duffs. Edinburgh: W. Brown.
- Townshend, Charles (2010). When God Made Hell: The British Invasion And The Creation of Iraq 1914–1921. Faber & Faber. ISBN 9780571237197.

Military offices
Preceded by Sir Edmond Elles	Adjutant-General, India (acting); April–November 1901	Succeeded by Horace Smith-Dorrien
Preceded by Horace Smith-Dorrien	Adjutant-General, India; 1903–1906	Succeeded by Alfred Martin
New title	Chief of the General Staff (India); 1906–1909	Succeeded by Sir Douglas Haig
Preceded by Sir O'Moore Creagh	Military Secretary to the India Office; 1909–1914	Succeeded by Sir Edmund Barrow
Preceded by Sir O'Moore Creagh	Commander-in-Chief, India; 1914–1916	Succeeded by Sir Charles Monro
