= Allen Johnson (Indian Army officer) =

General Sir Allen Johnson KCB
- Born: 2 May 1829
- Died: 7 February 1907 (aged 77)
- Military career
- Allegiance: United Kingdom
- Branch: British Indian Army
- Rank: General
- Conflicts: Second Anglo-Burmese War; Indian Mutiny
- Awards: Knight Commander of the Order of the Bath

General Sir Allen Bayard Johnson KCB (2 May 1829 – 7 February 1907) was a senior British Indian Army officer who went on to be Military Secretary to the India Office.

== Military career ==
Johnson was commissioned into the 5th Bengal Native Infantry in 1846.

He served in the Second Anglo-Burmese War in 1853 and took part in the fighting at Donabew and the capture of Pegu and went on to serve with the Jaunpur Field Force during the repression of the Indian Mutiny being present at the Capture of Lucknow in 1857.

He was appointed Military Secretary to the India Office in 1877.

He was appointed KCB in 1889 and promoted to General in 1892.

Military offices
Preceded by Sir Thomas Pears	Military Secretary to the India Office; 1877–1889	Succeeded by Sir Oliver Newmarch
