= Vaughan Cox =

British Indian Army general (1860–1923)

General Sir Vaughan Cox GCB KCMG CSI
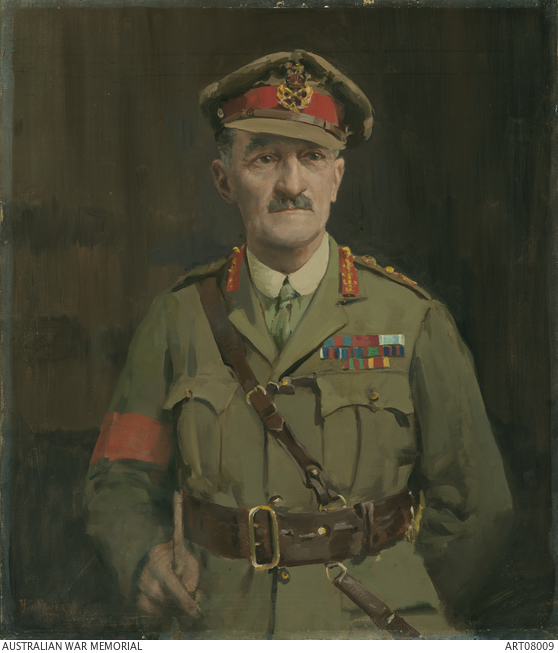
- A 1924 portrait of Cox

Military Secretary to the India Office
- In office 1917 – January 1921

General Officer Commanding, 4th Australian Division
- In office 1916–1917

Commander, 29th Indian Brigade
- In office 1914–1916

Commander, 4th Indian Brigade
- In office 1912–1914

Deputy Quartermaster-General for India
- In office 1908–1911

Commandant, 69th Punjabis
- In office 1902–1907

Personal details
- Born: Herbert Vaughan Cox; 12 July 1860 Watford, Hertfordshire, England
- Died: 8 October 1923 (aged 63)
- Awards: Knight Grand Cross of the Order of the Bath; Knight Commander of the Order of St Michael and St George; Companion of the Order of the Star of India; Mentioned in dispatches Order of the White Eagle, 2nd Class (Serbia)

Military service
- Allegiance: United Kingdom
- Branch/service: Indian Army
- Years of service: 1880–1921
- Rank: General
- Commands: 69th Punjabis; 4th Infantry Brigade; 29th Indian Brigade; 4th Australian Division
- Battles/wars: Second Anglo-Afghan War; Third Anglo-Burmese War; North-West Frontier; First Mohmand Campaign; Tirah Expeditions; Boxer Rebellion; First World War

General Sir Herbert Vaughan Cox, GCB, KCMG, CSI (12 July 1860 – 8 October 1923) was a British officer in the Indian Army.

== Early life ==
Cox was born in Watford, the son of the Rector of Upper Chelsea. He was educated at Charterhouse and the Royal Military College, Sandhurst, and was commissioned into the 25th Foot (later the King's Own Scottish Borderers) in 1880.

== Early military service ==
Posted to India, he served in the closing stages of the Second Anglo-Afghan War and was promoted lieutenant. He transferred to the Madras Staff Corps in 1882 and served in the Third Anglo-Burmese War of 1885–1886 with the 21st Madras Infantry.

Cox then briefly served as adjutant of the South India Railway Volunteer Corps before being appointed Deputy Assistant Adjutant-General for Musketry in Burma. Soon afterwards he was appointed DAAG of Imperial Service Troops. He was promoted captain in 1891. In 1894 he became an inspector of the contingents supplied by the Indian Princely States. He served on the Mohmand and Tirah Expeditions, being promoted major on 14 January 1900. Later that year he served in China during the Boxer Rebellion, for which he received the China War Medal (1900). The medal was presented to him in person by the Prince of Wales on 2 July 1902, following a parade in London of Indian troops visiting the United Kingdom for the Coronation of King Edward VII and Queen Alexandra.

== Return to India ==
Returning to India in 1902, he spent five years in command of his regiment, the 69th Punjabis, as a temporary lieutenant-colonel. He was promoted substantive lieutenant-colonel in 1904 and brevet colonel in 1907. He was promoted substantive colonel and became Assistant Quartermaster-General for Mobilisation later in 1907. Nine months later he was appointed Deputy Quartermaster-General for India, in which post he served for three years.

In 1911 he was appointed military member of the Coronation Durbar Committee with the temporary rank of brigadier-general, for which he was appointed Companion of the Order of the Star of India (CSI) later that year. In January 1912 he succeeded Brigadier-General Charles Melliss as a brigadier-general, general staff (BGGS).

== Commander at Rawalpindi ==
Cox's next post was as commander of the 4th Infantry Brigade at Rawalpindi. He was appointed Companion of the Order of the Bath (CB) in the 1912 Birthday Honours. He then took command of the 2nd (Nowshera) Infantry Brigade.

When the First World War broke out, he was promoted on 17 February 1915 to major-general and given command of the 29th Indian Brigade, which he led in Egypt, Arabia and during the Gallipoli campaign, where he was wounded. He was appointed Knight Commander of the Order of St Michael and St George (KCMG) in October 1915 for distinguished services in the field. In 1916, he was appointed Colonel of his old regiment, the 69th Punjabis.

== Service in Egypt and retirement ==
He then commanded the 4th Australian Division in Egypt and in France from 1916 to 1917, when he became Military Secretary to the India Office, where he remained until his retirement in January 1921. He was promoted lieutenant-general in January 1917 for distinguished service in the field. In 1919 he was appointed to the Esher Committee to look into Indian Army administration and organisation. He was promoted full general in 1920, and appointed Knight Grand Cross of the Order of the Bath (GCB) in the 1921 Birthday Honours following his retirement.

He died in October 1923, at the age of 63.

== Bibliography ==
- Davies, Frank; Maddocks, Graham (2014) [1995]. Bloody Red Tabs: General Officer Casualties of the Great War 1914–1918. Barnsley, South Yorkshire: Pen and Sword Books. ISBN 978-1-78346-237-7.

== Footnotes ==
Military offices
Preceded by Sir Edmund Barrow	Military Secretary to the India Office; 1917–1920	Succeeded by Sir Alexander Cobbe
