= John Coleridge (Indian Army officer) =

British Indian Army general (1878–1951)

Sir John Coleridge GCB CMG DSO
- Born: 25 April 1878; Plymouth, Devon, England
- Died: 3 November 1951 (aged 73)
- Military career
- Allegiance: United Kingdom
- Branch: British Indian Army
- Service years: 1898–1940
- Rank: General
- Commands: 189th Brigade; 188th Brigade; Peshawar District; Northern Command, India
- Conflicts: Tibet Expedition; Abor Expedition; World War I; North-West Frontier; Third Waziristan Campaign
- Awards: Knight Grand Cross of the Order of the Bath; Companion of the Order of St Michael and St George; Companion of the Distinguished Service Order

General Sir John Francis Stanhope Duke Coleridge GCB CMG DSO (25 April 1878 – 3 November 1951) was a senior British Indian Army officer who went on to be Military Secretary to the India Office.

== Military career ==
Coleridge was educated at Wellington College and the Royal Military College, Sandhurst. He was commissioned into the Indian Staff Corps in 1898, transferred to the 8th Gurkhas in July 1900 and was sent on a mission to Tibet in 1903.

Coleridge served on the Abor expedition on the north east frontier of India in 1911-12 and was mentioned in despatches. He served in World War I and in 1916 was on the General Staff of the Egyptian Expeditionary Force. He served as Commander of 189th Brigade from October 1917 when he was promoted to temporary brigadier general and then 188th Brigade from December. He was appointed a Companion of the Distinguished Service Order on 3 June 1916, appointed a Companion of the Order of St Michael and St George on 3 June 1918 and awarded a bar to his Distinguished Service Order insignia on 3 December 1918. The citation for the bar reads:

For conspicuous gallantry and fine leadership during an attack. When his battalions were held up by heavy machine-gun fire he walked round his entire line and personally gave instructions to all units for reorganisation and pushing on to their objectives. His splendid leadership enabled the brigade to take a deep objective, and was the principal factor in the success of an important operation.

After the war he was promoted to brevet colonel in January 1919 and returned to India as a General Staff Officer and carried out a review the new Indian Defence Force and the internal security measures there. He was appointed a Companion of the Order of the Bath in the 1921 Birthday Honours. He served as Assistant Commandant at the Quetta Staff College from 1923 to 1925, during which time he was made a major general, in March 1925, Military Secretary Army Headquarters, India from January 1926 to 1930 and became commander of the Kohat District in 1930.

During the North West Frontier operations of 1930-31 he commanded, as a Major-General, the Peshawar District. He was advanced to Knight Commander of the Order of the Bath in the 1933 Birthday Honours. He was Military Secretary to the India Office from 1933 to 1936 and General Officer Commanding Northern Command, India from 1936 to 1940 for which he was mentioned in despatches twice, retiring shortly afterwards. He was advanced to Knight Grand Cross of the Order of the Bath on 11 July 1940. He was also Aide de Camp General to the King from 1936 to 1940. He had been raised to the rank of a full general in June 1936.

He was appointed Colonel of the 8th Gurkha Rifles from January 1926, Colonel of the 2nd battalion 1st Punjab Regiment from November 1932 and Honorary Colonel of the 7th (Hay Tor) Battalion, Devonshire Regiment (later 87th Anti-Tank Regiment, Royal Artillery (Devons)) from 1941.

Military offices
Preceded by Sir Sydney Muspratt	Military Secretary to the India Office; 1933–1936	Succeeded by Sir Roger Wilson
Preceded by Sir Kenneth Wigram	GOC-in-C, Northern Command, India; 1936–1940	Succeeded by Sir Alan Hartley
