= Oliver Newmarch =

Major-General Sir Oliver Newmarch KCSI
- Born: 1834; Bengal, India
- Died: 16 February 1920 (aged 85); London, United Kingdom
- Burial place: Brompton Cemetery
- Alma mater: Charterhouse School; Merton College
- Spouses: Mary Isabella Parke (m. 1858; died 1867) Agnes Mary Norman (m. 1874)
- Children: two
- Military career
- Allegiance: United Kingdom
- Service: British Indian Army (East India Company) Bengal Army
- Rank: Major-General
- Awards: Knight Commander of the Order of the Star of India

Major-General Sir Oliver Richardson Newmarch KCSI (1834–1920) was a senior British Indian Army officer who served as Military Secretary to the India Office.

== Early life and education ==
Born the son of Doctor Newmarch and Violet, daughter of Colonel Sherwood, Royal Artillery, Newmarch was educated at Charterhouse School and Merton College, Oxford.

== Military career ==
Newmarch entered the Indian Army in 1855, and was later commissioned into the Bengal Staff Corps and posted to the 44th Native Infantry.

Newmarch saw service during the Indian Mutiny and received a medal for his work during it.

Newmarch served as the Military Secretary to the Government of India from 1884 to 1887. Newmarch was appointed Military Secretary to the India Office in 1889 and served in that role until 1899. While in that role, he was appointed KCSI in 1894.

== Family ==
In 1858 he married Mary Isabella Parke and they went on to have one son and one daughter. She died in 1867 and he then married Agnes Mary Norman in 1874.

Military offices
| Preceded by Sir Allen Johnson | Military Secretary to the India Office; 1889–1899 | Succeeded by Sir Edward Stedman |
