= Robert Neil Campbell =

Scottish physician (1854–1928)

Robert Neil Campbell

Sir Robert Neil Campbell KCMG CB CIE (28 September 1854 – 18 February 1928) was a Scottish physician whose career was in British India.

A son of Robert Campbell, of the British Linen Company's Bank, Edinburgh, and his wife Eliza Hamilton Forman, he was educated at the Edinburgh Institution for Languages and Mathematics and the University of Edinburgh. After graduating as a physician, he joined the Bengal Medical Service, which he rose to command. He was knighted in 1917.

Campbell retired to 29, Medina Villas, Hove, Sussex, but died at Lahore, while on a visit to India, in February 1928, aged 73.

On 3 August 1881, at Lahore, Campbell married Ethel Bensley (1860–1927). They had four sons, William Norman (1884–1907), Neil Hamilton (1885–1886), Robert Charles Cowburn (1889–1915), and George Edward Forman Campbell (1893–1915), the last two of whom were killed in action in the First World War; and two daughters, Ethell Mary (1891–1939) and Margaret Amy (1898–1980). On 2 September 1918, in Mussoorie, India, Margaret Amy married Robert McGregor MacDonald Lockhart (1893—1981), a future Commander-in-Chief of the Indian Army.

== Honours ==
- 1909: Companion of the Order of the Indian Empire
- 1912: Companion of the Order of the Bath
- 1913: Knight of Grace of the Order of St John of Jerusalem
- 1917: Knight Commander of the Order of St Michael and St George
