= Thomas Pears =

Major-General Sir Thomas Pears KCB
- Born: 9 May 1809
- Died: 17 January 1892 (aged 82)
- Burial place: Mortlake cemetery, London
- Military career
- Allegiance: United Kingdom
- Branch: British Indian Army
- Service years: 1825–1877
- Rank: Major-General
- Conflicts: First Opium War
- Awards: Knight Commander of the Order of the Bath

Major-General Sir Thomas Townsend Pears KCB (9 May 1809 – 17 January 1892) was a senior British Indian Army officer who went on to be Military Secretary to the India Office.

== Military career ==
Pears was educated at Addiscombe Military Seminary, and commissioned into the Madras Engineers in 1825.

In 1836 he was appointed commanding officer of the Madras Sappers and Miners and in that capacity went on to be chief engineer for the expedition to Karnal in India in 1839 and for the capture of Chusan in China in 1840.

In 1841 he was appointed commanding engineer of the Army in China and took a leading role in the capture of Ting-hai.

Returning to India he became consulting engineer for the railways in Madras. He became Military Secretary to the India Office in 1861 and found himself having to deal with the financial burden created by the fact that one quarter of all Indian Army officers were actually located and receiving a pension in England rather than India. He was appointed KCB in 1871 and retired in 1877.

== Family ==
In 1840 he married Bellina Marianne Johnstone and they went on to have seven children. His grandson, M.L. Pears, followed him into the army, joining the Cameronians. He served as the commanding officer for the 17th Battalion, Northumberland Fusiliers during the first half of the First World War.

Military offices
Preceded by Sir William Baker	Military Secretary to the India Office; 1861–1877	Succeeded by Sir Allen Johnson
