= Sydney Muspratt =

British Indian Army general

General Sir Sydney Muspratt KCB CSI CIE DSO
- Born: Sydney Frederick Muspratt; 11 September 1878; Battersea, Surrey, England
- Died: 28 November 1972 (aged 94); Alresford, Hampshire
- Military career
- Allegiance: United Kingdom
- Branch: British Indian Army
- Service years: 1898–1941
- Rank: General
- Commands: 4th Indian Infantry Brigade
- Conflicts: World War I World War II
- Awards: Knight Commander of the Order of the Bath; Companion of the Order of the Star of India; Companion of the Order of the Indian Empire; Companion of the Distinguished Service Order

General Sir Sydney Frederick Muspratt KCB CSI CIE DSO (11 September 1878 – 28 November 1972) was a senior British Indian Army officer who went on to be Military Secretary to the India Office.

He was born 11 September 1878 the son of Henry Muspratt, Indian Civil Service.

== Military career ==
Muspratt was commissioned into the Indian Staff Corps in 1898. He served extensively on the North West Frontier of India. He was appointed to the 12th Cavalry 1 April 1900.

He was first appointed to the staff as Staff Captain, Intelligence and General Staff Officer 3rd Class from 18 June 1906 to 17 June 1910, during which time he served on the Mohmand and Zakka Khel expeditions of 1908.

He is reappointed to the staff serving World War I from 5 September 1914 and spent the war in France & Belgium as a staff officer, ending up a General Staff Officer 1st Class from 18 January 1918 to 31 October 1920.

He did a brief stint as Deputy Director (Intelligence) in India from 1 November 1920 to 15 December 1920 before returning to regimental soldiering with the 12th Cavalry until be appointed to the staff at the War Office from 3 February 1922 to 6 October 1925.

Returning to India he was appointed a Brigade commander, 4th Indian Infantry Brigade from 17 November 1925 to 31 October 1927. Then he was made Director of Military Operations in India 1 November 1927 to 25 October 1929, during which He was promoted to lieutenant general on 9 June 1929. Subsequently he was appointed Deputy Chief of the General Staff and Director of Staff Duties at Army Headquarters, India 13 December 1929 to 6 September 1931.

He was Military Secretary to the India Office from 1931 to 1933. Then as General Officer Commanding Peshawar District from 26 November 1933 to 1 November 1936, he commanded the latter part of the Second Mohmand Campaign. He was Military Secretary to the India Office again from 1937 to 1941.

== Personal life ==
In 1925, he married Rosamonde Barry, youngest daughter of Sir Edward Barry, 2nd Baronet, and they went on to have two sons, John Scott and David Barry.

He died at 43 Broad Street, Alresford, Hampshire, aged 94.

== Bibliography ==
- Smart, Nick (2005). Biographical Dictionary of British Generals of the Second World War. Barnesley: Pen and Sword Books. ISBN 1844150496.

Military offices
Preceded by Sir Alexander Cobbe	Military Secretary to the India Office; 1931–1933	Succeeded by Sir John Coleridge
Preceded by Sir Roger Wilson	Military Secretary to the India Office; 1937–1941	Succeeded by Sir Robert Lockhart
