= Claud Jacob =

British Indian Army officer (1863–1948)

Field Marshal Sir Claud Jacob GCB GCSI KCMG
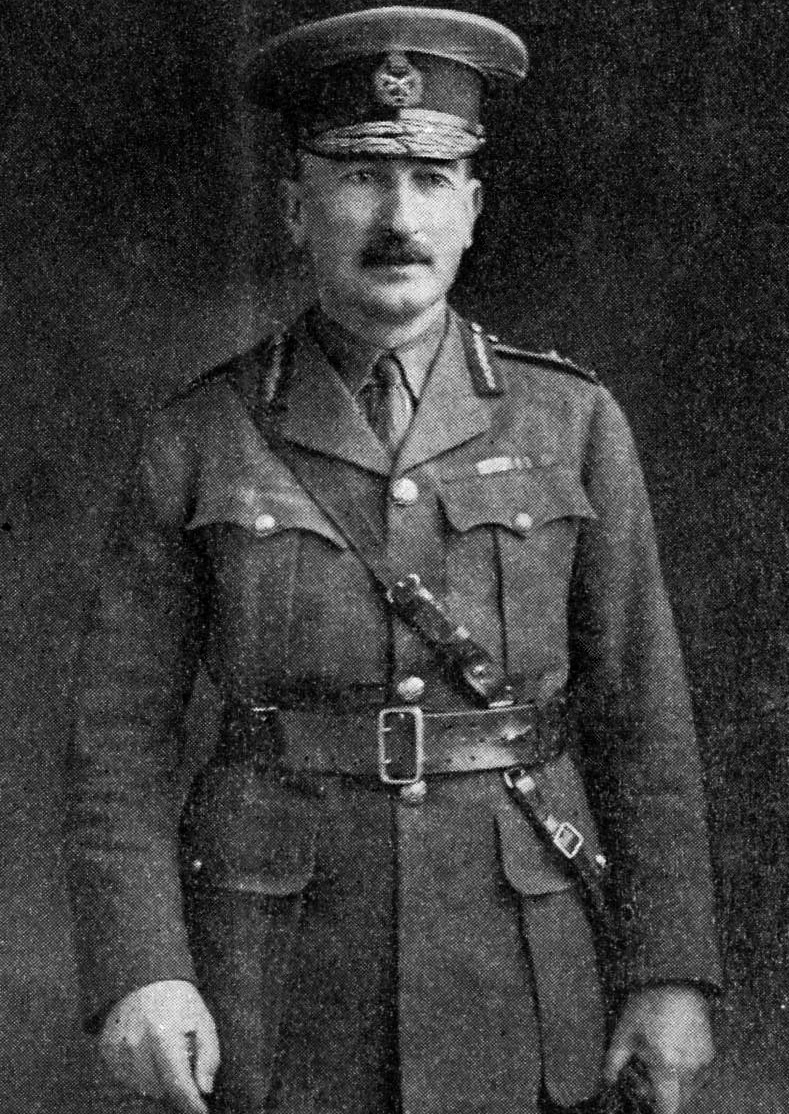
- Lieutenant-General Claud Jacob, c. 1916
- Born: 21 November 1863; Mahidpur, British India
- Died: 2 June 1948 (aged 84)
- Relatives: Major General George Le Grand Jacob (uncle); Lieutenant General Sir Ian Jacob (son)
- Military career
- Branch: Indian Army
- Service years: 1882–1925
- Rank: Field Marshal
- Commands: Commander-in-Chief, India; Northern Command, India; Chief of the General Staff (India); II Corps; 21st Division; 106th Hazara Pioneers; Zhob Levy Corps
- Conflicts: North-West Frontier; First World War
- Awards: Knight Grand Cross of the Order of the Bath; Knight Grand Commander of the Order of the Star of India; Knight Commander of the Order of St Michael and St George

Field Marshal Sir Claud William Jacob, GCB, GCSI, KCMG (21 November 1863 – 2 June 1948) was a British Indian Army officer. He served in the First World War as commander of the Dehra Dun Brigade, as general officer commanding (GOC) of the 21st Division and as GOC II Corps in the Fifth Army. After the war he commanded a corps of the British Army of the Rhine during the occupation there and then served as chief of the General Staff in India. He went on to be GOC Northern Command, India, before temporarily becoming commander-in-chief, India and then taking over as Military Secretary to the India Office.

== Early life ==
Jacob was born on 21 November 1863, at Mahidpur in the Bombay Presidency of British India, to Lieutenant William Jacob of the British Indian Army, who later became a major general, and Eliza Jacob.

== Early military career ==
Educated at Sherborne School, he passed into Sandhurst and was commissioned into the Worcestershire Regiment on 9 September 1882. On 16 December 1884, stationed at Quetta, he secured his transfer from the Worcestershire Regiment to the Indian Army and, in July 1886, he became adjutant of the 30th Regiment (Jacob's) Bombay Native Infantry also known as 3rd Belooch Regiment (now 12 Baloch).

He first saw action with the Zhob Valley expedition of 1890 after which he was posted to the 24th (Baluchistan) Regiment of Bombay Infantry (now 6 Baloch) in 1891. Promoted to captain on 9 September 1893 and to major on 10 July 1901, he was selected to command the Zhob Levy Corps, which kept the peace in the North West Frontier Province along the Waziristan and Southern Afghanistan border. He took part in the blockade of the Mahsud Waziri tribe at the end of 1901. Promoted to lieutenant colonel on 1 October 1904, he was given command of the 106th Hazara Pioneers which was "formed to help improve railway communications along the frontier". Promoted to brevet colonel on 1 October 1908 and to full colonel on 1 January 1911, he was appointed as a general staff officer, grade 1 (GSO1), of the Meerut Division on 2 September 1912.

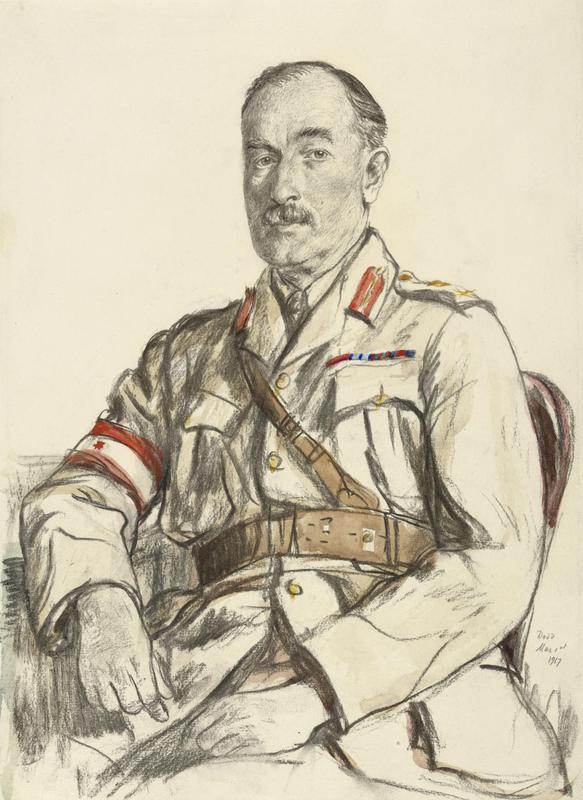
A half length portrait of General Sir Claud Jacob in uniform, 1 March 1917.

== First World War ==
Shortly after the outbreak of the First World War in the summer of 1914, Jacob went with the Meerut Division, part of the Indian Corps, to the Western Front, where he saw action at the closing stages of the Battle of La Bassée in October. Promoted to temporary brigadier-general on 5 January 1915, he was appointed to command the Dehra Dun Brigade, and led the brigade at the Battle of Neuve Chapelle in March 1915 and then in Battle of Aubers Ridge in May.

Promoted to temporary major general on 7 September 1915, he became general officer commanding (GOC) of the Meerut Division and led the division at the Battle of Loos the following month. While the Indian Corps was preparing to leave the Western front, he was appointed to take over as GOC of the 21st Division of the "New Armies" (see Kitchener's Army) on 18 November 1915, taking over from Major General George Forestier-Walker.

He was promoted to the substantive rank of major-general on 1 January 1916 "for distinguished service in the Field". He was wounded in action on 4 March 1916:

Armentières. The enemy bombardment of the town commencing at 5pm. with shells of all calibres up to 5.9'. The bullet of the L-G.O.C. was hit and the G.S.O.1, Lieut.-Colonel Daniell, killed and his G.O.C. wounded.

After returning briefly to his division in April he was promoted to temporary lieutenant general on 28 May 1916 and succeeded Lieutenant General Sir Charles Fergusson as GOC II Corps in the Fifth Army in September 1916. During the Battle of the Somme, his corps undertook the British attack during the Battle of Thiepval Ridge in September 1916 and the subsequent assault on St Pierre Divion during the Battle of the Ancre in November. He remained in command of II Corps, having been promoted to the substantive rank of lieutenant-general on 3 June 1917 "for distinguished service in the Field" for the Battle of Passchendaele in the autumn of 1917 and for the rest of the war and into 1919.

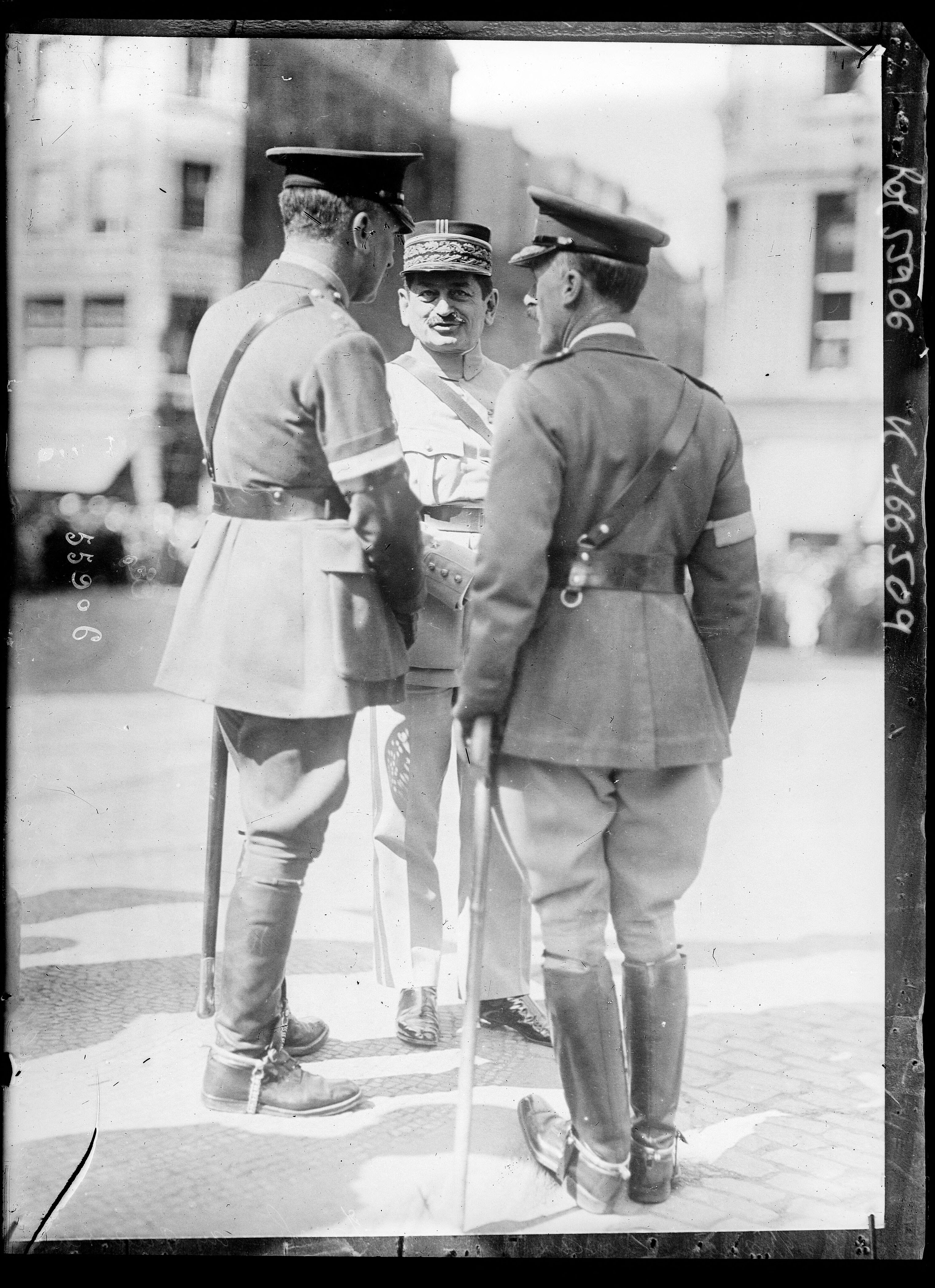
Jacob and French General Charles Mangin, Cologne, May 1919.

== Post-war ==
With the war now over, Jacob commanded a corps of the British Army of the Rhine during the occupation of the Rhineland. He became Chief of the General Staff in India in January 1920 and was then both promoted to full general and appointed aide-de-camp to King George V on 31 May 1920. He returned home to England in 1924, and in November of that year was given the Northern Command in India. When General Lord Rawlinson died in March 1925, he acted temporarily as Commander-in-Chief, India, until General Sir William Birdwood took over that role in August 1925 and Jacob returned home again. He took up the appointment of Military Secretary to the India Office in April 1926 and, having been promoted field marshal on 30 November 1926, he remained at the India Office until he retired from the army in May 1930.

In retirement Jacob became constable of the Tower of London. He was also Colonel of 2nd Battalion, The Baluch Regiment (now 7th Battalion The Baloch Regiment), colonel of the 106th Hazara Pioneers and colonel of the Worcestershire Regiment. In January 1936 he attended the funeral of King George V and in May 1937 he attended the coronation of King George VI.

He became honorary colonel of the Seaforth Highlanders in March 1940. He died at King's College Hospital in London on 2 June 1948 at the age of eighty-four.

== Family ==
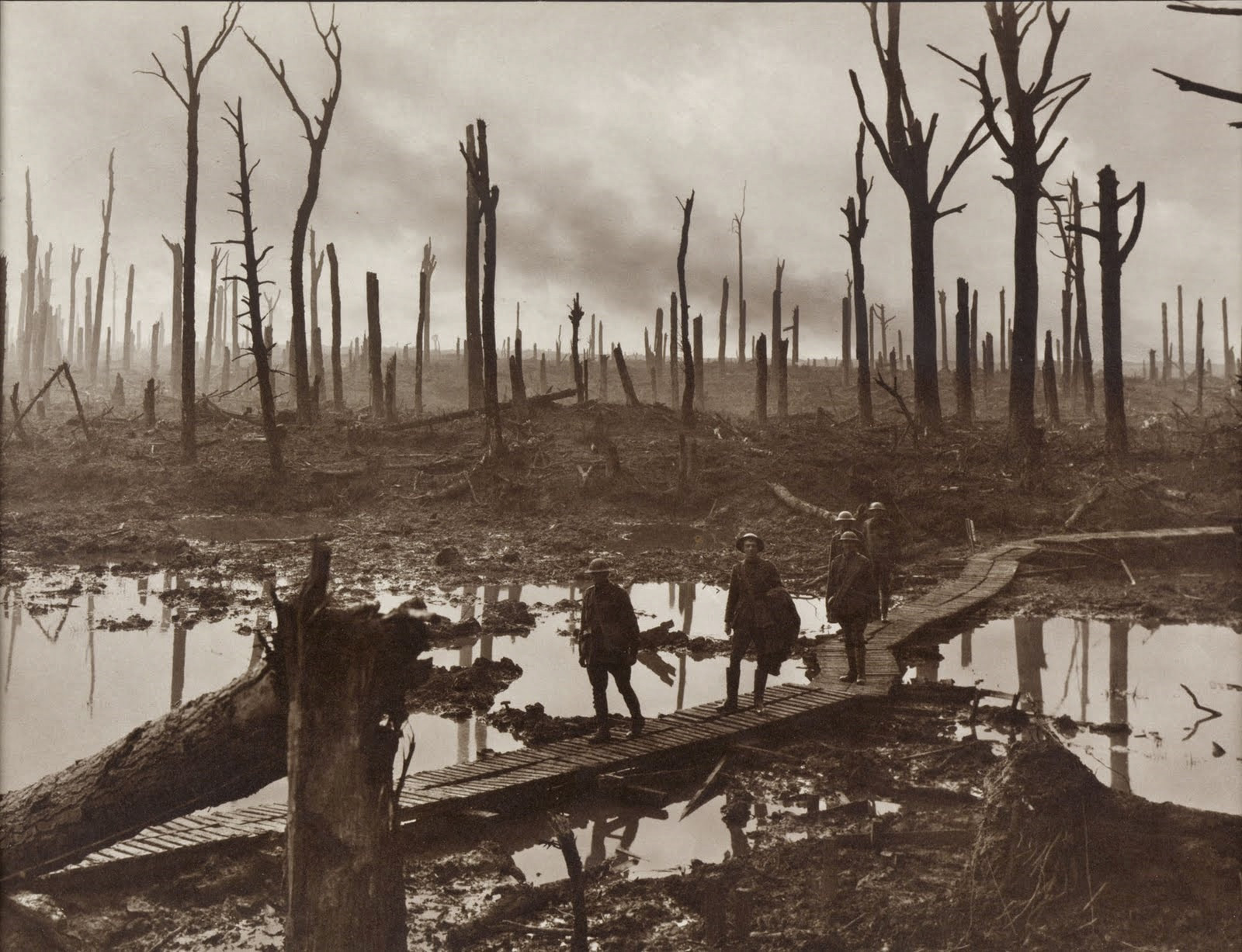
The Battle of Passchendaele, at which Jacob commanded II Corps, during the First World War

In 1894, he married Clara Pauline Wyatt, daughter of the Reverend J. L. Wyatt, well known as a missionary and student of oriental languages in India, and also a lecturer in Tamil at Cambridge University from 1895 to 1929. The couple had one son, Edward Ian Claud Jacob, who later became Assistant Military Secretary of the War Cabinet and Director-General of the BBC.

== Honours ==
British

- KCMG – 1 January 1919
- GCSI – 3 June 1930 (KCSI – 1 January 1924)
- GCB – 1926 Birthday Honours (KCB – 1917; CB – 1915)
- Knight of Grace of the Venerable Order of Saint John – 19 June 1926

Foreign

- Order of Saint Vladimir, 4th Class, with Swords (Russia) - 25 August 1915
- Grand Officer of the Order of the Crown (Belgium) – 11 March 1918
- Grand Officer of the Legion of Honour (France) – 15 December 1919
- Croix de Guerre (France) – 7 January 1919
- Distinguished Service Medal (United States) – 12 July 1919

== Bibliography ==
- Davies, Frank (1997). Bloody Red Tabs: General Officer Casualties of the Great War 1914–1918. London: Pen & Sword Books. ISBN 978-0-85052-463-5.
- Heathcote, Tony (1999). The British Field Marshals 1736–1997. Barnsley (UK): Pen & Sword. ISBN 0-85052-696-5.
- Miall, Leonard (1994). Inside the BBC: British Broadcasting Characters. Weidenfeld and Nicolson. ISBN 0-297-81328-5.

Military offices
Preceded by George Forestier-Walker	GOC 21st Division; 1915–1916	Succeeded by David Campbell
Preceded by Charles Fergusson	GOC II Corps; 1916–1919	Succeeded by Sir Alexander Godley
Preceded by Sir George Kirkpatrick	Chief of the General Staff (India); 1920–1924	Succeeded by Sir Andrew Skeen
Preceded by Sir William Birdwood	GOC-in-C, Northern Command, India; 1924–1925	Succeeded by Sir Alexander Cobbe
Preceded by Sir Henry Rawlinson	Commander-in-Chief, India; 1925	Succeeded by Sir William Birdwood
Preceded by Sir Alexander Cobbe	Military Secretary to the India Office; 1926–1930	Succeeded by Sir Alexander Cobbe
Honorary titles
Preceded by Baron Milne	Constable of the Tower of London; 1943–1948	Succeeded by Baron Chetwode
