= Edward Stedman =

General Sir Edward Stedman GCB KCIE
- Born: 27 July 1842; Bloomsbury, Middlesex
- Died: 25 June 1914 (aged 71); Arundel, Sussex
- Military career
- Allegiance: United Kingdom
- Branch: British Indian Army
- Service years: 1860–1907
- Rank: General
- Commands: 3 Gorkha Rifles
- Conflicts: Third Anglo-Burmese War; Chitral Expedition
- Awards: Knight Grand Cross of the Order of the Bath; Knight Commander of the Order of the Indian Empire; Mentioned in Despatches

General Sir Edward Stedman, GCB, KCIE (27 July 1842 – 25 June 1914) was a senior British Indian Army officer who served as Military Secretary to the India Office from 1899 to 1907.

== Military career ==
Stedman was commissioned into the Bengal Staff Corps in 1860. By 1885 he was appointed commanding officer of the 3 Gorkha Rifles and was strongly commended for his leadership in Upper Burma by Major General Sir George Stuart White, Commanding the Upper Burma Field Force. Later that year Stedman was made inspector-general of police in Upper Burma.

Stedman joined the Chitral Expedition in 1895 as second-in-command and general of communications. He was appointed Military Secretary to the India Office in 1899.

Stedman was appointed a Knight Commander of the Order of the Bath in the 1902 Coronation Honours list published on 26 June 1902, and invested as such by King Edward VII at Buckingham Palace on 24 October. He was promoted to a Knight Grand Cross of the Order of the Bath on 19 June 1911.

Stedman was also colonel of the 23rd Sikh Pioneers.

Military offices
Preceded by Sir Oliver Newmarch	Military Secretary to the India Office; 1899–1907	Succeeded by Sir O'Moore Creagh
