= Rob Lockhart =

British Army general (1893–1981)

General Sir Robert Lockhart KCB CIE MC
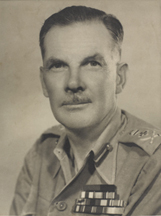

1st Commander-in-Chief, Indian Army
- In office 15 August 1947 – 31 December 1947
- Monarch: George VI
- Governor General: Lord Mountbatten
- Prime Minister: Jawaharlal Nehru
- Preceded by: Office Established
- Succeeded by: F. R. Roy Bucher

Personal details
- Born: 23 June 1893 Beith, North Ayrshire, Scotland
- Died: 11 September 1981 (aged 88) Kent, England
- Awards: Knight Commander of the Order of the Bath; Companion of the Order of the Indian Empire; Military Cross

Military service
- Allegiance: United Kingdom; British India; India
- Branch/service: British Army; British Indian Army; Indian Army
- Years of service: 1913–1948; 1951–1952
- Rank: General
- Commands: Southern Command; 1st Battalion, 12th Frontier Force Regiment; Indian Army
- Battles/wars: First World War; Second World War

General Sir Robert McGregor MacDonald Lockhart KCB CIE MC (23 June 1893 – 11 September 1981) was a senior British Army officer during the Second World War and later the first Commander-in-Chief of the Indian Army upon India's independence.

In retirement he was a leading member of the Scout Association.

== Family ==
Lockhart was born in Ayrshire, Scotland. His mother was Florence Stuart Macgregor, while other ancestors included Bruces, Hamiltons, Cummings, Wallaces and Douglases. His brother, the diplomat and writer R. H. Bruce Lockhart, claimed that "There is no drop of English blood in my veins." Another brother, J. H. Bruce Lockhart, was headmaster of Sedbergh School, while his nephews Rab Bruce Lockhart and Logie Bruce Lockhart went on to become headmasters of Loretto and Gresham's. Another nephew, J. M. Bruce Lockhart, was an intelligence officer.

== Military career ==
Lockhart was born 23 June 1893 and educated at the Royal Military College, Sandhurst, and was commissioned onto the Unattached List for the Indian Army as a second lieutenant on 22 January 1913. He joined the 51st Sikhs on 8 March 1914 and in the First World War served in Egypt, Aden, and Mesopotamia. He was promoted to lieutenant on 22 April 1915, to acting captain on 13 April 1916, again on 7 October 1916, and to captain on 22 January 1917. On 1 January 1918 he was awarded the Military Cross.

Attending the Staff College, Camberley from 1926 to 1927, he was promoted to major 22 January 1931, Lockhart was brevetted as a lieutenant-colonel on 1 January 1933 and appointed as military attache to the Kingdom of Afghanistan from 10 March 1934 to 1 December 1935. He was Promoted to lieutenant-colonel on 8 November 1936, and was given command of the 1st battalion, the 12th Frontier Force Regiment. He was promoted to colonel on 1 February 1939 (with seniority from 1 January 1936), and appointed Deputy Director of Staff Duties in the India Office. from 1 February 1939 to 19 December 1939.

Promoted to temporary brigadier on 20 December 1939, Lockhart served in the Second World War as Director of Staff Duties in the India Office from 20 December 1939 to 14 December 1941, when he became Military Secretary to the India Office, a position he filled until 9 July 1943. He was promoted to acting major-general on 28 April 1941, to temporary major-general on 28 April 1942, and to the permanent rank of major-general on 24 October 1942. Promoted to acting lieutenant-general on 15 April 1945, he was appointed General Officer Commanding Southern Command in India that year, and was promoted to lieutenant-general on 23 November (with seniority from 3 April 1944). On 19 June 1947, with the independence of India and Pakistan imminent, he was appointed acting Governor of the North West Frontier Province.

On 15 August 1947, the day British India was partitioned into two independent Dominions, Lockhart was appointed Commander-in-Chief, Indian Army, with the acting rank of general. He was promoted to general on 1 September (with seniority from 1 July 1945). He retired on 1 October 1948, but was recalled to the British forces as Director of Operations during the Malaya Emergency between 1951 and 1952.

Retiring in 1951, he served as deputy chief scout for the Boy Scouts Association from 1951 to 1961. He also served on the World Scout Committee of the World Organization of the Scout Movement from 1953 to 1959, and in 1961 was awarded the Bronze Wolf Award, the only distinction of the World Organization of the Scout Movement, awarded by the World Scout Committee for exceptional services to world Scouting.

== Personal life ==
On 2 September 1918, in Mussoorie, a hill station in India, Lockhart married Margaret Amy Campbell, a daughter of Sir Robert Neil Campbell, commander of the Bengal Medical Service. Their daughter Mary Mavora Lockhart was born in 1919, and a son, Norman Neil Campbell Lockhart, born in 1925. Their son was named after Rob Lockhart's favourite brother, Norman Douglas Steward Bruce Lockhart, who was killed at the Battle of Loos in 1915; he went on to be commissioned into his uncle's regiment, the Seaforth Highlanders, and served in the Malaya Emergency. They had two further daughters, Elizabeth Winifred, who married Major E. P. Woods, Welsh Guards, and Phyllis Margaret, who married Lt. Cmdr. James Mcnie Whyte R.N.

Lockhart died on 11 September 1981, leaving property valued at £4504. His address at death was Gainsborough Nursing Home, Tunbridge Wells, Kent.

== Bibliography ==
- Smart, Nick (2005). Biographical Dictionary of British Generals of the Second World War. Barnesley: Pen & Sword. ISBN 1844150496.

Military offices
Preceded by Sir Sydney Muspratt	Military Secretary to the India Office; 1941–1943	Succeeded by George Molesworth
Preceded by Sir Noel Beresford-Peirse	GOC-in-C, Southern Command, India; 1945 – 1947	Succeeded by Post disbanded
Preceded by New position. Replaced the Chief of the General Staff (India)	Commander-in-Chief, Indian Army; 1947	Succeeded by Sir Roy Bucher
Political offices
Preceded by Sir Olaf Kirkpatrick Caroe	Governor of the North-West Frontier Province; 1947	Succeeded by Sir George Cunningham
