= Edmund Barrow =

British Army general (1852–1934)

General Sir Edmund Barrow GCB KCMG
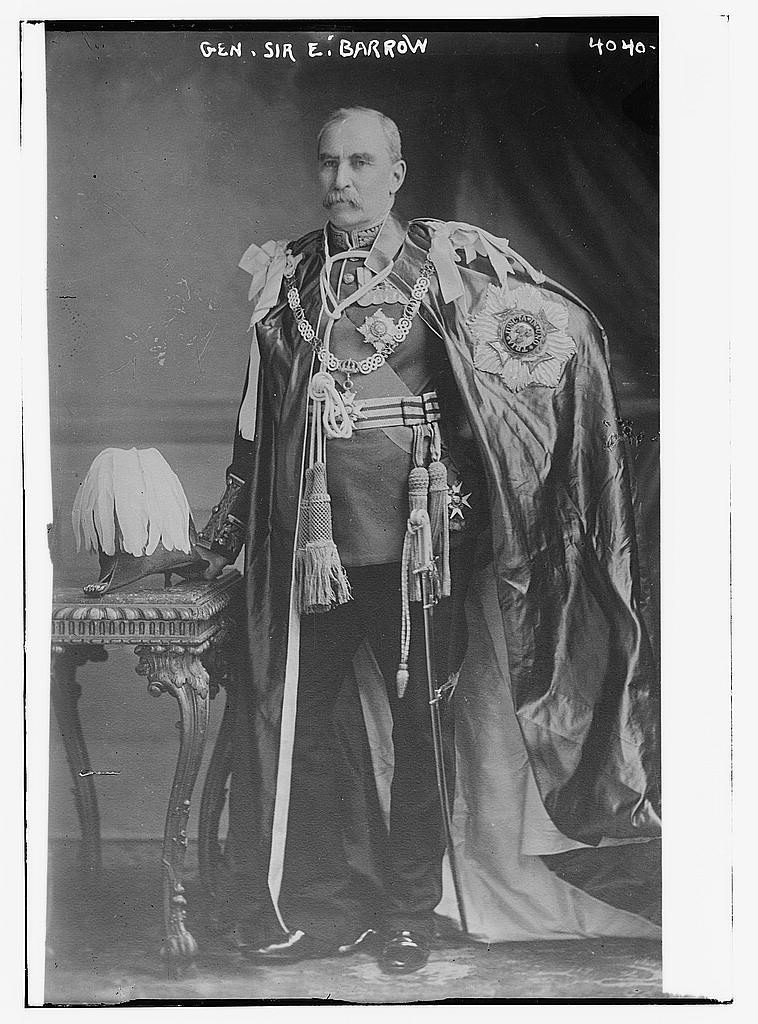
- Barrow in 1916
- Born: 28 January 1852; British India
- Died: 3 January 1934 (aged 81); Milestown, Castlebellingham, County Louth, Ireland
- Military career
- Allegiance: United Kingdom
- Branch: Indian Army
- Service years: 1871–1919
- Rank: General
- Commands: Southern Army, India; 1st (Peshawar) Division; Hong Kong Regiment
- Conflicts: Second Anglo-Afghan War; Anglo-Egyptian War; Boxer Rebellion; First World War
- Awards: Knight Grand Cross of the Order of the Bath; Knight Commander of the Order of St Michael and St George

General Sir Edmund George Barrow, GCB, KCMG (28 January 1852 – 3 January 1934) was a senior British Indian Army officer who served as Military Secretary to the India Office from 1914 to 1917.

== Early life and education ==
Barrow was born in British India to Major General Joseph Lyons Barrow of the Madras Army, and his wife, Alicia. He was educated at Marlborough College and Royal Military College, Sandhurst.

== Military career ==
Barrow was commissioned into the 102nd Regiment of Foot in 1871, at age 19. Having joined the Indian Army in 1877, he served in the Second Anglo-Afghan War of 1878 and the Anglo-Egyptian War of 1882. He was a member of the Lockhart Boundary Commission to Chitral, Kafirstan, Hunza and Wakhan in 1885 and the Anglo-Siamese Boundary Commission in 1889. He was made commanding officer of the Hong Kong Regiment in 1892, and took part in the Tirah Expedition to the North West Frontier of India in 1897. He was appointed deputy adjutant-general, Bengal Command, on 1 April 1900, but only three months later, in July 1900 was transferred as chief of staff for the China Expeditionary Force in response to the Boxer Rebellion, after which he was knighted as a Knight Commander of the Order of the Bath. He was appointed secretary to the Military Department of the Government of India in November 1901, with the temporary rank of major general whilst so employed, and general officer commanding 1st (Peshawar) Division in India in 1904. He was appointed general officer commanding the Southern Army in India in 1908. On 30 June 1908 he was appointed a lieutenant general on the staff in India.

Barrow served in the First World War as Military Secretary to the India Office from 1914. He was appointed a member of the Council of India in 1917 and retired in 1919.

Military offices
Preceded by Sir Archibald Hunter	GOC-in-C, Southern Army, India; 1908–1912	Succeeded by Sir John Nixon
Preceded by Sir Beauchamp Duff	Military Secretary to the India Office; 1914–1917	Succeeded by Sir Herbert Cox
