= O'Moore Creagh =

Recipient of the Victoria Cross

General Sir O'Moore Creagh VC GCB GCSI
- Born: Garrett O'Moore Creagh; 2 April 1848; Cahirbane, County Clare, Ireland
- Died: 9 August 1923 (aged 75); South Kensington, London, England
- Burial place: East Sheen Cemetery
- Relatives: Major General Sir Michael Creagh (son)
- Military career
- Allegiance: United Kingdom
- Branch: British Army; British Indian Army
- Service years: 1866–1914
- Rank: General
- Unit: 95th (Derbyshire) Regiment of Foot
- Commands: Commander-in-Chief, India; 29th (DCO) Bombay Infantry (2nd Baluch Battalion)
- Conflicts: Second Anglo-Afghan War; Boxer Rebellion
- Awards: Victoria Cross; Knight Grand Cross of the Order of the Bath; Knight Grand Cross of the Order of the Star of India; Venerable Order of Saint John; Order of the Rising Sun (Japan)

General Sir Garrett O'Moore Creagh (2 April 1848 – 9 August 1923), known as Sir O'Moore Creagh, (Note: Despite appearances to the contrary, O'Moore was his middle name, not part of his surname.) was a senior British Army officer and an Irish recipient of the Victoria Cross, the highest award for gallantry in the face of the enemy that can be awarded to British and Commonwealth forces.

== Early life and family ==
Creagh was born in Cahirbane, County Clare, on 2 April 1848, the seventh son of Captain James Creagh, an officer of the Royal Navy, and his wife, Grace O'Moore.

Creagh was married twice, firstly to Mary Longfield (or possibly Brereton) in 1874, who died in 1876, and then to Elizabeth Reade in 1891. He had three children, one of whom was Major General Sir Michael Creagh.

In 1866, after training at the Royal Military College, Sandhurst, Creagh was commissioned into the 95th (Derbyshire) Regiment of Foot and in 1869 was posted to India, being transferred to the British Indian Army the next year.

== Second Anglo-Afghan War ==
Creagh was 31 years old, and a captain in the Bombay Staff Corps during the Second Anglo-Afghan War, when the following deed on 22 April 1879 at Kam Dakka, on the Kabul River, Afghanistan, took place for which he was awarded the VC:

On the 21st April Captain Creagh was detached from Dakka with two Companies of his Battalion to protect the village of Kam Dakka on the Cabul River, against a threatened incursion of the Mohmunds, and reached that place the same night. On the following morning the detachment, 150 men, was attacked by the Mohmunds in overwhelming numbers, about 1,500; and the inhabitants of Kam Dakka having themselves taken part with the enemy, Captain Creagh found himself under the necessity of retiring from the village. He took up a position in a cemetery not far off, which he made as defensible as circumstances would admit of, and this position he held against all the efforts of the enemy, repeatedly repulsing them with the bayonet until three o'clock in the afternoon, when he was relieved by a detachment sent for the purpose from Dakka. The enemy were then finally repulsed, and being charged by a troop of the 10th Bengal Lancers, under the command of Captain D. M. Strong, were routed and broken, and great numbers of them driven into the river. The Commander-in-Chief in India has expressed his opinion that but for the coolness, determination, and gallantry of the highest order, and the admirable conduct which Captain Creagh displayed on this occasion the detachment under his command would, in all probability, have been cut off and destroyed.

== Later career ==
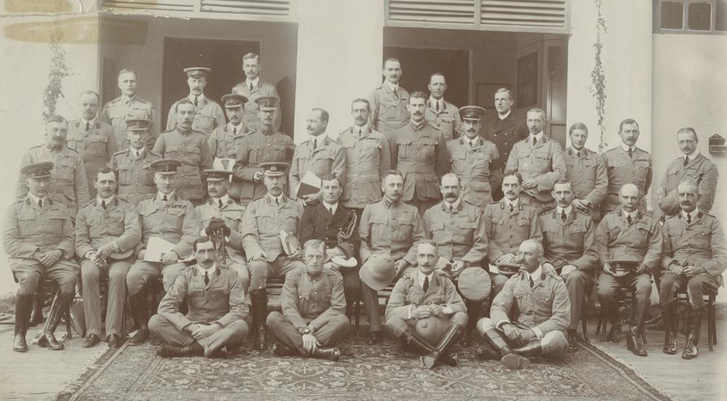
General Sir O'Moore Creagh, the C-in-C, India, and members of his staff, c. 1910. Major General Douglas Haig, later a field marshal, is sat in the second row, seventh from the left.

In 1878, he became captain of the Merwara battalion, commanding them from 1882 until 1886. He assumed command of the 29th (Duke of Connaught's Own) Bombay Infantry (2nd Baluch Battalion) in 1890, and was promoted to Assistant Quarter-master General in Bombay on 7 March 1896. He commanded the Indian contingent during the Boxer Rebellion in China in 1900, and was in July 1901 appointed General Officer Commanding the British Force in China after the departure of General Alfred Gaselee. He stayed in China for several years, and a report on the field operations of the force during his first year in overall command was sent in a despatch published in the London Gazette of 21 November 1902. He was knighted as a Knight Commander of the Order of the Bath (KCB) in 1904 and promoted to general on 11 December 1907. The same year he was appointed Military Secretary to the India Office.

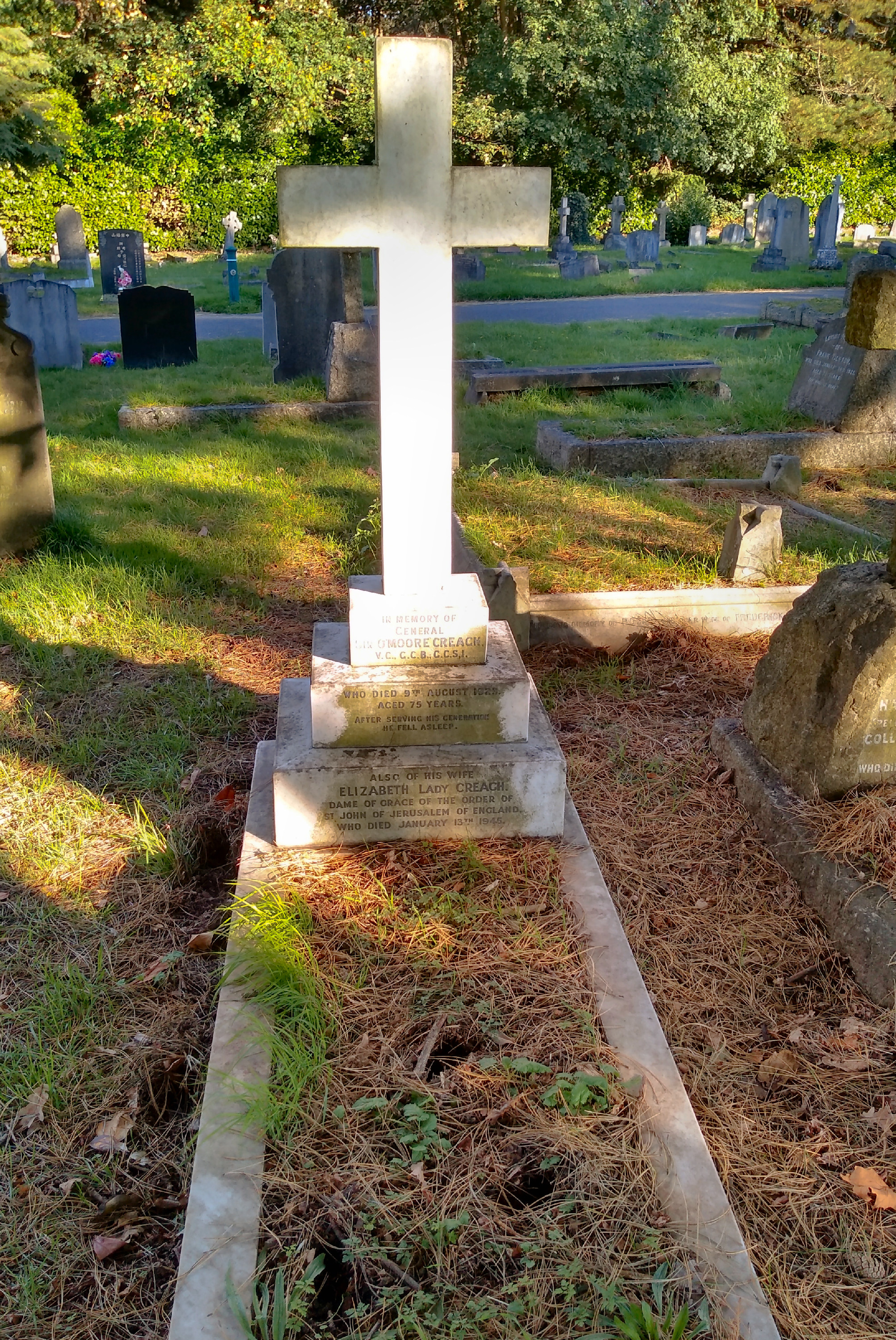
Grave in East Sheen Cemetery

Creagh succeeded Lord Kitchener as Commander-in-Chief, India, in 1909, retiring in 1914. During the First World War, he served as the military advisor to the Central Association of Volunteer Training Corps. He died at 65 Albert Hall Mansions, London SW9, on 9 August 1923.

Creagh further followed Kitchener in becoming the District Grand Master of Freemasons in the Punjab.

His Victoria Cross is held by the National Army Museum in Chelsea, London, England.

== Notes ==
Military offices
Preceded by Sir Edward Stedman	Military Secretary to the India Office; 1907–1909	Succeeded by Sir Beauchamp Duff
Preceded by The Viscount Kitchener of Khartoum	Commander-in-Chief, India; 1909–1914	Succeeded by Sir Beauchamp Duff
