= William Erskine Baker =

British Indian Army officer (1808–1881)

General Sir William Erskine Baker KCB
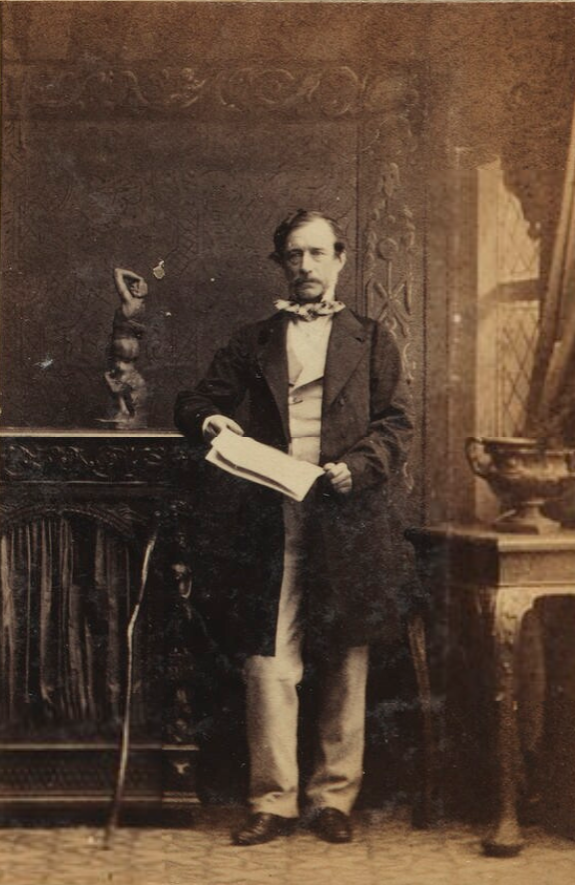
- Baker in 1862
- Born: 29 November 1808; Leith, Scotland
- Died: 16 December 1881 (aged 73); Banwell Castle, Somerset
- Military career
- Allegiance: United Kingdom
- Branch: British Indian Army
- Rank: General
- Conflicts: First Anglo-Sikh War
- Awards: Knight Commander of the Order of the Bath

General Sir William Erskine Baker KCB (29 November 1808 – 16 December 1881) was a senior British Indian Army officer, who became Military Secretary to the India Office.

== Early life ==
William Erskine Baker was born in Leith, near Edinburgh, Scotland, on 29 November 1808 and was the fourth son of Elizabeth and Captain Joseph Baker R.N. His father died in 1817, and in 1821 he, his mother and eight siblings went to live with his mother’s uncle, Admiral James Vashon, in Ludlow, Shropshire. He was educated at King Edward VI’s Grammar School in Ludlow where he received a good classical education.

In 1825 he entered the East India Military Seminary at Addiscombe, near Croydon, where his mathematical studies continued under the guidance of Jonathan Cape, a tutor at the seminary who was also a Fellow of Trinity College, Cambridge. Baker was born with a speech impediment, and left Addiscombe for six months to receive specialist treatment in Edinburgh. He returned to Addiscombe in January 1826, caught up with his studies, and passed his exams in December 1826. This was recognised as an exceptionally short time in which to complete his course. He left the seminary at the end of 1826, and went on to undertake field instruction at Chatham Dockyard; but left after a short time owing to ill health.

== Career ==
In 1828 Baker went to India as a lieutenant in the Bengal Engineers. He was posted to the Irrigation Department of the North-West Provinces under the command of Colonel Colvin, a post sought after by many officers. Here he worked with engineers Charles Napier and Henry Durand on the Jumna Canals. When Colvin returned home to England in 1836, Lieutenant Baker succeeded him and was put in charge of the Jumna Canals, a position he held until 1843.

In 1843, following the annexation of the Sindh to British India, Baker was appointed Superintendent of Canals and Forests in Sindh. He served in the First Anglo-Sikh War and fought at the Battle of Sobraon in 1846. He transferred to the Public Works Department, and was latterly consulting engineer on railways, and an authority on irrigation to the Government of India. He became Military Secretary to the India Office in 1859 and became a member of the Council of India in 1861. He was appointed KCB in 1870 and retired in 1875. He died at his home at Banwell Castle in Somerset in 1881.

== Siwalik Fossils ==
Baker first became acquainted with the fossils from the Siwalik Hills in India, after he received a fossil of an elephant's tooth from the Rajah of Nahan in November 1834.

== Personal life ==
In 1837 Baker married Frances Gertrude Duncan, third daughter of Major-General Alexander Duncan, on 29 June 1837. They were married for 44 years, but had no children. On 27 February the following year Baker’s sister Josephine married Colonel John Colvin in Ludlow, Shropshire.

Military offices
Preceded by Philip Melvill	Military Secretary to the India Office; 1859–1861	Succeeded by Sir Thomas Pears
