= Military Secretary to the India Office =

The Military Secretary to the India Office was a senior government official within the India Office and its predecessor the India Board, who was responsible for the recruitment of British and other European nationals to the officer ranks of the British Indian Army.

== Military Secretaries to the India Office ==
The Military Secretaries were as follows:

=== India Board ===
- Major James Salmond 1809–1837
- Philip Melvill 1837–1858

=== India Office ===
- Colonel William Baker, 1859–1861
- Major-General Sir Thomas Pears, 1861–1877
- Colonel Allen Johnson, 1877–1889
- Major-General Sir Oliver Newmarch, 1889–1899
- Major-General Sir Edward Stedman, 1899–1907
- Lieutenant-General Sir O'Moore Creagh, 1907–1909
- Lieutenant-General Sir Beauchamp Duff, 1909–1914
- General Sir Edmund Barrow, 1914–1917
- Lieutenant-General Sir Herbert Cox, 1917–1920
- Lieutenant-General Sir Alexander Cobbe, 1920–1926
- Field Marshal Sir Claud Jacob, 1926–1930
- General Sir Alexander Cobbe, 1930–1931
- Major-General Sydney Muspratt, 1931–1933
- Lieutenant-General Sir John Coleridge, 1933–1936
- Major-General Sir Roger Wilson, 1936–1937
- Lieutenant-General Sir Sydney Muspratt, 1937–1941
- Major-General Rob Lockhart, 1941–1943
- Lieutenant-General George Molesworth, 1943–1944
- General Sir Mosley Mayne, 1945–1947
- Lieutenant-General Sir Geoffry Scoones, 1947
