= Alexander Cobbe =

Recipient of the Victoria Cross

General Sir Alexander Cobbe VC GCB KCSI DSO
- Cobbe in 1902, the Graphic
- Born: 6 June 1870; Nainital, Bengal Presidency, British India
- Died: 29 June 1931 (aged 61)
- Burial place: Sharnbrook, Bedfordshire
- Military career
- Allegiance: United Kingdom
- Branch: British Army (1889–94); British Indian Army (1894–31)
- Service years: 1889–1931
- Rank: General
- Commands: Northern Command, India; III Indian Corps; 1st (Central Africa) Battalion, King's African Rifles; Central Africa Regiment
- Conflicts: Chitral Expedition; War of the Golden Stool; Somaliland campaign First World War
- Awards: Victoria Cross; Knight Grand Cross of the Order of the Bath; Knight Commander of the Order of the Star of India; Distinguished Service Order; Mentioned in dispatches (17); Commander of the Legion of Honour (France); Commander of the Order of Saints Maurice and Lazarus (Italy)

General Sir Alexander Stanhope Cobbe VC GCB KCSI DSO (6 June 1870 – 29 June 1931) was a senior British Indian Army officer and a recipient of the Victoria Cross, the highest award for gallantry in the face of the enemy that can be awarded to British and Commonwealth forces.

== Early life ==
Alexander Stanhope Cobbe was born on 5 June 1870 in Nainital, Bengal Presidency, British India, the third child and second son of Lieutenant General Sir Alexander Hugh Cobbe and Emily Barbara Cobbe, née Jones. Alexander had two sisters and four brothers; of the latter two became lieutenant colonels in the British Army and one a captain in the Royal Navy. In 1881, he was a pupil at Eagle House School, Wimbledon. He went on to Wellington College and then followed his elder brother Henry Hercules Cobbe to the Royal Military College, Sandhurst, from where he passed out in September 1889. At the age of 19 he was commissioned a second lieutenant in the South Wales Borderers.

== Early military career ==
The highlights of Cobbe's military career can be tracked by the regular records of his promotions and deeds published in the London Gazette. In March 1892, he was promoted to lieutenant, and later in the same year, he was seconded to the Indian Army Staff Corps. This secondment led to his permanent transfer from the South Wales Borderers in 1894. The purpose of the Indian Staff Corps was not only to provide officers for headquarters' staff but, far more broadly, for the native Indian regiments, the army departments and also for civil and political appointments for which Indian Army officers might be eligible. In 1903, in order to avoid confusion, the designation 'Indian Staff Corps' as applied to officers on regimental duty was withdrawn and replaced by the more appropriate term 'Indian Army', which is how Cobbe was referred to in all later Gazette entries. In India, in 1895 Cobbe gained his first medal, the India Medal (1895–1902), with the clasp “Relief of Chitral”. This campaign was one of the many on the Northwest Frontier to quell unrest against British rule.

His next medals, however, were to be gained in Africa. At this time many regiments of the Indian Army were sent to Africa to support British foreign policy in the region. On this continent Cobbe was kept busy on several minor colonial campaigns gaining him the Central Africa Medal with clasp "Central Africa 1894–1898", the East and West Africa Medal (1887–1900) and the Africa General Service Medal with the clasp "B.C.A 1898–1899" (British Central Africa, later Nyasaland and today Malawi). In October 1899, Cobbe was appointed second in command of the 1st Battalion, Central African Rifles, and given the local rank of captain.

== Ashanti War ==
By July 1900, Cobbe was commanding the Central Africa Regiment and had been given the local rank of major. Earlier that year, a major rebellion had erupted in West Africa, in what is now Ghana (Gold Coast), and this developed into the final campaign of the Ashanti Wars, known as the War of the Golden Stool.

The initial thrust of the campaign was to relieve the fort at Kumasi, which was achieved by the end of July. Cobbe was then sent out with a column of 300 men to help clear the surrounding area. In the dense bush, he came across a large body of the enemy protected by stout stockades. After heavy fighting, Cobbe managed to outflank the enemy and put them to flight, although himself being "severely wounded". This did not prevent some veiled criticism from his commander concerning the delay in putting in the final attack and Cobbe did not feature among the 20 or so individuals mentioned in the despatch as being recommended for favourable notice for having "rendered good service", although he was listed among those "having done good work". Despite his wounds, by late September he was involved in further clearing up operations and led his men on the left flank of a major attack. On the right was Major Charles John Melliss, who was to be awarded the VC in this campaign. In the next despatch Cobbe was individually mentioned: "Captain (local Major) A. S. Cobbe, Indian Staff Corps. – Severely wounded 6 August. He is an Officer to be thoroughly trusted, and commanded in several fights, where he invariably did well. I hope he will be rewarded." Cobbe was indeed rewarded as in November 1900 he was promoted to the substantive rank of captain in the Indian Staff Corps, and made a Companion of the Distinguished Service Order (DSO), as well as being awarded the Ashanti Medal with clasp "Kumassi".

== Somaliland Campaign ==
In January 1902, Cobbe was granted the local rank of lieutenant colonel and appointed Commandant of the 1st (Central Africa) Battalion, King's African Rifles, and in this post, he deployed with his men to British Somaliland (now Somaliland) to take part in the Somaliland campaign or the "Mad Mullah War". The Mullah Mohammed Abdullah Hassan, lead clergyman of King Diiriye Guure, had been agitating against British rule in the Somaliland Protectorate since 1899 and in 1901, a first British expedition beat him and his Dervish forces and caused him to retreat into the desert interior. However, by the end of the year the Diiriye Guure had recommenced raiding and a second expedition, including Cobbe and his men, was mounted against him. On 6 October, while marching through dense bush at Erigo, the British force was ambushed and then rushed by the Dervishes. Although the north face of the square was pierced and a Maxim gun lost, the Yao Company of the Central Africa Battalion recovered the situation. The Diiriye Guure force lost some 700 men and retreated. The British force was not able to continue the pursuit, and returned to Berbera. The Maxim lost during the battle was recovered in the last campaign against Diiriye Guure in 1920, and stands in the Malawi Army's "Cobbe Barracks" in Zomba, Malawi.

=== Victoria Cross ===
It was at Erigo (or Erego) during this campaign that Cobbe was awarded his Victoria Cross. The announcement of the award was made in the London Gazette of 20 January 1903 with the description of his act of courage as follows:

During the action at Erego, on 6 October 1902, when some of the Companies had retired, Lieutenant-Colonel Cobbe was left by himself in front of the line, with a Maxim gun. Without assistance, he brought in the Maxim, and worked it at a most critical time. He then went out under an extremely hot fire from the enemy about 20 yards in front of him, and from his own men (who had retired) about the same distance behind, and succeeded in carrying in a wounded Orderly.

== Further campaigning ==
Still in British Somaliland in 1903, Cobbe was commanding a flying column ahead of the main body moving against Diiriye Guure. He had orders to secure the water supply at Wardair. Having established a zariba (a camp fortified with a thorn hedge) near Gumburu, he had cause to send forward a company of men under Lieutenant Colonel Plunkett to secure the return of a small scouting party. The company was overwhelmed by a large Dervish force and Plunkett, all his British and Indian soldiers, and most of the Central African soldiers with him were killed. It was a major disaster. Cobbe testified that he had given Plunkett strict instructions not to engage the main body of the enemy and explicitly stated that Plunkett had disobeyed his orders. Cobbe was at the final major battle of the war, Jidballi, on 10 January 1904, but seems to have attracted no mention in despatches. The Somali campaign added two clasps to his Africa General Service Medal: "Somaliland 1902–04" and "Jidballi".

As a further reward for his services, in September 1904, Cobbe was noted for consideration of the brevet rank of lieutenant colonel on attaining the rank of major and in December 1907, immediately after having been promoted to substantive major, he was duly further promoted to brevet lieutenant colonel. In February of that year Cobbe, had been appointed a staff captain at headquarters in India, but that lasted only until February 1908, his new rank presumably deserving a more senior post. In April 1910, he was appointed a Staff Officer Grade 1 and in May 1912 he was promoted colonel with seniority from 2 December 1911 although, when appointed an aide-de-camp to the King in June 1912, he is described as a brevet colonel. In 1911, he was awarded the King George V's Coronation Medal.

== First World War ==
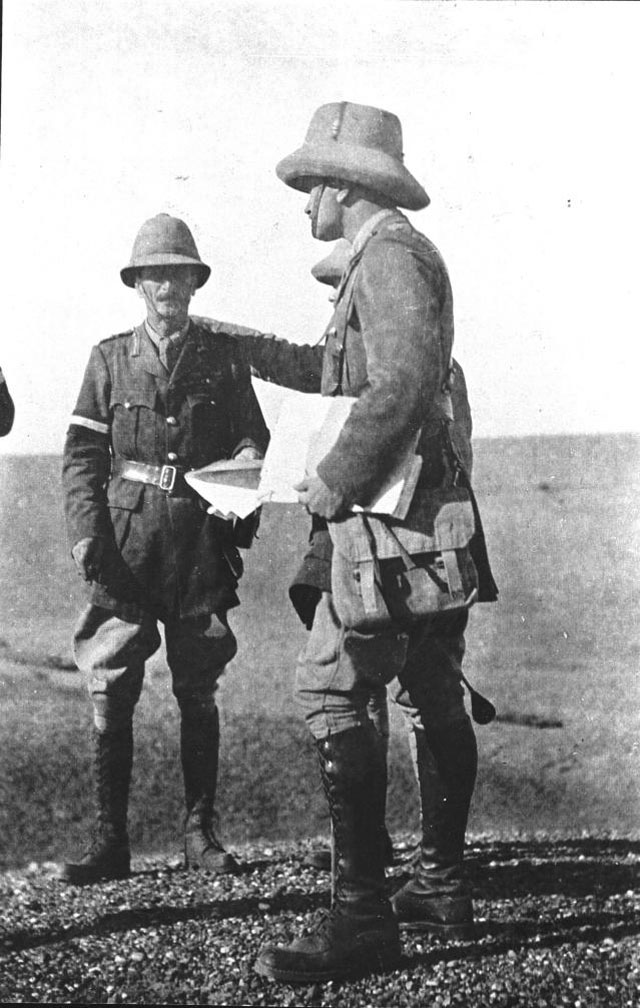
Lieutenant General Sir Alexander Cobbe in Iraq, late 1917

Cobbe's Grade I staff posting in India lasted until June 1914 and three months later he was in France. Michael Jones, in his book Colworth in Context, says,

Lieutenant-Colonel Alexander Cobbe VC, a career soldier, left in September 1914 to join an Indian Sikh regiment at the front line with William Eyre, one of Albert Bowen's employees, as his personal servant.

In February 1915 Cobbe was appointed a Deputy Adjutant and Quartermaster General with the temporary rank of brigadier general. In a despatch of 14 January 1915 Field Marshal Sir John French, commander-in-chief (C-in-C) of the British Expeditionary Force (BEF), mentioned Colonel Cobbe for gallant and distinguished service in the field. A similar mention was published in June 1915 and was soon followed by the appointment of Cobbe as a Companion of the Order of the Bath (CB) in the 1915 Birthday Honours. In July he succeeded Brigadier General Robert Whigham as brigadier general, general staff (BGGS) of Lieutenant General Sir Hubert Gough's I Corps. In November he was promoted from major to lieutenant colonel in the British Indian Army. In the following month, Cobbe was yet again mentioned in Field Marshal French's despatches for gallant and distinguished service in the field, this time in a list which also included his brother, Lieutenant Colonel H. H. Cobbe, DSO, 13th Lancers.

In February 1916, Cobbe handed over his staff job in France and in March was posted back to India as Director of Staff Duties and Military Training at Army Headquarters, while retaining his temporary rank. Following yet another mention for his good services in France, this time in a despatch from Field Marshal Sir Douglas Haig dated April 1916, he was promoted to major general in June 1916, the appointment specifically stating that it was a reward for "Distinguished Service in the Field". Within two months Cobbe was promoted to temporary lieutenant general, and in March 1917, he was appointed a Knight Commander of the Order of the Bath.

By this time Cobbe was in Mesopotamia (now Iraq), where he would spend the rest of the war and stay until late 1919. As the commander of III Indian Corps, he served under three successive C-in-Cs, Mesopotamian Field Force, all of whom mentioned him generously in their despatches to the War Office. He was present at the capture of Kut-al-Amara in February 1917, and the capture of Baghdad the following month. Playing a notable role in the British successes at Samarrah in April, and at Ramadi in September 1917, Cobbe also defeated a Turk force at Sharqat in October 1918 (the final action on the Mesopotamian Front) before peacefully capturing Mosul in November 1918.

His service in the First World War added to Cobbe's medal collection: the 1914 Star with clasp "5thAug-22ndNov 1914", the British War Medal 1914–1920 and the Victory Medal 1914–1919. France appointed him a Commander of the Legion of Honour, and the King of Italy made him a Commander of the Order of Saints Maurice and Lazarus. In March 1919 he was appointed Knight Commander of the Order of the Star of India.

== Later career ==
In June 1919, Cobbe was made a substantive lieutenant general, and was appointed Military Secretary to the India Office in 1920. Promotion to general came on 14 February 1924 just prior to his appointment as General Officer Commanding-in-Chief of India's Northern Command. On his return to England he was reappointed in June 1930 as Military Secretary to the India Office.

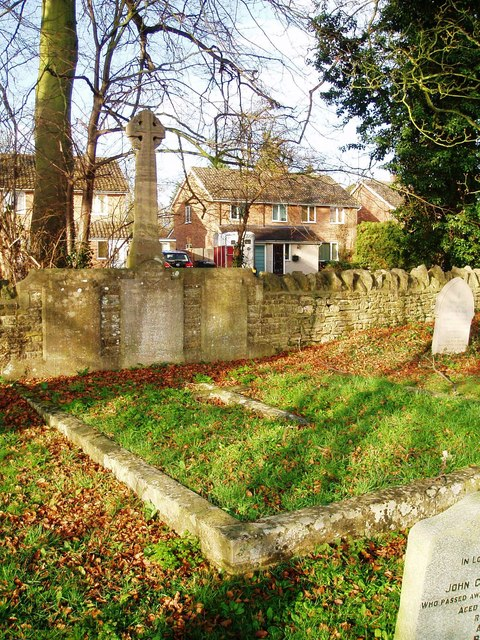
The Grave of General Sir Alexander Cobbe VC in Sharnbrook

Honours continued to come Cobbe's way. In 1922, he was appointed Colonel of his first regiment, The South Wales Borderers. In the 1928 New Year Honours, he was made a Knight Grand Cross of the Order of the Bath, and in June 1930 he was appointed ADC General to His Majesty. The following month he was appointed Colonel of the Sikh Pioneers. However, a lifetime of soldiering in severe climates and arduous conditions had had its effect and, at the age of just 61, General Sir Alexander Cobbe died on 29 June 1931. He is buried alone in the churchyard of Sharnbrook, Bedfordshire.

== Family life ==
On 1 October 1910, the 40-year-old Cobbe married the 23-year-old Winifred Ada Bowen, daughter of Sir Albert Bowen, 1st Baronet, and his wife Alice Anita Crowther. Sir Albert was the lord of the manor of Colworth, in the parish of Sharnbrook. It is not clear how much time Alexander Cobbe was able to spend with his wife in their 21 years of marriage, the First World War certainly causing them to be parted for long periods, with Winifred mainly staying at Colworth. However, they had two daughters, Winifred Alice (b 1912) and Anne Philippa and a son, Alexander William Locke, known as Bill, born 1919.

As a flying officer in the Royal Air Force, Bill Cobbe was killed on 8 September 1940 during the Battle of Britain.

== Legacy ==
The headquarters of the Malawi Army are named the "Cobbe Barracks" in his honour. They are located at Zomba, the former capital, and are home to what were the King's African Rifles (now the Malawi Rifles).

== The medal ==
His Victoria Cross is displayed at the Regimental Museum of The Royal Welsh (The Barracks, Brecon, Powys, Wales).

Military offices
| Preceded by Sir Herbert Cox | Military Secretary to the India Office; 1920–1926 | Succeeded by Sir Claud Jacob |
| Preceded by Sir Claud Jacob | GOC-in-C, Northern Command, India; 1926–1930 | Succeeded by Sir Robert Cassels |
| Preceded by Sir Claud Jacob | Military Secretary to the India Office; 1930–1931 | Succeeded by Sir Sydney Muspratt |
