= George Molesworth =

British Indian Army general (1890–1968)

Lieutenant-General George Molesworth CSI CBE
- Born: 14 July 1890; India
- Died: 1968
- Military career
- Allegiance: United Kingdom
- Branch: British Army; British Indian Army
- Service years: 1910–1945
- Rank: Lieutenant-General
- Service number: 636
- Units: Somerset Light Infantry; 15th Punjab Regiment
- Commands: 4th Battalion, 15th Punjab Regiment (1934–36)
- Conflicts: First World War; Third Anglo-Afghan War; Second World War
- Awards: Companion of the Order of the Star of India; Commander of the Order of the British Empire; Mentioned in Despatches

Lieutenant-General George Noble Molesworth, CSI, CBE (14 July 1890 – 1968) was an officer commissioned into the British Army serving in India. He saw active service in the Third Anglo-Afghan War, later transferred to the British Indian Army and rose to oversee intelligence and to be Deputy Chief of General Staff of Army Headquarters India. He also served as Military Secretary to the India Office.

== Military career ==
George Noble Molesworth was born on 14 July 1890, the eldest son of Henry B. Molesworth and grandson of Sir Guilford Molesworth. He was educated at Bradfield College and the Royal Military College, Sandhurst.

Molesworth was commissioned into the Somerset Light Infantry as a second lieutenant in March 1910. After this time he served in Malta, North China and India. He served during the First World War in India with his battalion, and served as Adjutant of the 2nd Battalion from 1916 to 1919. He saw action during the Third Anglo-Afghan War, where he was Mentioned in Despatches. He also served as Deputy Assistant Adjutant General at Army Headquarters India during 1919 and 1921 and in 1924, and was made Brigade Major in 1925. Between the years 1926 and 1927 he served as Deputy Assistant Quartermaster General at Army Headquarters India.

After attending the Staff College, Quetta from 1921 to 1922, Molesworth transferred to the Indian Army and the 1st battalion 15th Punjab Regiment in 1927. He served as instructor at the Staff College, Quetta, from 1929 to 1933. He was promoted to brevet lieutenant colonel in 1932. Two years later, in 1934, was appointed to commanded the 4th Battalion, 15th Punjab Regiment; he also attended the Imperial Defence College in 1935.

From October 1936 to September 1938, Molesworth served as deputy director of Military Operations and Intelligence at Army Headquarters India, before being promoted to Director of Military Operations and Intelligence in September 1938. He served in this position until May 1940 before becoming Deputy Chief of General Staff at Army Headquarters India, a role he held until April 1943. From July 1943 to December 1944 he served as Military Secretary to the India Office; he retired in February 1945.

Molesworth was Colonel of the 4th Battalion, 15th Punjab Regiment from 1941 to 1960. He was appointed a Companion of the Order of the Star of India in 1941, an Officer of the Order of the British Empire in 1950 and advanced to Commander of the Order of the British Empire in 1958.

== Family ==
In 1927 Molesworth married Marjorie Frances Simpson.

== Bibliography ==
- Smart, Nick (2005). Biographical Dictionary of British Generals of the Second World War. Barnesley: Pen & Sword Military. ISBN 978-1-84415-049-6. OCLC 58555546.

== Publications ==
- Afghanistan 1919 : an Account of Operations in the Third Afghan War. Asia Publishing House. 1962. OCLC 7233999.
- Generals of World War II

Military offices
Preceded by Sir Robert Lockhart	Military Secretary to the India Office; 1943–1944	Succeeded by Sir Mosley Mayne
