= James Salmond (East India Company officer) =

Major-General James Salmond
- Born: 17 August 1766 or 17 November 1766
- Died: 1 November 1837
- Military career
- Allegiance: United Kingdom
- Branch: British Indian Army
- Rank: Major-General

Major-General James Hanson Salmond (1766–1837) was an officer in the East India Company's Forces who went on to be Military Secretary to the East India Company.

== Military career ==
Salmond, a subaltern in the East India Company's Forces, was commissioned into the British Army in 1796. He was appointed Adjutant of the 1st Regiment of Royal East India Volunteers later that year.

He was appointed Military Secretary to the East India Company in 1809 and promoted to Major-General in 1837.

He also wrote a history of the Anglo-Mysore Wars.

== Family ==
In 1798 he married Louisa Scott and then in 1808 he married Rachel Mary Ann Constable.

By his first wife, he had a son, Lieutenant Colonel James Salmond (1805-1880), who married Emma Isabella Coke (d. 1886), daughter of D'ewes Coke (1774-1856). One of their sons was Sir William Salmond.

By his second wife, he had a son, Edward Salmond (1809-1821).

== Ancestry ==
Ancestors of James Salmond (East India Company officer)

4. Capt. James Salmond of Antigua (1694-1746)
2. William Salmond (1737-1779)
10. William Kennedy of Antigua
5. Lydia Kennedy (d. 1748)
1. James Hanson Salmond
6. Edward Hasell (d. 1781)
3. Jane Hasell (1745-1820)
28. Philip Musgrave (d. 1689), son of Sir Christopher Musgrave, 4th Baronet
14. Sir Christopher Musgrave, 5th Baronet
29. Hon. Mary Legge, daughter of George Legge, 1st Baron Dartmouth
7. Julia Musgrave (1716-1778)
15. Julia Chardin

Military offices
| Preceded by New Post | Military Secretary to the East India Company; 1809–1837 | Succeeded by Philip Melvill |
