= William Henry Melvill =

British civil servant and solicitor

Sir William Henry Melvill (26 September 1827 – 18 March 1911) was a British barrister and civil servant who was Solicitor to the Board of Inland Revenue from 1866 to 1894.

== Early life and education ==
Melvill was born in Islington, London, the third son and one of nine children of Sir James Cosmo Melvill, Permanent Under-Secretary for India, and Hester Jane Frances Sellon. His father was the eldest surviving son of Scottish philanthropist Philip Melvill (1762–1811), Lieut.-Governor of Pendennis Castle. The Melvill family became prominent through the East India Company. His uncles included Sir Peter Melvill, Philip Melvill, and Rev. Henry Melvill.

He was educated at Rugby and at Trinity College, Cambridge.

== Career ==
In 1853, Melvill was called to the Bar at Lincoln's Inn. He was appointed junior counsel to the Crown in 1865. The following year, then-Chancellor of the Exchequer William Ewart Gladstone appointed him Solicitor to the Board of Inland Revenue, a post which he held until his retirement in 1894. During his tenure, he was associated with successive Chancellors of the Exchequer in the preparation of their various Budgets.

He was knighted in 1888.

== Family ==
In 1862, Melvill married Hon. Elizabeth Teresa (1833–1908), daughter of Thomas Lister, 2nd Baron Ribblesdale, and stepdaughter of Prime Minister John Russell, 1st Earl Russell. They had four sons:

- Russell Melvill (10 September 1863 – 17 May 1864), died in infancy
- Harry Edward Melvill (3 January 1866 – 17 April 1931), Barrister of the Inner Temple and Private Secretary to Edgar Vincent, 1st Viscount D'Abernon
- Cmdr. Francis William Melvill (10 April 1867 – 2 October 1904), Royal Navy, present at the Bombardment of Alexandria and was a member of the relieving force at the Siege of Ladysmith; drowned in Portland Harbour when serving as Commander on board HMS Illustrious (1896)
- Maj. James Lister Melvill (14 August 1878 – 26 May 1942), married in 1897 firstly to Euphemia "Effie" Edgington Cree. They divorced in 1909 and she remarried Hon. Gilbert Grosvenor, son of Lord Stalbridge; married secondly in 1913 Phoebe Georgina Frances Ruby Otway, daughter of Col. Jocelyn Otway and former wife of George Nesbitt Armstrong, only son of Dame Nellie Melba

Sir William died in 1911 in Eastbourne, Sussex.
