= Henry Melville (disambiguation) =

Henry Melville was an Australian writer.

Henry Melville may also refer to:

- Henry Melvill (1798–1871), British priest
- Henry Melville (journalist), coined the term Black War
- Henry Dundas, 1st Viscount Melville (1742–1811), Scottish politician
- Henry Dundas, 3rd Viscount Melville (1801–1876), British Army officer
- Henry William Melville (1792–1870), engraver and father of Harden Sidney Melville
- Sir William Henry Melvill (1827–1911), British barrister

== See also ==
- Henry Melville Whitney (1839–1923), American industrialist
- Harry Melville (disambiguation)
