= John Charles Robinson =

English painter and etcher (1824–1913)

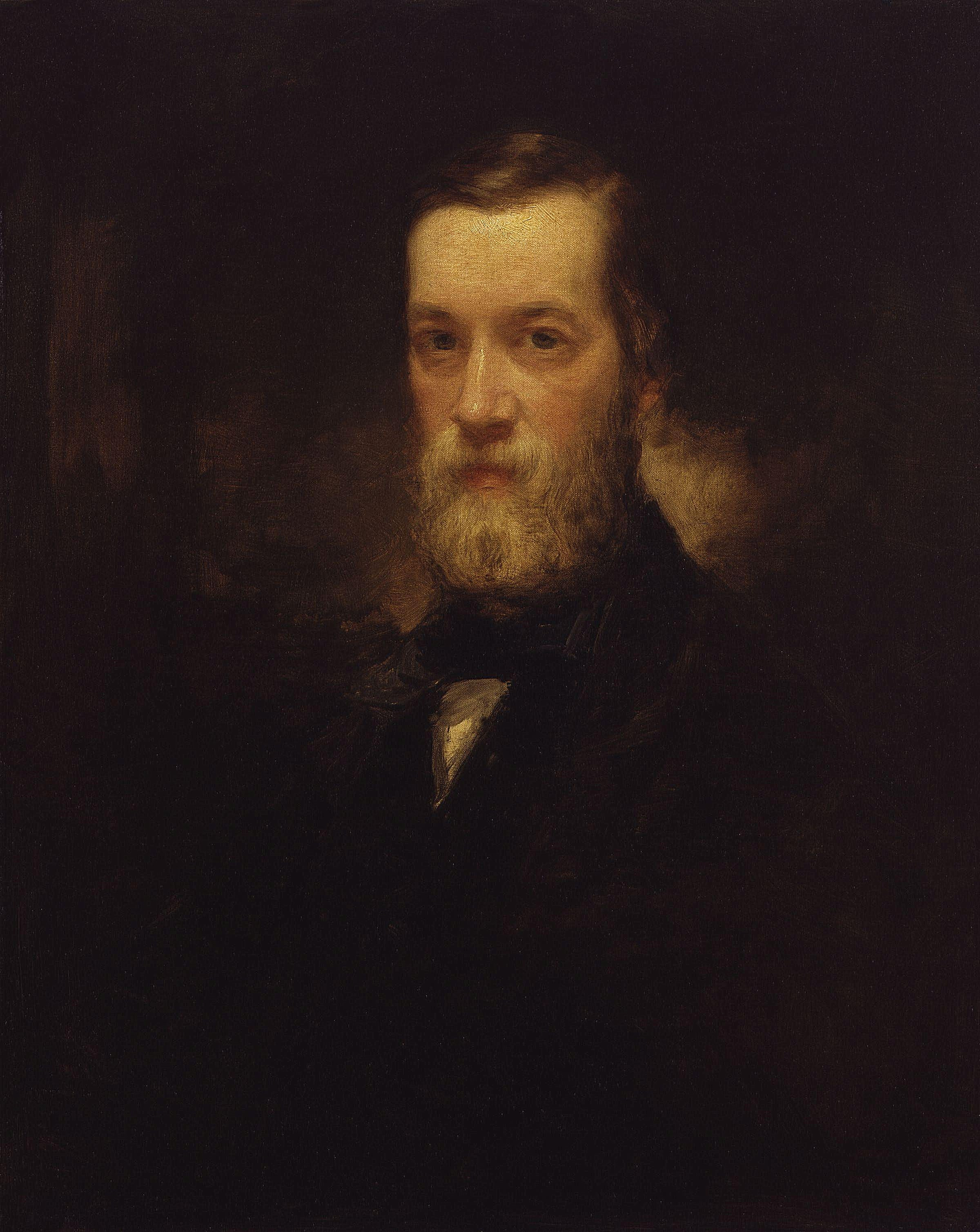
Portrait of Sir John Robinson by John James Napier (1831–1877)

Sir John Charles Robinson (16 December 1824, Nottingham – 10 April 1913, Swanage) was an English painter and etcher, although he is now better remembered as an art collector and curator.

== Biography ==
He was raised by his grandfather, who was a bookseller. He originally intended to become an architect, but studied painting instead; primarily with Michel Martin Drolling in Paris. While there, he also copied paintings in the Louvre and acquired a knowledge of Renaissance art.

He returned to England in 1847 and became a teacher at the School of Design at Hanley, Staffordshire. He was later appointed Headmaster. In 1852, he went to London to become a teacher's training master and marry Elizabeth Newton, daughter of Edmond Newton, an Alderman of Norwich.

That position lasted for only a short time, however, as he received an appointment as curator of the Museum of Ornamental Art at Marlborough House. In 1857, the collection was moved to the new South Kensington Museum (now the Victoria and Albert Museum). He served as curator there until 1863, when his position was changed to that of "Art Referee". He is particularly known for increasing the museum's collection of Italian Renaissance sculpture; including pieces acquired from the Campana collection. He also arranged travelling exhibitions for provincial institutions.

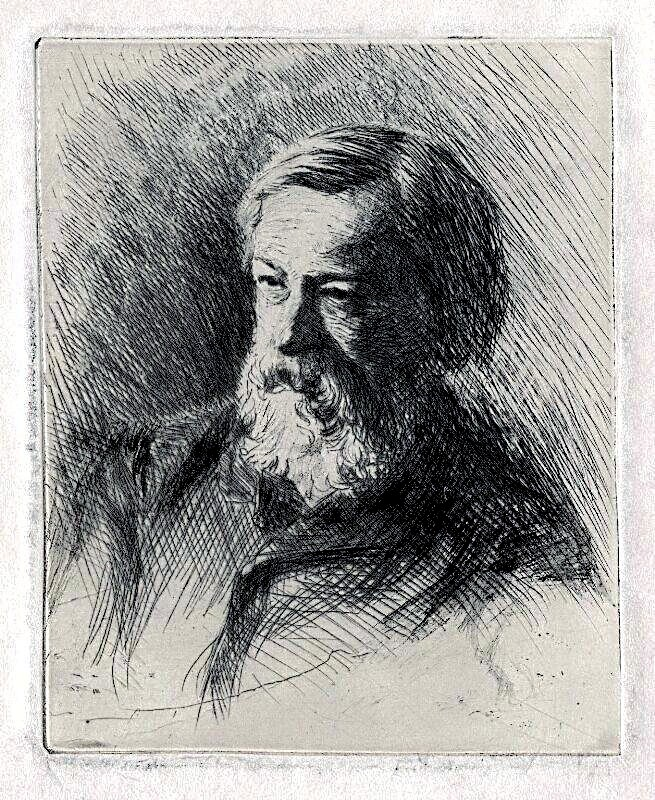
Sir John Charles Robinson. Etching by G. Robinson, 1880s–1890s

In 1856, he had created a collector's club which became the unofficial "Fine Arts Club" after the museum's opening. In 1866, it merged with the newly formed Burlington Fine Arts Club and Robinson served as its first President. He was an important figure in the Brirish Etching Revival, and with Sir Francis Seymour Haden he helped to create the Royal Society of Painter-Etchers, now known as the Royal Society of Painter-Printmakers.

He resigned from the museum in 1869; becoming an advisor to private collectors, such as Sir Francis Cook. His own collection included the usual paintings, drawings, and sketches, but also contained Greek gems, Renaissance jewellery, Oriental porcelain, French furniture, Spanish and Italian embroideries, and ancient Coptic fabrics. In terms of his own work, he was most admired for his etchings and drypoints, which may be seen at the Ashmolean Museum, Oxford.

From 1880 to 1901 he held the position of Surveyor of the Queen's Pictures. He was knighted in 1887 and named a CB in 1901. Although he wrote no books, he was a fierce and passionate critic and contributed many articles to The Times, The Nineteenth Century, and other noted journals. He also produced a catalogue raisonné of the drawings of Michelangelo and Raphael.

After his wife died in 1908, he left London to live at his home in Swanage, where he died five years later.

== Paintings by John Charles Robinson ==
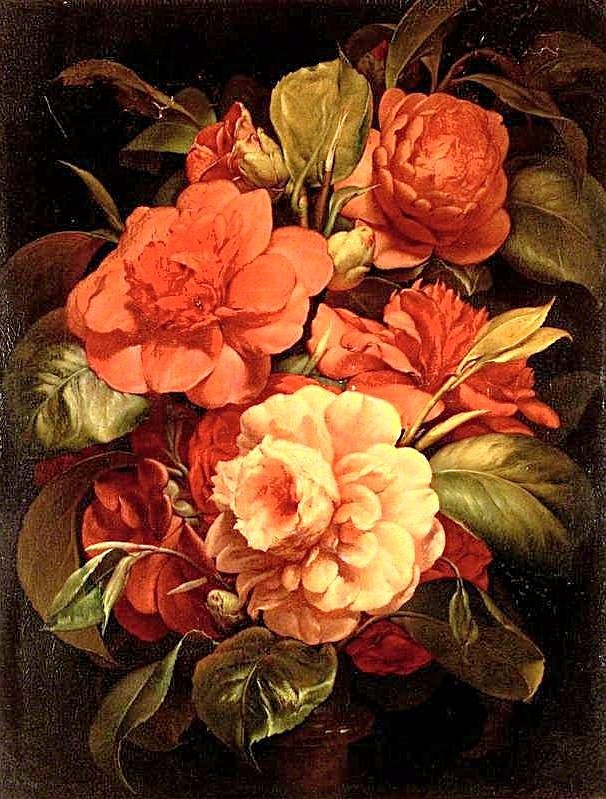
Camellias, c.1850

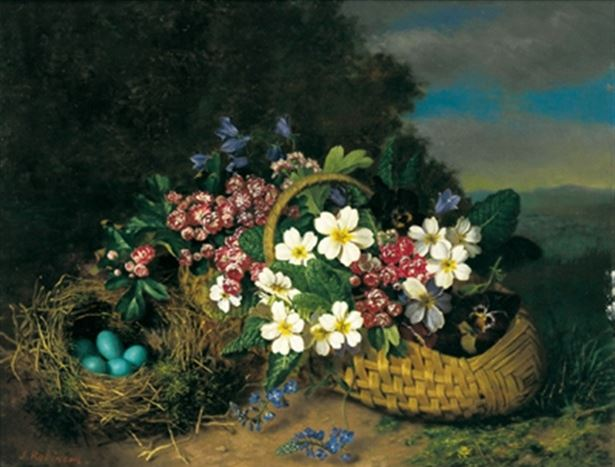
Wildflowers with Bird's Nest

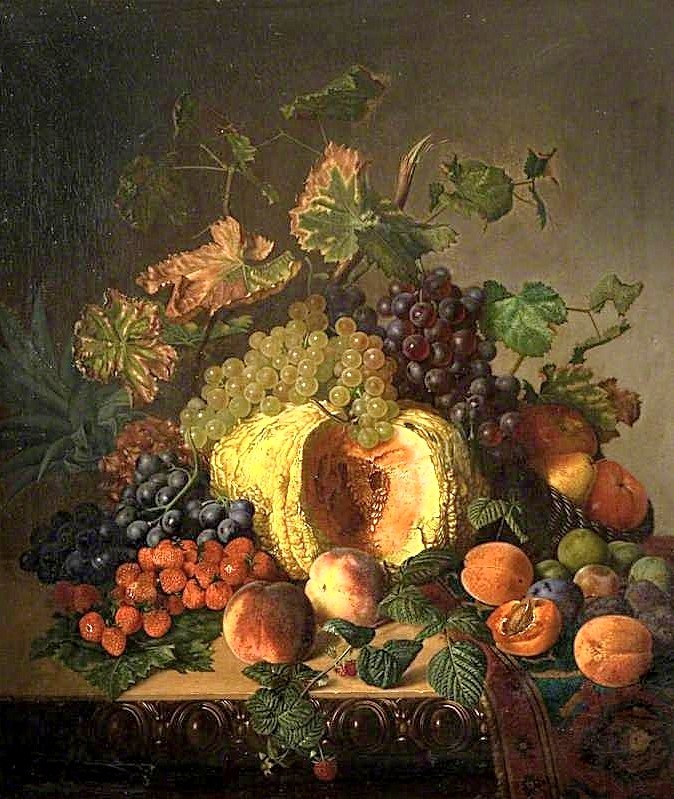
Still Life with Fruit, 1861

== Etchings by John Charles Robinson ==
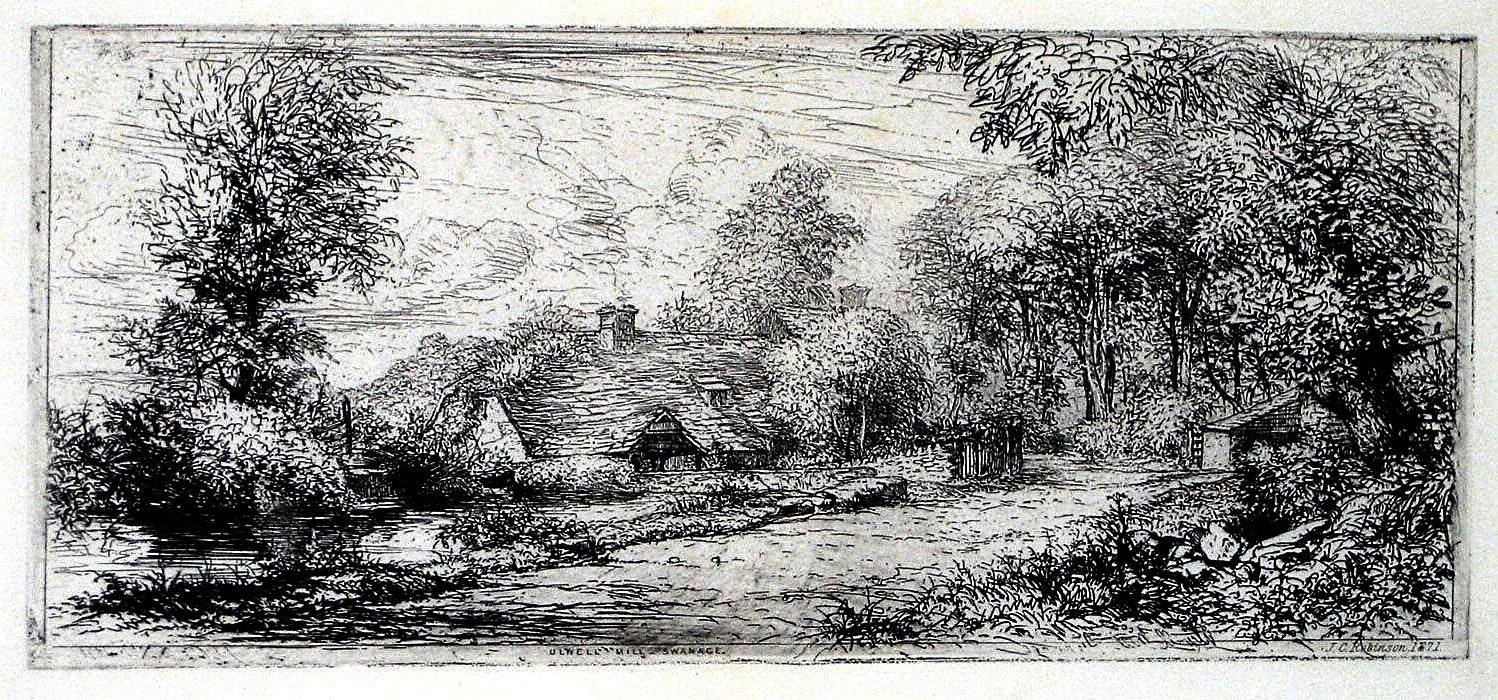
Ulwell Mill, Swanage, 1871

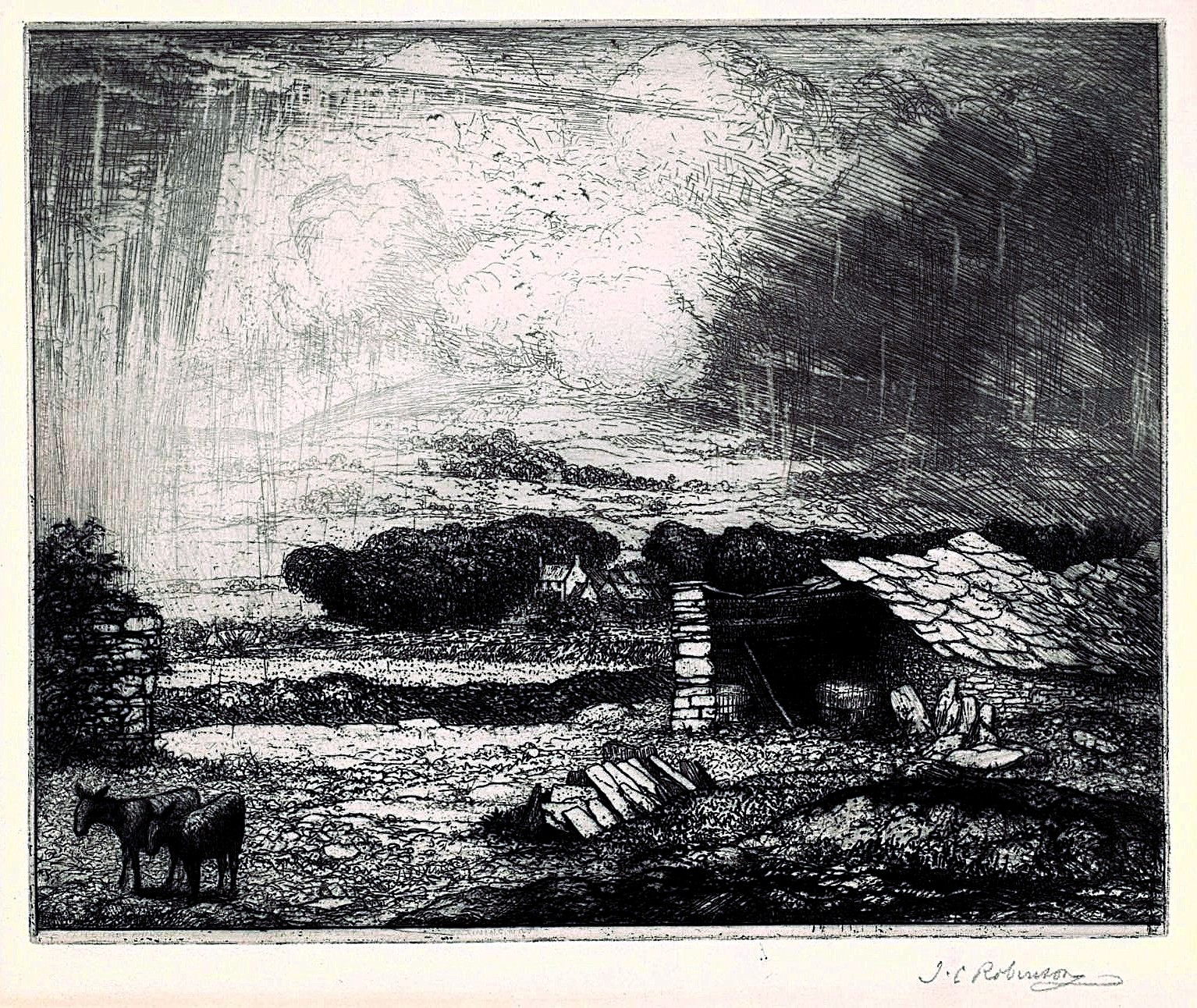
Newton Manor, Swanage

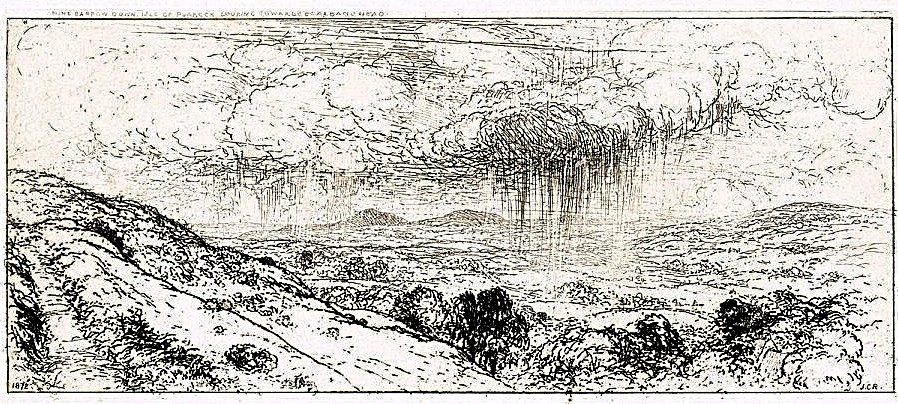
Nine Barrow Down, Isle of Purbeck, looking towards St. Alban's Head, 1872

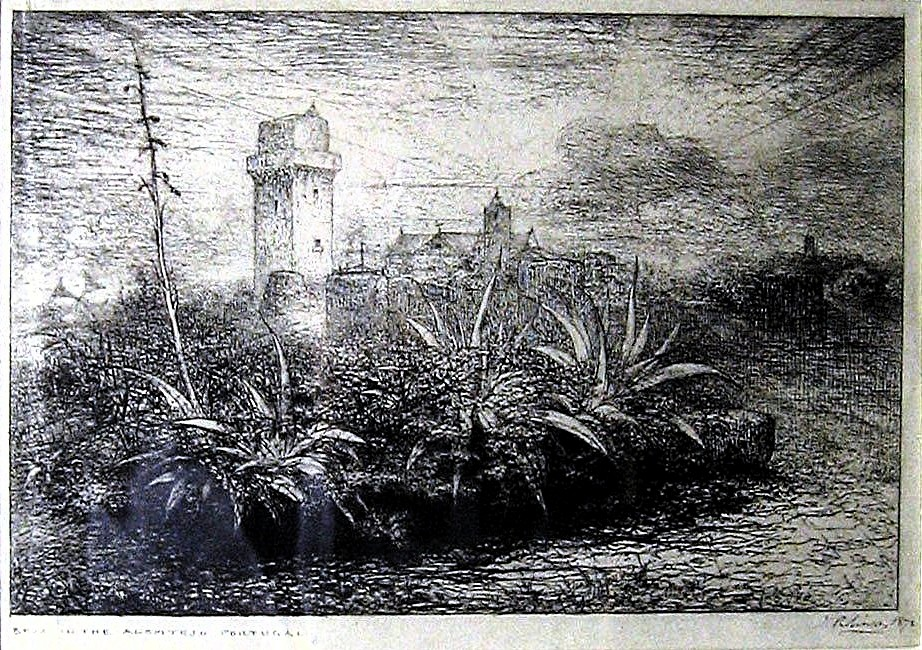
Beja in the Alentejo, 1872

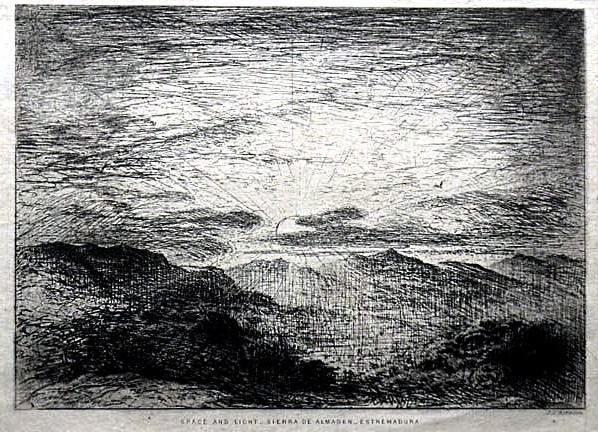
Space and Light, Sierra de Almaden, Estremadura, c. 1872

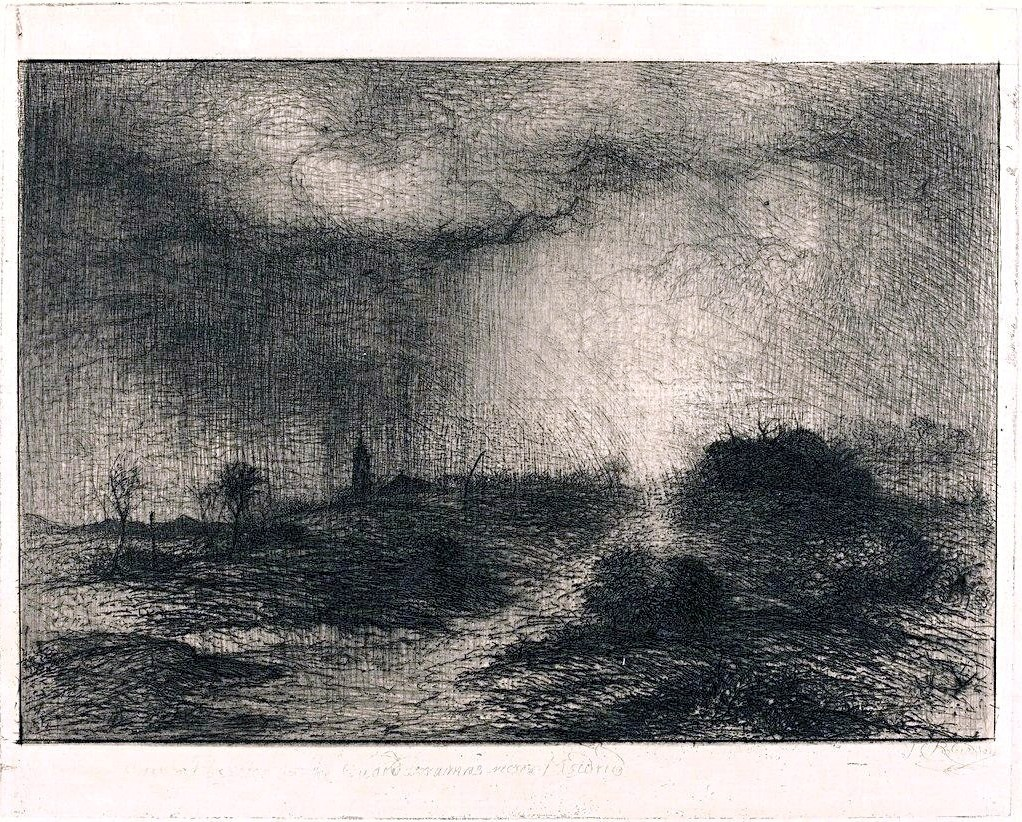
October Rain: Posuclos in the Guardarramas, Near Madrid

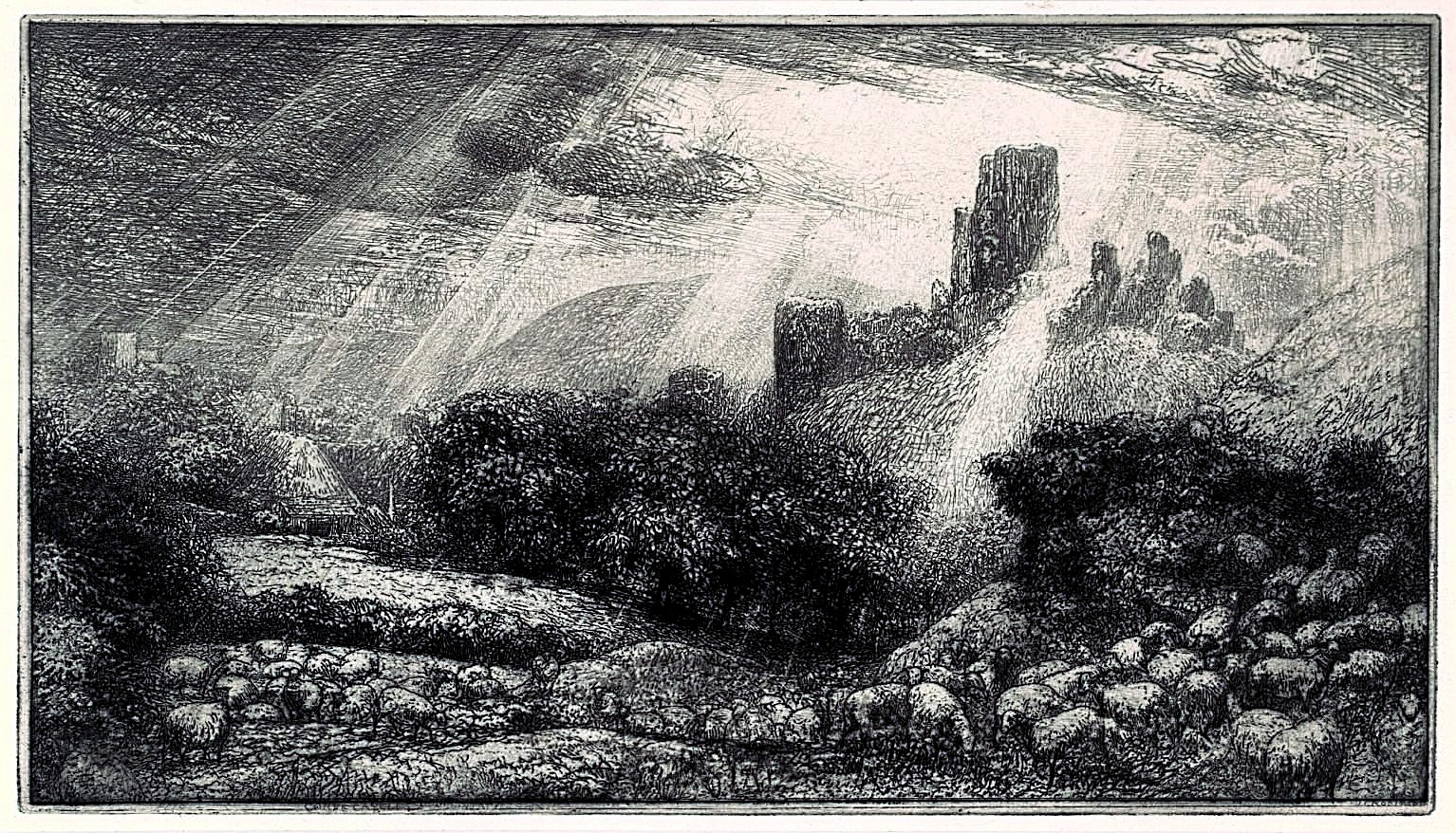
Corfe Castle – Effect of Sunshine After Rain, 1878

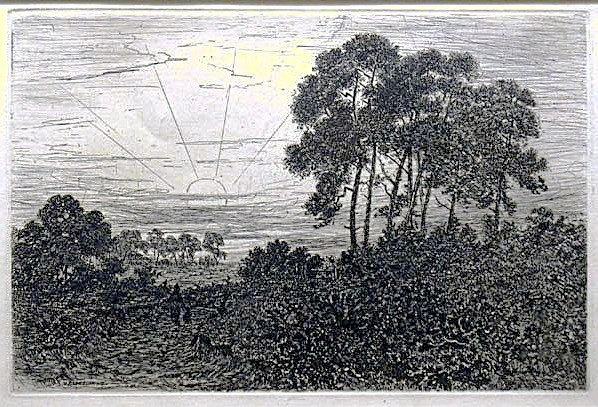
Landscape with trees and sun

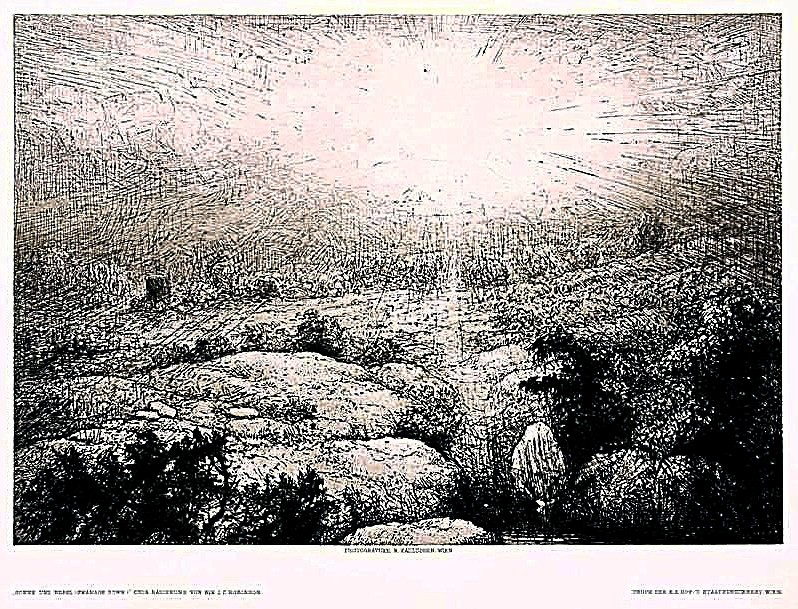
Swanage down, с. 1890
