= James Cosmo Melvill =

British administrator (1792–1861)

Sir James Cosmo Melvill KCB FRS
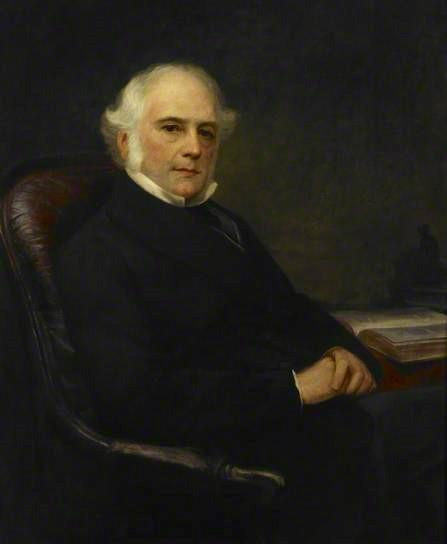
- James Cosmo Melvill by Eton Upton Ellis, c.1853.
- Born: 8 June 1792; Guernsey, United Kingdom
- Died: 23 July 1861 (aged 69); Tandridge Court, Godstone, Surrey
- Occupation: Administrator
- Spouse: Hester Jean Frances
- Children: 9, including: William Henry Melvill
- Parent: Philip Melvill (father)
- Relatives: Henry Melvill (brother); Philip Melvill (brother); Sir Peter Melvill (brother); James Cosmo Melvill (grandson)

Sir James Cosmo Melvill KCB FRS (8 June 1792 – 23 July 1861) was a British administrator who served as the last secretary of the East India Company.

== Life ==
Born at Guernsey, he was the third but eldest surviving son of Philip Melvill (1762–1811), later lieutenant-governor of Pendennis Castle in Cornwall, by his wife, Elizabeth Carey (died 1844), youngest daughter of Peter Dobrée of Beauregarde, Guernsey. Henry Melvill, Philip Melvill and Sir Peter Melvill were his younger brothers. He entered the home service of the East India Company in February 1808.

Melvill rose rapidly to the top permanent position at East India House. In 1824 he was appointed auditor of Indian accounts. While in this position he gave evidence in 1830 before a parliamentary committee, defending the company's conduct of its China trade from an attack by William Huskisson; and again in 1832 before another committee on Indian affairs in regard to the accounts of the company. In 1834 he became financial secretary, and in 1836 chief secretary, a post which he held until the termination of the company's existence as a governing body in 1858.

He once lived at Cannon Hall, Hampstead.

After his retirement from the service of the company, Melvill was appointed government director of Indian railways. He was elected a Fellow of the Royal Society on 14 January 1841, and was created a KCB on 5 September 1853.

Melvill died at Tandridge Court, near Godstone in Surrey, on 23 July 1861.

== Family ==
In March 1815, Melvill married Hester Jane Frances (died 10 April 1864), youngest daughter of William Marmaduke Sellon of Harlesden in Middlesex. They had nine children and at least 28 grandchildren:

- Henrietta (1816–1900), married in 1844 Richard Beachcroft. Mother to Florence Henrietta Beachcroft, Sir Melvill Beachcroft, Katherine Hester Beachcroft, Henry Audry Beachcroft, Emily Charlotte Beachcroft, the Rev. Charles Seward Beachcroft, Philip Edward Beachcroft and Annie Rachel Beachcroft.
- Philip Melvill (1817–1854), administrator for the East India Company. Eventually became the Chief Commissioner for affairs in the Punjab in 1853. Married in 1845 Emily Jane Hogg. Father to Emily Hester Melvill, Alice Philippa Melvill and Philip Lawrence Melvill.
- Fanny (1819–1894), married in 1854 the Rev. Henry Holme Westmore.
- James Cosmo Melvill (1821–1880), administrator in British India. Later became Assistant Under-Secretary of State for India following the termination of the East India Trading Company. Married in 1844 Eliza Jane Hardcastle. Father to James Cosmo Melvill, Marion Eliza Melvill, Evelyn Hester Melvill, Alfred Hardcastle Melvill, the Rev. Arthur Hardcastle Melvill, Emma Wilhelmina Jean Melvill, Selina Emily Melvill and Edith Mary Melvill.
- Hester (1823–1911). Twin sister to Jean. Married in 1848 Col. Thomas Fenwick of the Royal Engineers.
- Jean (1823–1911). Twin sister of Hester.
- Marion (1826–1914), married in 1848 James Alexander Wedderburn Esq. of the Madras Civil Service. Mother to James Alexander Wedderburn and Marion Hester Wedderburn, who both died in infancy. Also mother to Alexander Dundas Ogilvy Wedderburn KC and Marion Hester Wedderburn.
- Sir William Henry Melvill (1827–1911), a barrister, called to the Bar of Lincoln's Inn and practised as a Junior until appointed Solicitor to the Board of Inland Revenue. Knighted for services in 1887. He married in 1862 the Honourable Elizabeth Theresa Lister, youngest daughter of Thomas Lister, 2nd Baron Ribblesdale. Father to Russell Melvill, Harry Edward Melvill (Barrister of the Inner Temple and Private Secretary to Sir Edgar Vincent), Commander Francis William Melvill and Major James Lister Melvill.
- Rachel (1831–1913). Married in 1862 the Rev. William Henry Brendon. Mother to Rachel Mary Brendon, who married in 1897 Henry Digby Cleaver Esq, himself descendant of Isabel Plantagenet, Countess of Essex. Grandmother to Ronald Melvill Digby Cleaver.

== References and sources ==
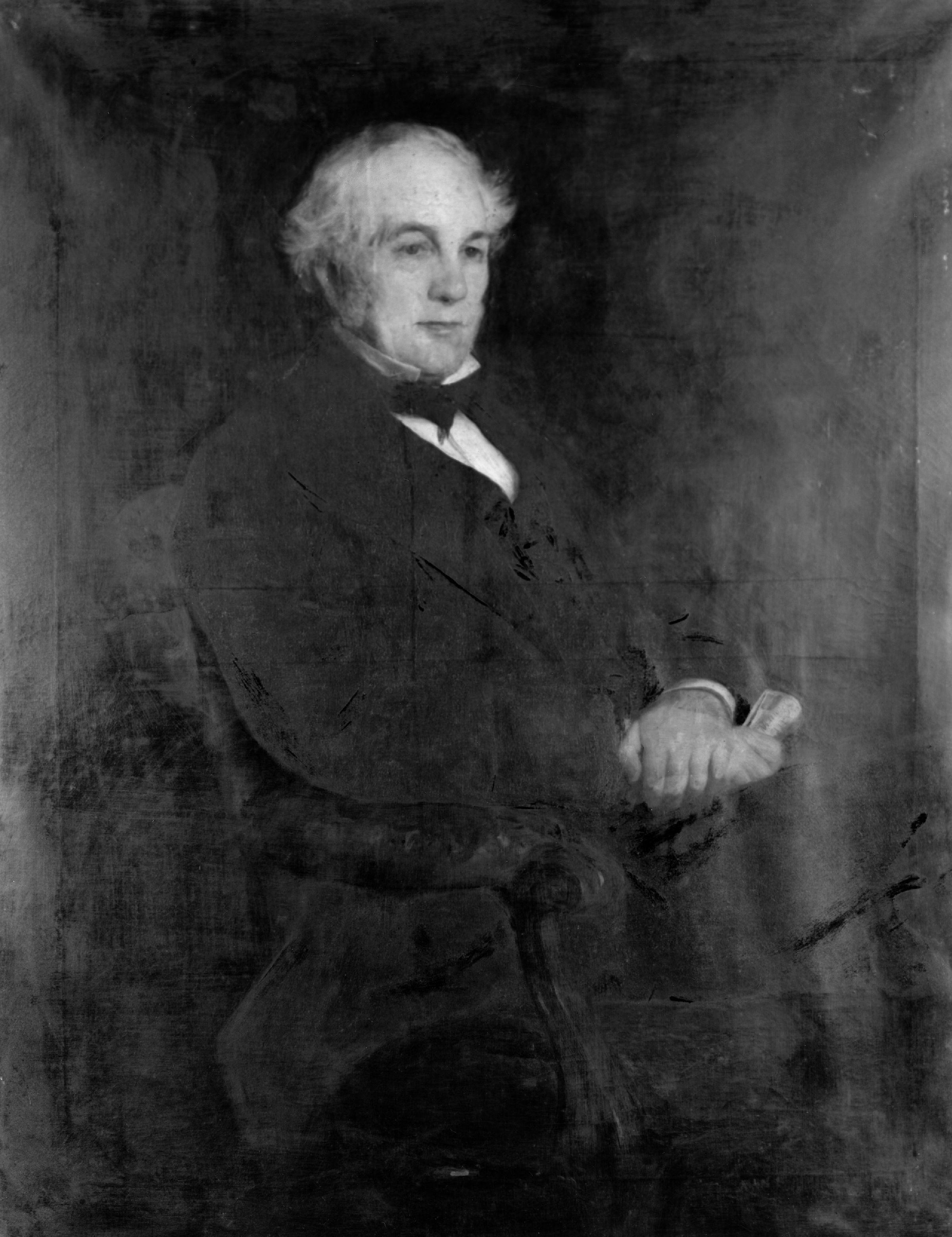
Sir James Cosmo Melvill by John James Napier

This article incorporates text from a publication now in the public domain: Lee, Sidney, ed. (1901). "Melvill, James Cosmo". Dictionary of National Biography (1st supplement). Vol. 3. London: Smith, Elder & Co.
