= Peter Melvill =

British military officer (1803–1895)

Major-General Sir Peter Melvill KCB
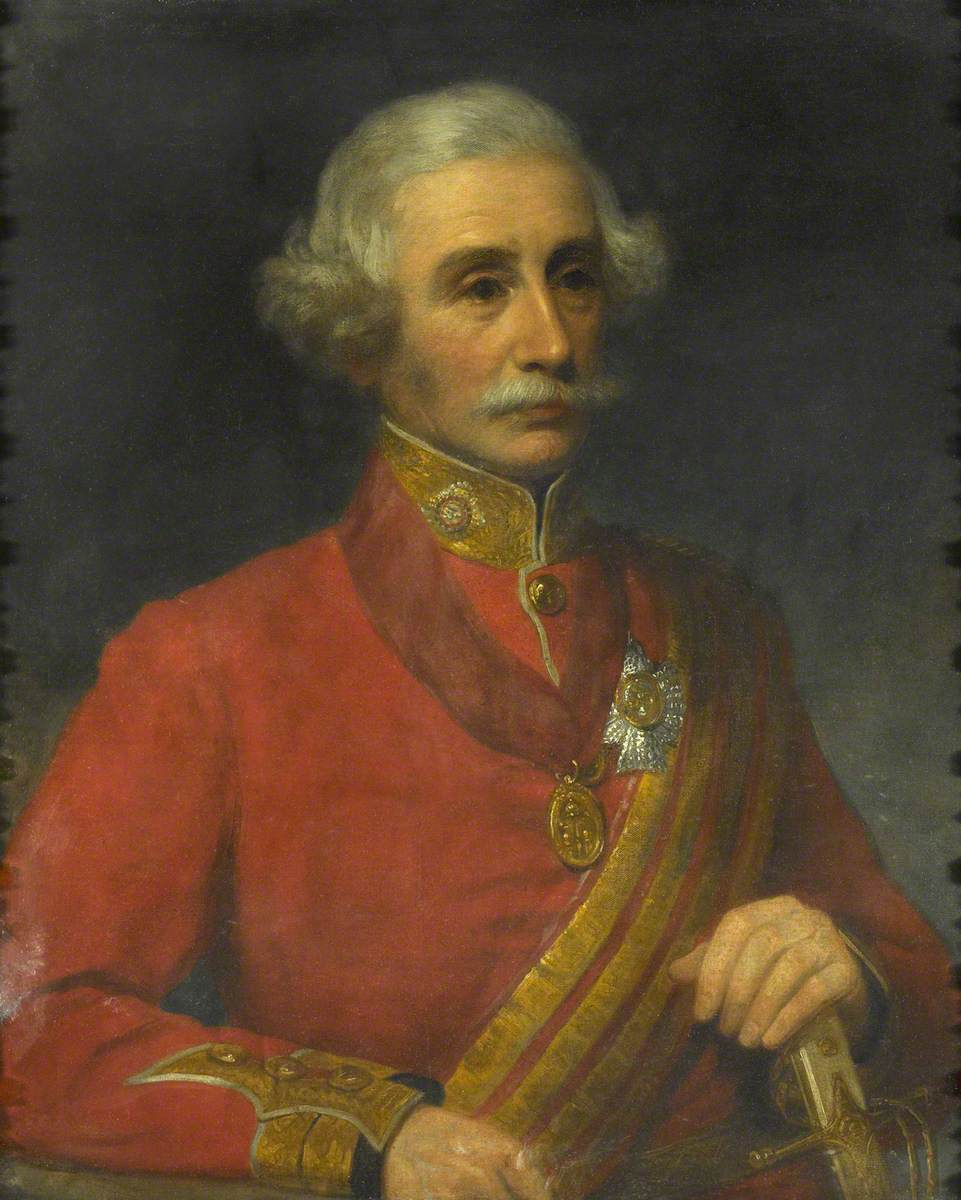
- Melvill, c. 1860, by an unknown artist
- Born: Peter Melvill Melvill; 2 July 1803; Pendennis Castle
- Died: 5 November 1895 (aged 92); Brighton, Sussex
- Spouse: Catherine Mary Robertson (after 1836)
- Parent(s): Philip Melvill; Elizabeth Carey Dobrée
- Relatives: James Cosmo Melvill (brother); Philip Melvill (brother); Henry Melvill (brother)

Major-General Sir Peter Melvill Melvill KCB (2 July 1803 – 5 November 1895) was a British military commander in the Bombay Army who was military and naval secretary to the Governor of Bombay.

== Early life ==
Melvill was born at Pendennis Castle, near Falmouth, Cornwall, where his father was Governor. He was the youngest son of Capt. Philip Melvill (1762–1811) and Elizabeth Carey Dobrée (1770–1845). His family was strongly associated with the East India Company. His elder brothers included Sir James Cosmo Melvill, secretary of the East India Company; Philip Melvill, Military Secretary to the India Office; and Henry Melvill, principal of the East India Company College.

== Career ==
He joined the Bombay Army in 1819 and was employed with the revenue survey of Gujarat from 1822–27. He served as Fort Adjutant of the garrison of Bombay and aide-to-camp to the Governor in 1828. In 1829, he was on special duty in Calcutta as assistant to the Bombay military member of the Financial Commission. In 1836, he was first assistant to the Resident in Cutch and Sind and in 1838 he officiated as Political Agent at the former place. From 1840 to 1859, he served as Secretary to the Government of Bombay.

He was knighted as a Knight Commander of the Order of the Bath in the 1860 Birthday Honours. He retired with the honorary rank of Major-General in December 1861.

== Personal life ==
In 1836, he married Catherine Mary Robertson, the daughter of John Robertson of Tweedmouth, Berwick-upon-Tweed. They had three daughters in Bombay:

- Elizabeth Margaret Melvill, who married Charles Gonne in Bombay in 1860.
- Catherine Mary Melvill (1838–1872), who married Arthur de Hochepied Larpent, 8th Baron de Hochepied, eldest son of John de Hochepied Larpent, 7th Baron de Hochepied.
- Robina Henrietta Melvill, who died young in India.

He died in Brighton, Sussex, in 1895.
