= Harry Melville =

Harry Melville may refer to:

- Harry Melville (chemist) (1908–2000), British chemist and academic administrator
- Harry Melville (rugby league) (1930–1965), Australian rugby league player

== See also ==
- Henry Melville (disambiguation)
- Melville (name)
