= Philip Sandys Melvill =

British colonial administrator (1827–1906)

Philip Sandys Melvill CSI (29 November 1827 – 2 January 1906) was a British colonial administrator in British India and a member of Henry Lawrence's "Young Men".

Melvill was born in Islington, London, the son of Philip Melvill, an East India Company officer and Military Secretary to the India Office.

He was educated at Rugby and Haileybury. He arrived in India on 4 October 1846 and entered the Bengal Civil Service as an assistant to Sir Henry Lawrence, Resident at Lahore and Agent to the Governor General of the North West Frontier. He developed a close relationship with Lawrence, and was hand-picked to become one of his "Young Men", a group of agents tasked with maintaining order and furthering British interests in the Punjab and North West Frontier. He held various posts in the Punjab Commission, working his way up from a settlement officer to Commissioner, between 1846 and 1975, working the districts of Hoshiarpur, Ambala and Jullundur. He served as a judge of the chief court of the Punjab. He was a Member of the Commission for the trial of the Gaekwar of Baroda in 1875. That same year he was appointed Resident of Baroda, where he remained until his retirement in 1881.

In 1876, he was appointed a Companion of the Order of the Star of India.

In 1851, he married Eliza Johnstone in Jullundur and they had two sons and six daughters. His younger brother was Teignmouth Melvill VC.
