= Charles Melvill =

Military leader

Charles William Melvill
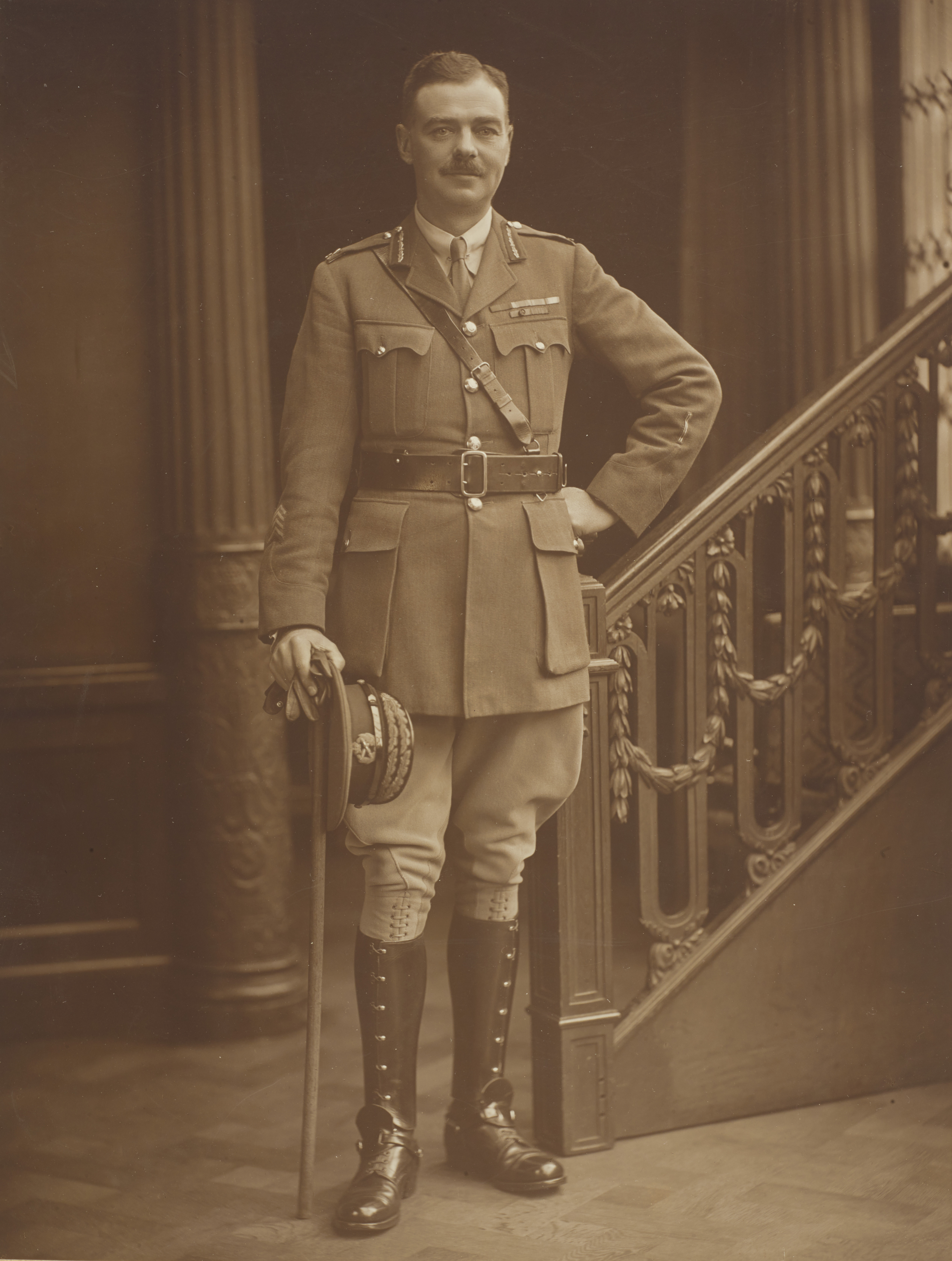
- Portrait of the then Brigadier General Charles Melvill
- Born: 5 September 1878; Bournemouth, Hampshire, England
- Died: 15 September 1925 (aged 47); Wellington, New Zealand
- Burial place: Karori Cemetery, New Zealand
- Relatives: Teignmouth Melvill (father)
- Military career
- Allegiance: United Kingdom; New Zealand
- Branch: British Army (1897–1906); New Zealand Military Forces (1911–1925)
- Service years: 1897–1906; 1914–1925
- Rank: Major General
- Commands: Commandant of the New Zealand Military Forces; 1st Infantry Brigade; 4th Battalion, New Zealand Rifle Brigade (Earl of Liverpool's Own)
- Conflicts: Second Boer War; First World War; Gallipoli campaign; Western Front
- Awards: Companion of the Order of the Bath; Companion of the Order of St Michael and St George; Distinguished Service Order; Mentioned in Despatches (4); Officer of the Order of the Crown (Belgium); Croix de guerre (Belgium)

Major General Charles William Melvill, CB, CMG, DSO (9 September 1878 – 15 September 1925) was a soldier who served with the British Army for several years before joining the New Zealand Military Forces. He participated in the First World War with the New Zealand Division and commanded infantry brigades on the Western Front. At the time of his death, he was Commandant of the New Zealand Military Forces.

== Early life ==
Charles William Melvill was born in Bournemouth (then part of Hampshire), England, on 9 September 1878, the youngest son of Teignmouth Melvill. His father was an officer in the British Army and served in the 24th Regiment of Foot. He was posthumously awarded the Victoria Cross for his efforts to save his regiment's colours after the Battle of Isandlwana, the first major engagement of the Zulu War. Educated at Wellington College in Berkshire, Melvill followed his father into the British Army, joining in 1897.

After graduating, Melvill was commissioned as a second lieutenant into the South Lancashire Regiment, on 7 September 1897. It was with his regiment that he later fought in the Second Boer War. He was promoted to lieutenant in October 1899. After the war, he served in India for several years and eventually left the service in 1906 with the rank of captain.

== New Zealand ==
In 1907 Melvill emigrated to New Zealand to take up farming in the Otago region but this new lifestyle transpired to only be for a few years. In 1911 he joined the newly established New Zealand Staff Corps, the professional cadre of the New Zealand Military Forces then being reorganised by its commandant, Major General Alexander Godley. For the next two years, he assisted in the administration and training of the newly established Territorial Force (TF). He was also brigade major of the Auckland Infantry Brigade, a TF formation.

== First World War ==
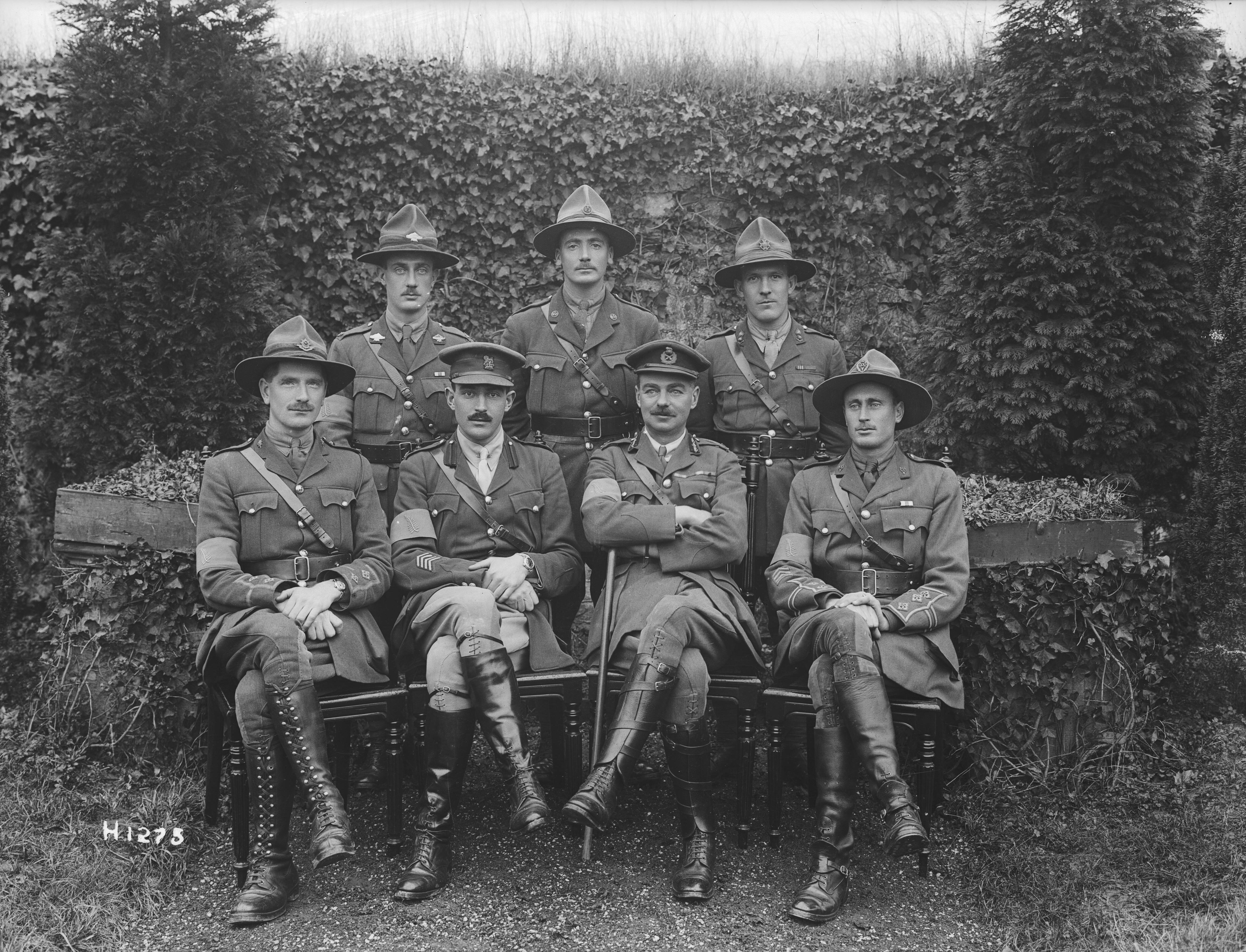
Melvill with some of his brigade staff officers, 1918

In England attending the Staff College at Camberley when the First World War broke out, Melvill returned to his former unit, the South Lancashire Regiment. He embarked for the Western Front in August as part of the "Old Contemptibles" and was wounded the following month. After recovering from his wounds, he was posted to the School of Instruction, Westminster Command, as chief instructor. He then served as brigade major for the Tay Defences from May to September 1915 before transferring to the New Zealand Expeditionary Force (NZEF), which at the time was engaged in the Gallipoli campaign. Initially a staff officer, he served under Brigadier General William Braithwaite as brigade major of the New Zealand Rifle Brigade following the evacuation of the Allied forces from Gallipoli in December.

When the New Zealand Division was formed in early 1916, Melvill was promoted to lieutenant colonel and given command of the 4th Battalion of the New Zealand Rifle Brigade, leading it through the Battle of the Somme, the first major engagement of the war for the division. He later commanded 2nd Infantry Brigade for a period of time before returning to his battalion. He was awarded the Distinguished Service Order at the end of the year.

In 1917, Melvill took over command of the 1st Infantry Brigade during the Battle of Messines when its previous commander, Brigadier General Charles Henry Brown, was killed during an artillery barrage. Promoted to temporary brigadier general, he was made a Companion of the Order of St Michael and St George for his leadership of the brigade during the Battle of Broodseinde on 4 October 1917.

During the German spring offensive of 1918, Operation Michael, Melvill's brigade played key roles in holding and stabilising the lines in the New Zealand sector. Well regarded for his capable leadership, he also led the New Zealand Division from late-June to mid-July 1918 while its nominal commander, Major General Andrew Russell was on sick leave. In the Hundred Days Offensive, his leadership of 1st Infantry Brigade saw it breach the Hindenburg Line and capture the town of Crevecoeur during the Battle of the Canal du Nord on 28 September. For this, and his earlier exploits during the German offensive, he was appointed a Companion of the Order of the Bath in the 1919 King's Birthday Honours. By the end of the war, he had been mentioned in despatches four times. Belgium also recognised his contributions to the war effort; he was appointed as an Officer of the Order of the Crown as well as being awarded the Croix de Guerre.

== Later life ==
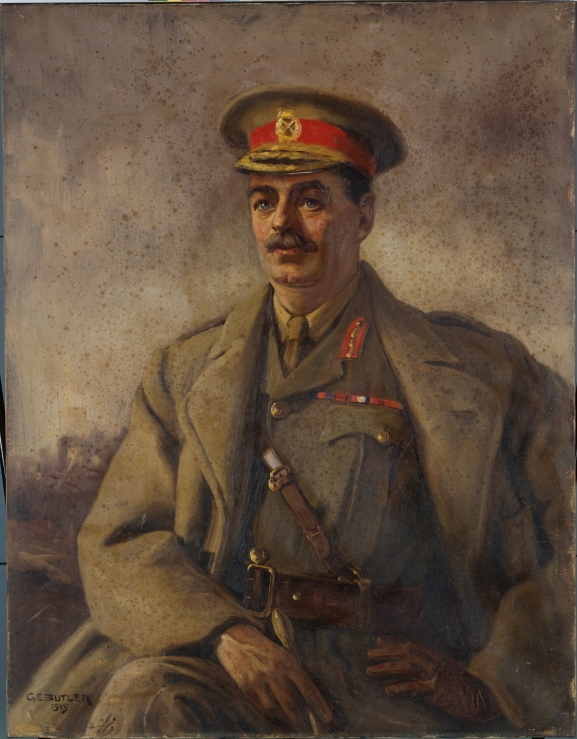
A portrait of Melvill, painted by George Edmund Butler in 1919

After the end of the war, Melvill served as an administrative officer and oversaw the disbandment of the NZEF in 1919. He was discharged from active duty in October 1919. Now in the Reserve Forces, on his return to New Zealand he was made commander of the Wellington Military District which, during a reorganisation of the Territorial Force, became Central Command. In April 1924 he was promoted to major general and appointed Commandant of the New Zealand Military Forces. He had served in this capacity for nearly 18 months when he suddenly died in Wellington on 15 September 1925. His death was announced in the House of Representatives the same day. Survived by his wife, Rita Burnett, whom he had married in 1911, he was buried with full military honours in the servicemen's section of Wellington's Karori Cemetery.

== Notes ==
Military offices
Preceded by Major General Edward Chaytor	Commandant of New Zealand Military Forces; May 1924 – September 1925	Succeeded by Major General Robert Young
