= Teignmouth Melvill =

Recipient of the Victoria Cross

Lieutenant Teignmouth Melvill VC
- Photo of Melvill, c. 1877
- Born: 8 September 1842; Marylebone, London
- Died: 22 January 1879 (aged 36); Buffalo River, South Africa
- Burial place: Fugitive's Drift, below Itchiane Hill
- Relatives: Charles Melvill (son); Philip Sandys Melvill (brother)
- Military career
- Allegiance: United Kingdom
- Branch: British Army
- Service years: 1865–1879 †
- Rank: Lieutenant
- Units: 24th Regiment of Foot
- Conflicts: Anglo-Zulu War: Battle of Isandhlwana
- Awards: Victoria Cross

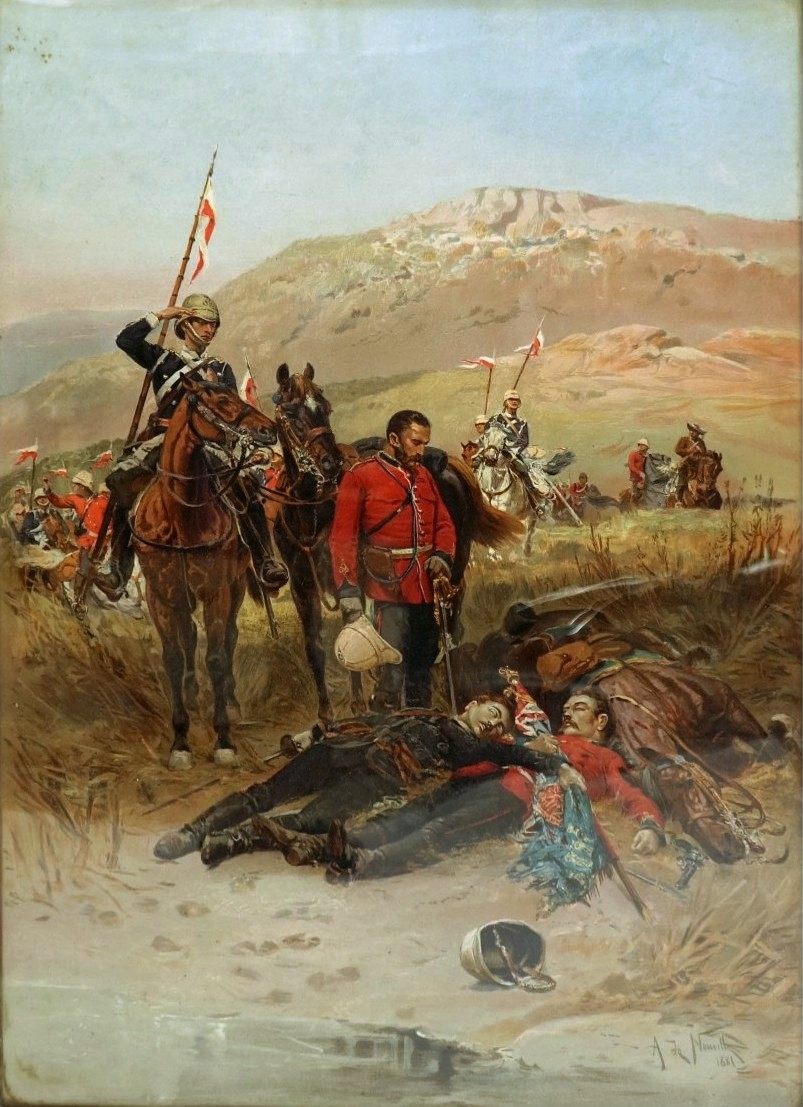
Discovery of the bodies of Lieutenant Melvill and Lieutenant Coghill

Lieutenant Teignmouth Melvill VC (8 September 1842 – 22 January 1879) was an English officer in the British Army and recipient of the Victoria Cross, the highest and most prestigious award for gallantry in the face of the enemy that can be awarded to British and Commonwealth forces.

== Details ==
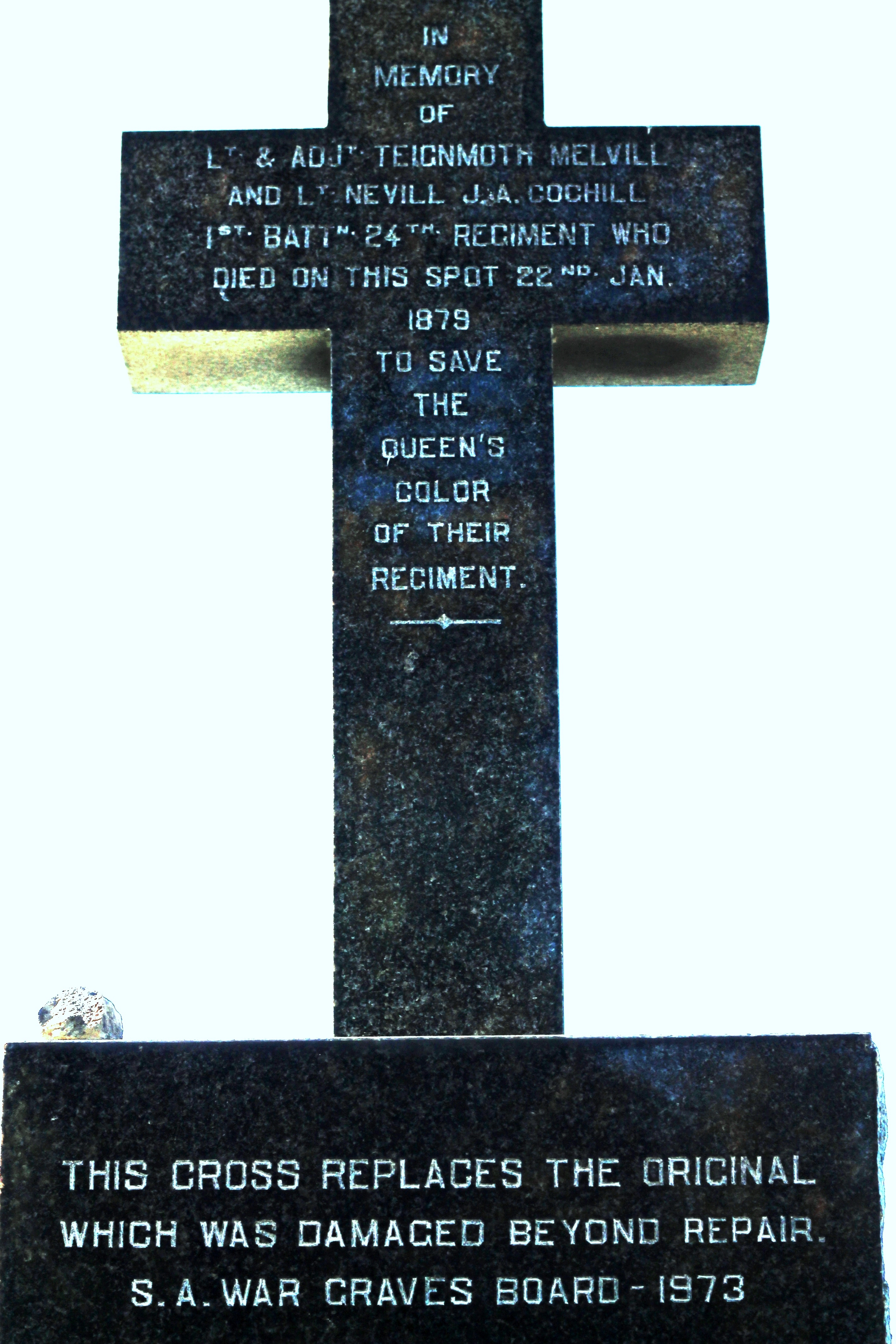
Memorial to Mellvill and Coghill

The son of Philip Melvill, he was educated at Harrow School, Cheltenham School and Trinity College, Cambridge. He was a contributor to Baily's Magazine of Sports & Pastimes under the name 'Green Facings.'

He was 36 years old, and a lieutenant in the 1st Battalion, 24th Regiment of Foot (2nd Warwickshires), British Army during the Anglo-Zulu War when the following deed took place for which he was awarded the VC.

On 22 January 1879 after the disaster of the Battle of Isandhlwana, South Africa, Lieutenant Melvill made efforts to save the Queen's Colour of his regiment. He and Nevill Josiah Aylmer Coghill were pursued by Zulu warriors and after experiencing great difficulty in crossing the swollen Buffalo River, during which time the Colour was lost and carried downstream, the two men were overtaken by the enemy and following a short struggle both were killed. The Colour was retrieved from the river ten days later.

Melvill and Coghill were amongst the first soldiers to receive the VC posthumously in 1907. Initially The London Gazette mentioned that had they survived they would have been awarded the VC.

He was played by James Faulkner in the film Zulu Dawn.

Teignmouth Philip Melvill (1877–1951) polo player, and Charles Melvill (1878–1925) a major general, were his sons.

== The medal ==
His Victoria Cross is displayed at the Regimental Museum of The Royal Welsh in Brecon, Powys, Wales.
