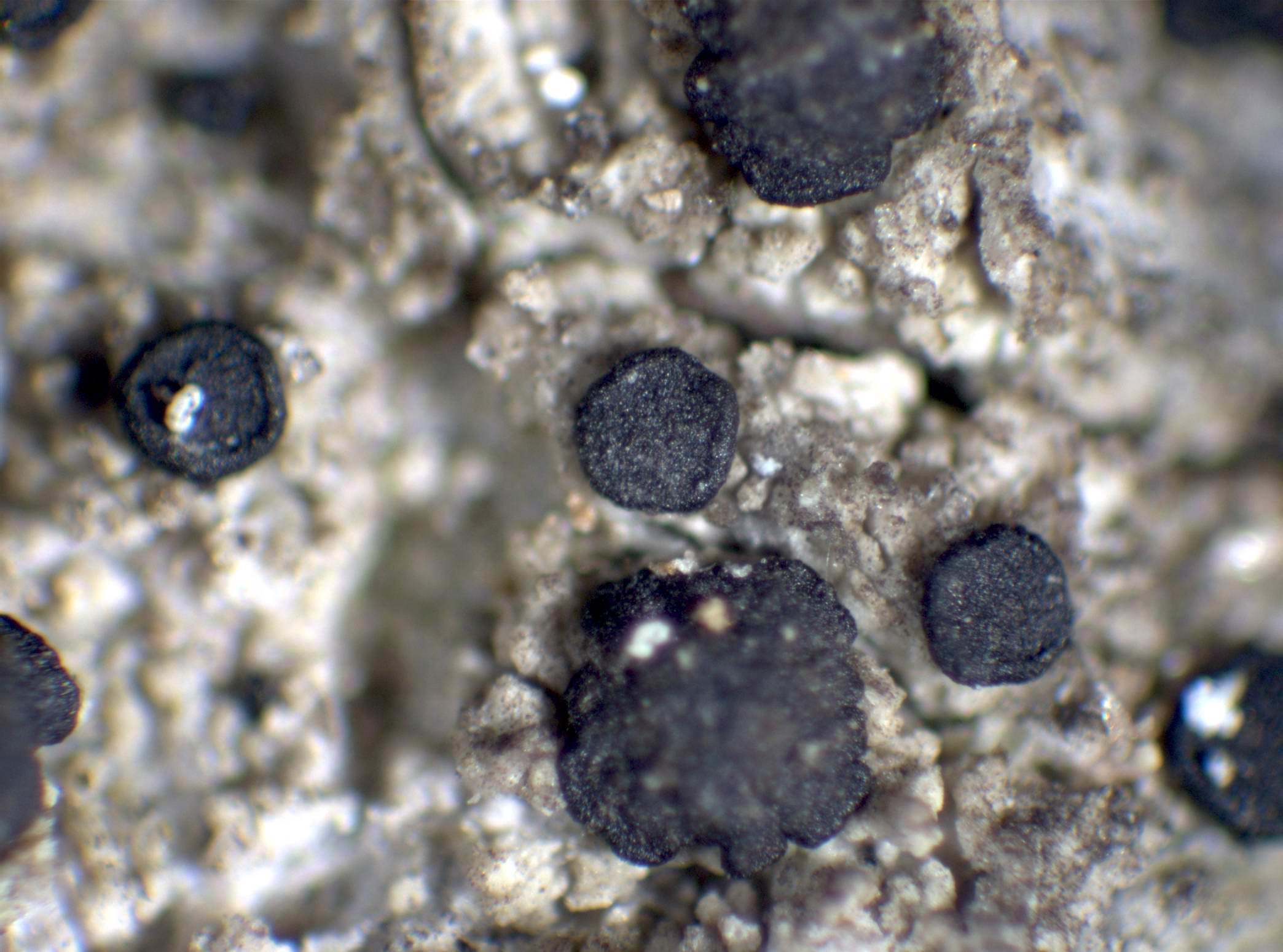

Scientific classification
- Domain: Eukaryota
- Kingdom: Fungi
- Division: Ascomycota
- Class: Lecanoromycetes
- Order: Lecanorales
- Family: Ramalinaceae
- Genus: Bellicidia; Kistenich, Timdal, Bendiksby & S.Ekman (2018)
- Species: B. incompta

Binomial name
- Bellicidia incompta (Borrer) Kistenich, Timdal, Bendiksby & S.Ekman (2018)

Synonyms
- List: Lecidea incompta Borrer (1834); Biatora effusa var. incompta (Borrer) Fr. (1845); Biatora vernalis var. incompta (Borrer) Fr. (1845); Lecidea luteola var. incompta (Borrer) Nyl. (1857); Bacidia incompta (Borrer) Anzi (1860); Lecidea bacillifera f. incompta (Borrer) Nyl. (1861); Lecidea umbrina f. incompta (Borrer) Nyl. (1861); Secoliga atrosanguinea var. incompta (Borrer) Stizenb. (1863); Lecidea bacillifera var. incompta (Borrer) Nyl. (1866); Biatora rubella var. incompta (Borrer) Tuck. (1868); Bacidia bacillifera var. incompta (Borrer) Branth & Rostr. (1869); Biatora luteola var. incompta (Borrer) Tuck. (1872); Lecidea subincompta * incompta (Borrer) Stizenb. (1882); Biatora rubella subsp. incompta (Borrer) Tuck. (1888); Lecidea incompta var. spissa Shirley (1889); Bacidia incompta var. spissa (Shirley) Zahlbr. (1926); Lecidea subincompta Nyl. (1865)

= Bellicidia =

Single-species lichen genus

Bellicidia is a fungal genus in the family Ramalinaceae. It comprises the single species Bellicidia incompta, a widely distributed corticolous (bark-dwelling) crustose lichen.

== Taxonomy ==
Bellicidia incompta was first formally described as a new species in 1834 by the English botanist William Borrer, who classified it in the genus Lecidea. Martino Anzi transferred the taxon to the genus Bacidia in 1860, and it was largely known as Bacidia incompta in its taxonomic history, although several other authors in the 1800s were reluctant to consider it a unique species, and thought it was more appropriately classed as a subspecies, variety or form of other species.

The name Lecidea subincompta, previously considered a separate species, was determined to be a synonym of B. incompta based on examination of type material.

Bellicidia was segregated from the genus Bacidia based on molecular phylogenetics analysis, which showed that Bacidia incompta occupied a distinct evolutionary lineage that had a sister relationship to the rest of the Toninia clade within the Ramalinaceae. The generic name combines the Latin word bellus meaning "pretty" with the ending -cidia from its former placement in Bacidia. This was meant to balance the somewhat disparaging specific epithet incompta which means "plain" or "unadorned".

== Description ==
Bellicidia has a coarsely granular, grey-green to grass-green or brown-green crustose thallus without a prothallus. The upper cortex consists of a "false cortex" (pseudocortex) and lacks a lower cortex. The photobiont is a unicellular green alga.

The apothecia (fruiting bodies) of Bellicidia are black, mostly flat but sometimes becoming convex, with a distinct shiny margin and often irregular shape. Both the proper exciple and hypothecium contain a dark red-brown pigment that turns purplish in potassium hydroxide solution (K+ purplish). The hymenium is colourless or has a faint red-brown pigment below, with young asci often surrounded by a gelatinous cap containing red-brown pigment.

The asci are club-shaped (clavate) and contain eight spores. These ascospores are bacilliform (rod-shaped), straight or slightly curved, 15–30 μm long and 1.5–2 μm wide, with 1–5 (usually 3) thin septa (internal partitions). This combination of bacilliform ascospores and distinctive red-brown pigmentation helps distinguish Bellicidia from other genera in the Toninia group.

The pycnidia (structures that produce asexual spores) are black, more or less immersed in the thallus, up to about 0.2 mm wide, with dark red-brown walls that react purplish with K. The conidia (asexual spores) are more or less ellipsoid, 5–9 μm long and 2–2.5 μm wide, non-septate or sometimes with a single septum.

== Habitat and distribution ==
Bellicidia incompta grows on bark in humid temperate forests. It prefers basic (pH) bark, particularly Ulmus (elm), although it has been recorded on trees from several genera, including Acer (maple), Aesculus (buckeye), Carpinus (hormbeam), Fraxinus (ash), Fagus (beech), and Ilex (holly). The lichen is widely distributed, having been recorded in Asia, Africa, Australia, Europe, and Macaronesia. Records from North America are considered dubious.
