= Philip Melvill (East India Company officer) =

British Bengal Army officer (1795–1882)

- Born: 26 October 1795; Topsham, Devon, England
- Died: 4 October 1882 (aged 86); Lostwithiel, Cornwall
- Military career
- Allegiance: United Kingdom
- Branch: Bengal Army

Philip Melvill (26 October 1795 – 4 October 1882) was a British Bengal Army officer who went on to be Military Secretary to the East India Company.

== Military career ==
Born the fourth son of Captain Philip Melvill, Melvill was commissioned into the Bengal Army in 1815. His elder brothers included Sir James Cosmo Melvill and Henry Melvill. Sir Philip Melvill was his younger brother.

He was appointed Military Secretary to the East India Company in 1837 remaining there until 1858.

He retired when the East India Company was nationalized in 1857 to Ethy near Lostwithiel in Cornwall where he died.

== Family ==
Melvill's eldest son, Philip Sandys Melvill, became Agent to the Viceroy and Governor-General of India at Baroda. His younger son, Teignmouth Melvill, won the Victoria Cross during the Anglo-Zulu War.

Military offices
Preceded by James Salmond	Military Secretary to the East India Company; 1837–1858	Succeeded by Sir William Baker
