= Philip Melvill =

Scottish philanthropist

Philip Melvill (7 April 1762 – 27 October 1811) was a Scottish philanthropist and patriarch of the Melvill family of Falmouth, Cornwall.

He was born in 1762 in Dunbar, in East Lothian on the southeast coast of Scotland.

== Military service ==
Melvill served in India, as a lieutenant in the 73rd regiment in the war against Hyder Ali's forces. In 1780, he was wounded and captured. He was held prisoner for four years under bad conditions. On his release, he was promoted to captain. However, he was still very ill and stayed with his brother in Bengal until 1786, when he was much recovered.

On his return to England in 1797, he was appointed the commander of an invalid company based on Guernsey, where he married Elizabeth Dobrée. He set up a school for the children of soldiers in his command.

He was then appointed Lieutenant-Governor of Pendennis Castle and served until 1811. He formed the Pendennis Volunteer Artillery, a local militia.

== Marriage and family ==
Melvill married Elizabeth Carey Dobrée (1770–1845), youngest daughter of Peter Dobrée of Beauregarde, Guernsey, and Rachel Bonamy. They had nine children:

- Lt. John Fall Melvill (26 April 1789 – 11 July 1808), drowned, aged 19, off Madeira, in 1808
- Peter Bonamy Melvill (29 December 1790 – 12 April 1803), died young
- Sir James Cosmo Melvill (1792–1861), secretary of the East India Company
- Jean Bonamy Melvill (29 April 1794 – 10 May 1862), died unmarried; resided with her sister Elizabeth through 1853 and then her sister Rachel
- Philip Melvill (1796–1882), Military Secretary to the East India Company in 1837; married in 1831 Eliza Sandys (1805–1890), daughter of Lt.-Col. William Sandys
- Rev. Canon Henry Melvill (1798–1871), Church of England clergyman, principal of the East India Company College, Haileybury; canon residentiary of St Paul's Cathedral; rector of Barnes; married in 1831 Margaret Jennings (1805–1876)
- Rachel Dobrée Melvill (4 August 1800 – 17 April 1885) married in 1829 Henry Kemble, M.P.
- Major General Sir Peter Melvill Melvill KCB (1803–1895), military and naval secretary to the government of Bombay; married in 1836 Catherine Robertson (died 1881)
- Elizabeth Carey Melvill (20 December 1807 – 18 October 1853), died unmarried; resided with her sister, Jean

== Philanthropy ==
In 1807, Melvill founded the Falmouth Misericordia Society "for the relief of poor strangers and distressed persons of the town". He also helped found a Church Girls' School in 1802 and a Boys' School in 1805.

== Death and legacy ==
Melvill died on 27 October 1811 at Pendennis Castle. Memoirs of him were published in 1812.

The Falmouth Misericordia Society was still in operation in 1887.

Melvill Road, connecting the A39 road with Falmouth Docks, is named after him.
