= John James Napier =

English painter

- Born: 1831; London
- Died: 20 March 1877 (aged 45)
- Resting place: Highgate Cemetery
- Spouse: Janet Parker Langmuir

John James Napier (1831-1877) was a Victorian portrait painter active in London between 1856 and 1876.

== Biography ==
John James Napier was a Victorian portrait painter active in London between 1856 and 1876. During that period he exhibited at the Royal Academy and the British Institution.

He married Janet Parker Vance Langmuir on 2 April 1858 in Glasgow and they had two children, Janet and James. His wife died on 26 May 1862, aged 29.

Napier died on 20 March 1877 and he is buried with his son James on the west side of Highgate Cemetery.

== Gallery ==
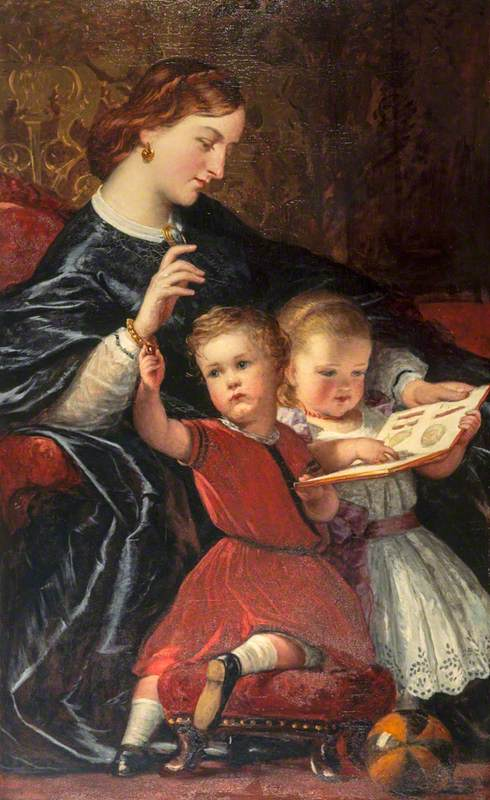
The First Lesson, the Artist's Wife, Janet Parker Vance Langmuir with their Children, Janet and James - National Galleries of Scotland

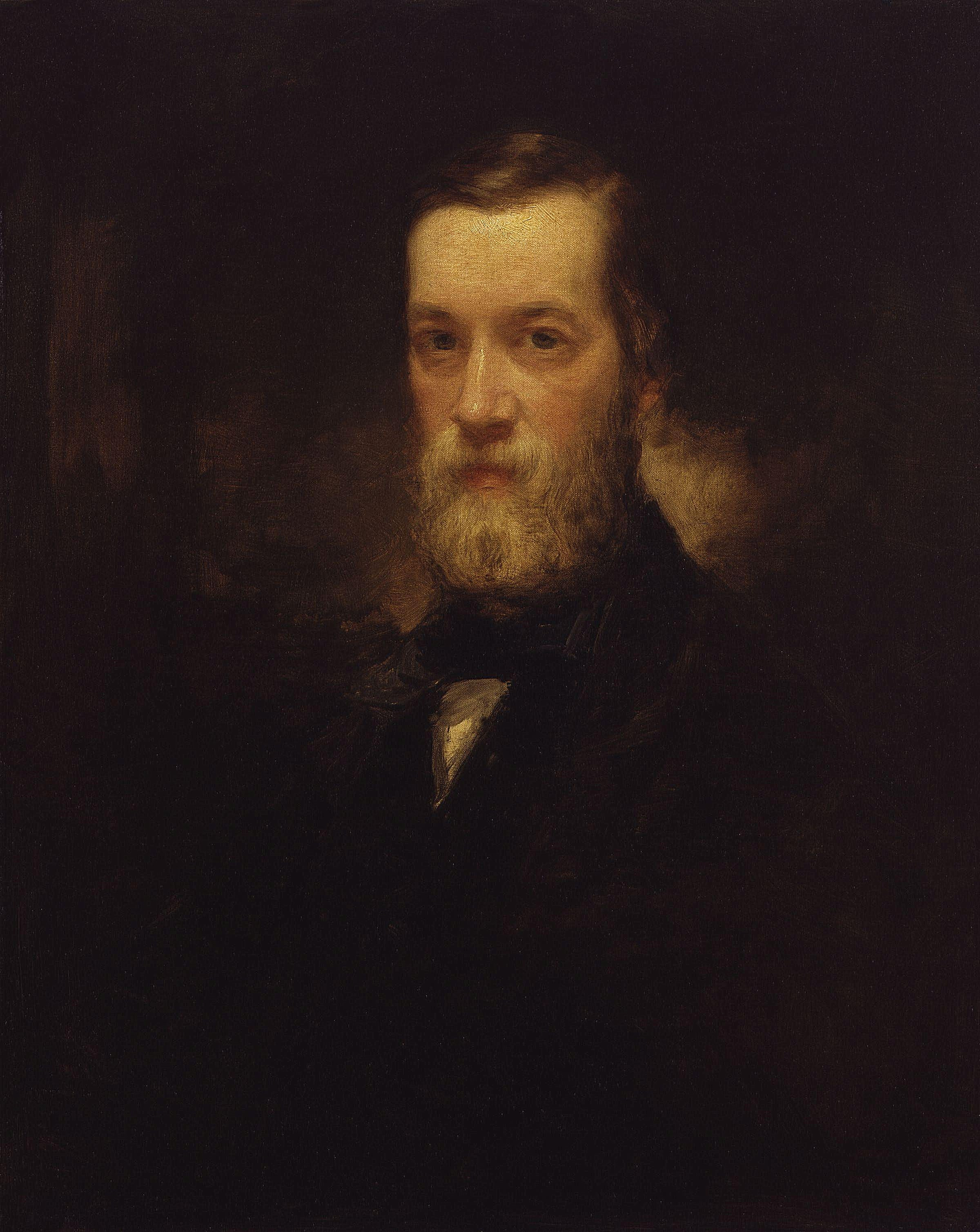
Sir John Robinson

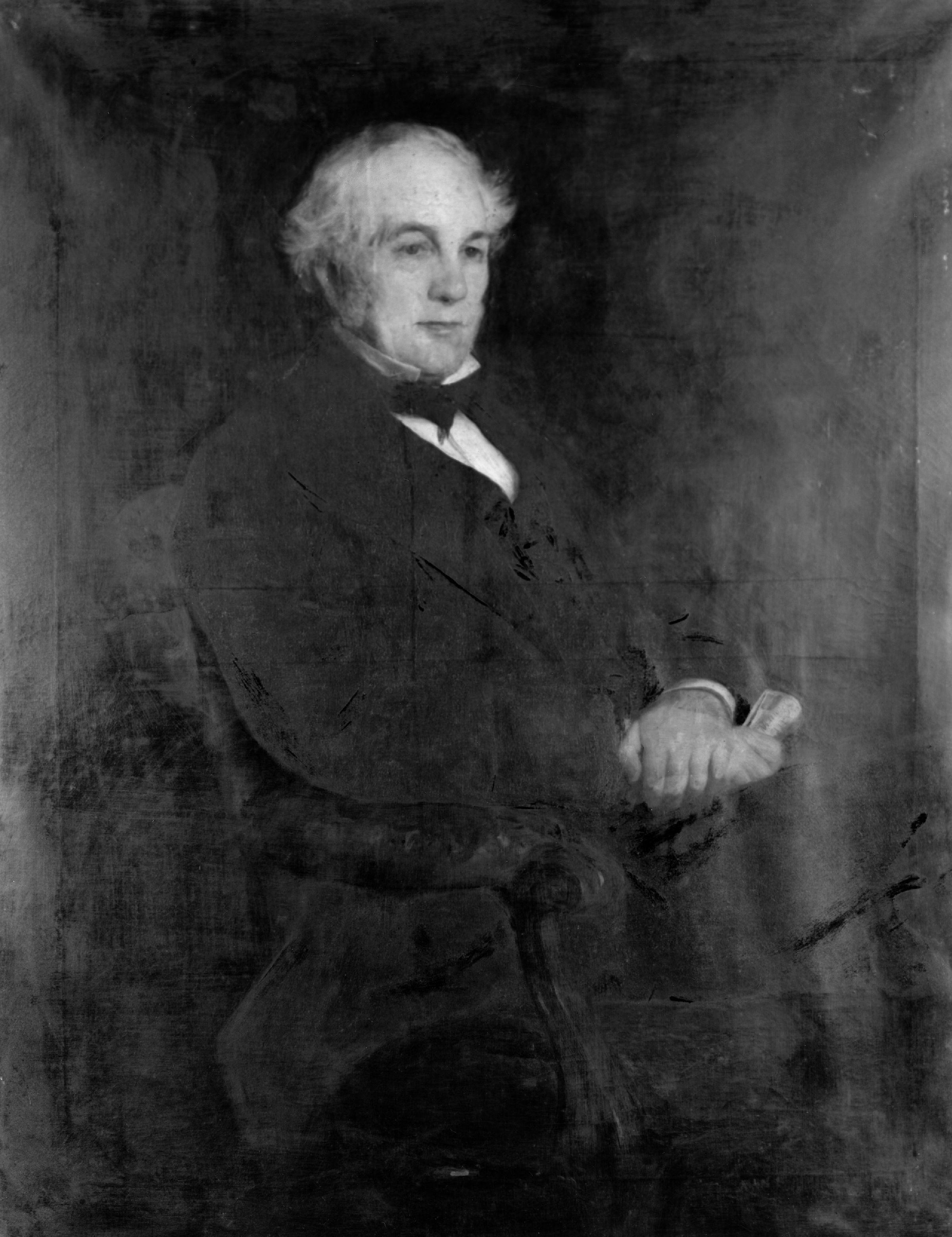
Sir James Cosmo Melvill

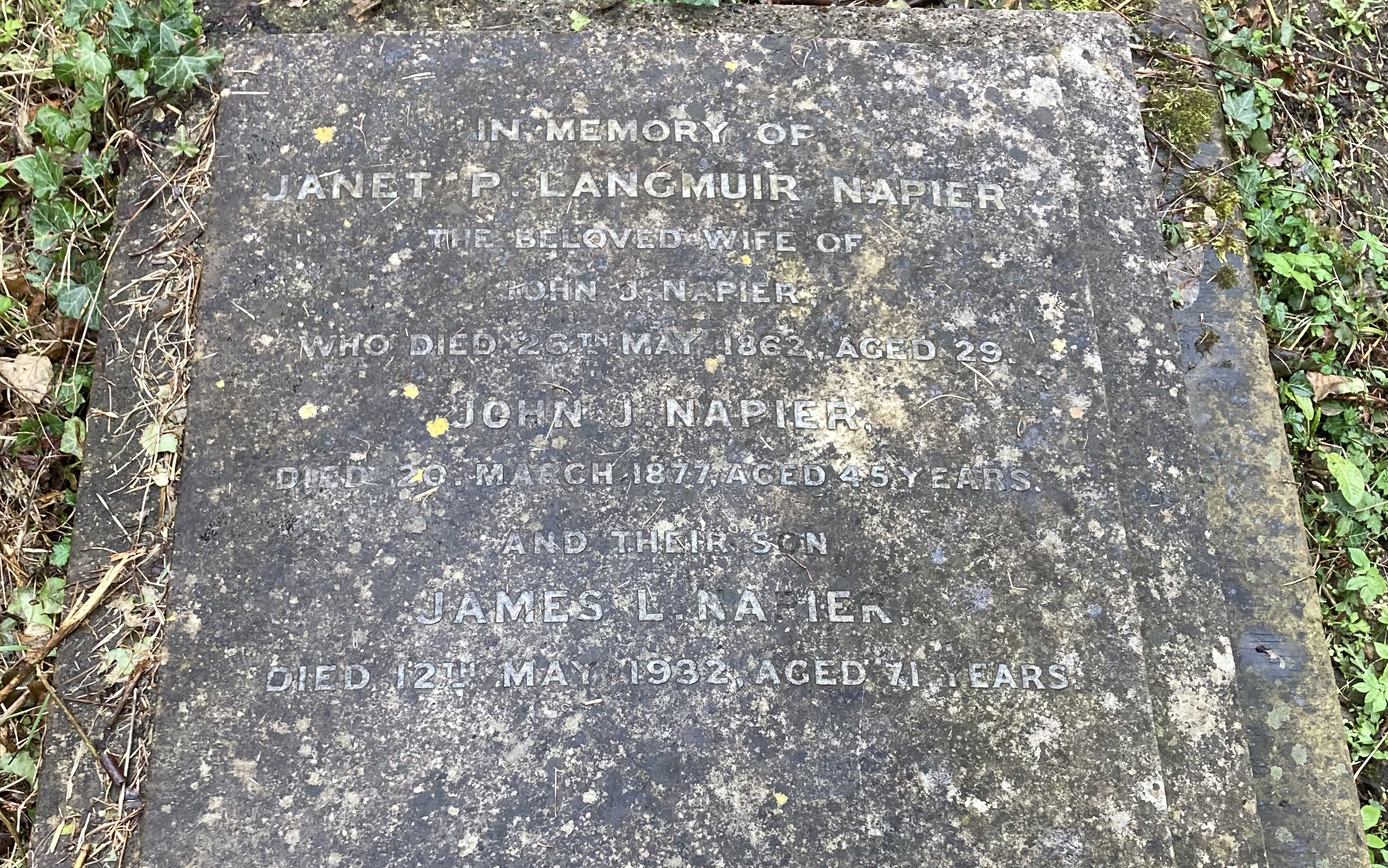
Grave of John James Napier in Highgate Cemetery
