= Henry Melvill =

British priest

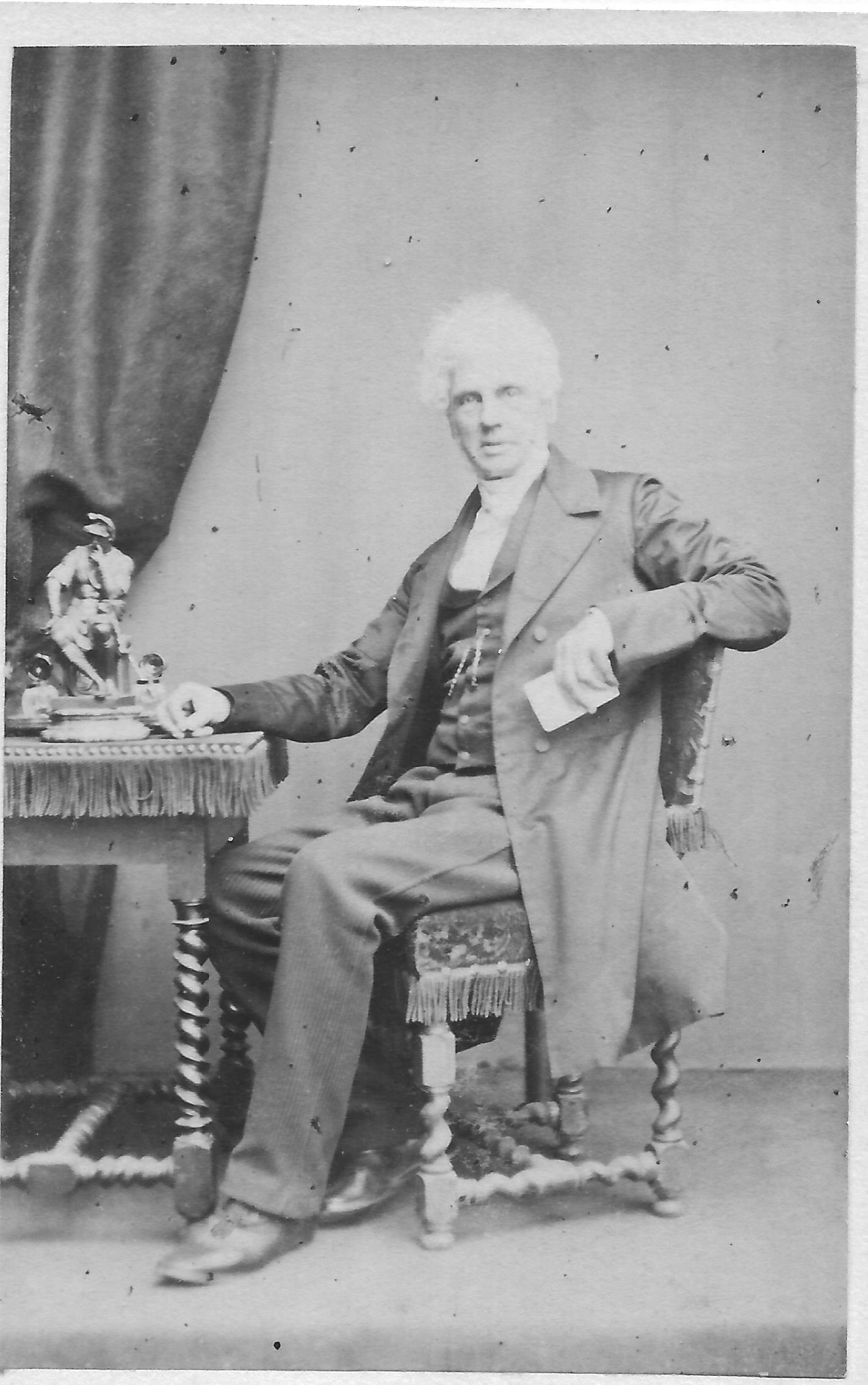
Rev. Henry Melvill, carte de visite c. 1860

Rev. Henry Melvill (14 September 1798 – 9 February 1871) was a British priest in the Church of England, and principal of the East India Company College from 1844 to 1858. He afterwards served as Canon of St Paul's Cathedral.

== Early years ==
Melvill was the fifth son of Philip Melvill (1762–1811), an officer in the army, who was lieutenant-governor of Pendennis Castle from 1797 till 1811, by his wife Elizabeth Carey (1770–1844), daughter of Peter Dobrée of Beauregard, Guernsey. He was born at the castle in 1798. His elder brother was Sir James Cosmo Melvill; Philip Melvill and Sir Peter Melvill were his younger brothers. He was born in Pendennis Castle, Cornwall, on 14 September 1798 and became a sizar of St. John's College, Cambridge, in October 1817. After migrating to Peterhouse, he passed as second wrangler and won the Smith's Prize in 1821, and was a fellow and tutor of his college from 1822 to 1832. He graduated B.A. 1821, M.A. 1824, and B.D. 1836.

== Life as a priest ==
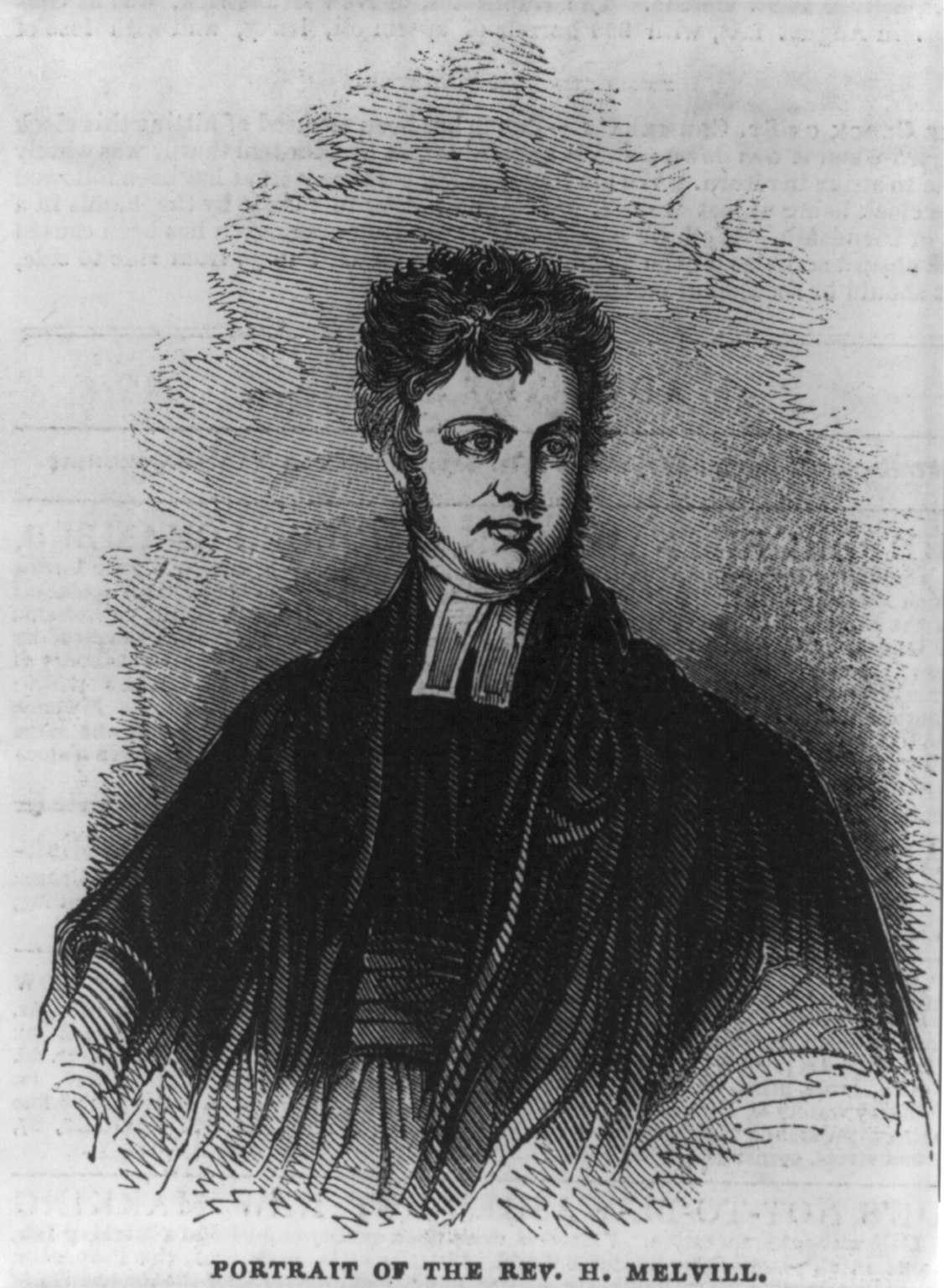
Henry Melvill, 1789-1871

From 1829 to 1843 he served as incumbent of Camden Chapel, Camberwell, London; was appointed by the Duke of Wellington chaplain to the Tower of London in 1840. He was principal of the East India Company College, Haileybury, from 1844 until the college was closed in January 1858; Golden lecturer at St. Margaret's, Lothbury, 1850–1856; one of the chaplains to Queen Victoria, 13 June 1853; canon residentiary of St. Paul's, 21 April 1856; and rector of Barnes, Surrey, 1863–71. Melvill for many years had the reputation of being "the most popular preacher in London", and one of the greatest rhetoricians of his time. First at Camden Chapel, then at St. Margaret's, and later on at St. Paul's, large crowds of people attended his ministrations. His sermon generally occupied three-quarters of an hour, but such was the rapidity of his utterance that he spoke as much in that time as an ordinary preacher would have done in an hour. His delivery was earnest and animated without distinctive gesticulation; his voice was clear and flexible; while his emphatic pronunciation and his hurried manner of speaking impressed the hearers with a conviction of his sincerity. But his sermons lacked simplicity and directness of style, and his ornate phraseology, his happy analogies, smoothly balanced sentences, appealed more directly to the literary than to the spiritual sense. His views were evangelical.

== Personal life ==
In 1830, Melvill married Margaret Alice Jennings. They had nine children:

- Clara Melvill (1831–1900), married Stewart St. John Gordon
- Lt.-Gen. Henry Melvill (1832–1908), Bengal Cavalry
- Sir Maxwell Melvill KCIE (1833–1887), Judge of the High Court, Bombay
- Richard Gwatkin Melvill (1835–1920), Bengal Civil Service, married in 1858 (later divorced) Gertrude Margaret Van Cortlandt (Henry Charles Van Cortlandt, natural son of Henry Clinton Van Cortlandt and grandson of Philip Van Cortlandt), with whom he had six children; married secondly in 1885 to Emily Matthias
- Francis Dawes Melvill (1836–1881), Bombay Civil Service; married Mary Louisa "Minnie" Hayes, daughter of Judge Edmund Bradshaw Hayes
- Margaret Stone Melvill (1837–1893), married Thomas Borron Myers
- Elizabeth Cooke Melvill (1839–1929), married Clement Walsh Bagshawe
- Isabella Melvill (1843–1920), married Douglas Close Richmond
- Edith Melvill (1845–1865), married 6 October 1864 to Clement Alexander Middleton of the Bombay Civil Service. She died of dysentry at Hydrabad on 3 September 1865.

He died at the residentiary house, Amen Corner, London, 9 February 1871, and was buried in St. Paul's Cathedral on 15 February.

Margaret Alice Melvill died at Knowle in Devon on 18 April 1878, aged 73.

== Selected works ==
- Sermons, 1833–8 2 vols., 6th edit. 1870.
- Sermons preached before the University of Cambridge to which are added two sermons preached in Great St. Mary's, 1836, five editions.
- Four Sermons preached before the University of Cambridge, 1837, five editions.
- Four Sermons preached before the University of Cambridge 1839, three editions.
- Sermons preached at Cambridge 1840.
- Sermons on certain of the less prominent Facts and References in Sacred Story 1843–5, 2 vols., new edit. 1872.
- Sermons preached on Public Occasions 1846.
- The Preacher in Print, The Golden Lectures, Forty-eight Sermons delivered at St. Margaret's Church, Lothbury 1850 (published without Melvill's sanction).
- Thoughts appropriate to the Season and the Days: Lectures delivered at St. Margaret's, Lothbury 1851.
- A Selection from the Lectures delivered at St. Margaret's, Lothbury 1853.
- The Golden Lectures for the Years 1850 to 1855 inclusive 1856, 6 vols.
- Selections from the Sermons preached in the Parish Church of Barnes, and in the Cathedral of St. Paul's 1872, 2 vols.
