= 1838 Coronation Honours =

British government recognitions

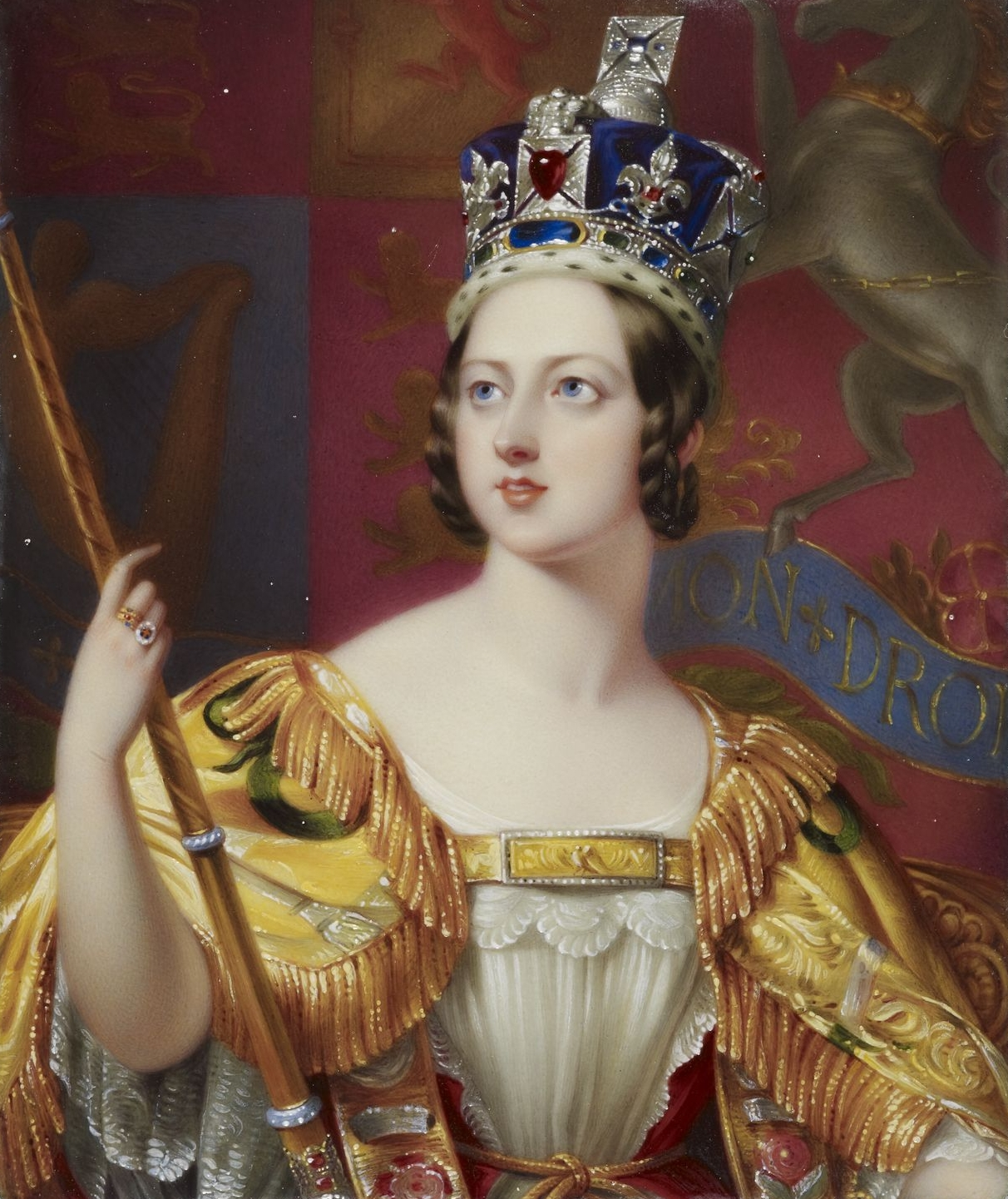
Coronation portrait of Queen Victoria

The 1838 Coronation Honours were appointments by Queen Victoria to various orders and honours on the occasion of her coronation on 28 June 1838. The honours were published in The London Gazette on 20 July and 24 July 1838.

The recipients of honours are displayed here as they were styled before their new honour, and arranged by honour, with classes (Knight, Knight Grand Cross, etc.) and then divisions (Military, Civil, etc.) as appropriate.

== United Kingdom and British Empire ==
=== Knight Bachelor ===
- Major Edward Alexander Campbell CB of the Bengal Cavalry
- Duncan MacDougall, late Lieutenant-Colonel of the 79th Regiment of Highlanders, Knight Commander of the Royal and Military Order of St. Ferdinand
- Major-General Jeffrey Prendergast, of the Honourable East India Company's Service
- Major Henry Bayly, Knight of the Royal Hanoverian Guelphic Order
- Major William Lloyd, of the Honourable East India Company's Service
- Charles Shaw, Knight Commander of the Royal Portuguese Military Order of the Tower and Sword, and Knight Commander of the Spanish Military Order of San Fernando
- Charles Frederick Williams, of Lennox lodge, Hayling, Hants., and Upper Bedford-place, in the county of Middlesex
- Edward Johnson, of Greenhill, Weymouth, in the county of Dorset, of the Royal and Distinguished Order of Charles the Third of Spain
- John Kirkland, of Hampton and Pall-mall, in the county of Middlesex
- William Newbigging FRCS of Edinburgh
- William Hyde Pearson FRS of Clapham, in the county of Surrey

=== The Most Honourable Order of the Bath ===
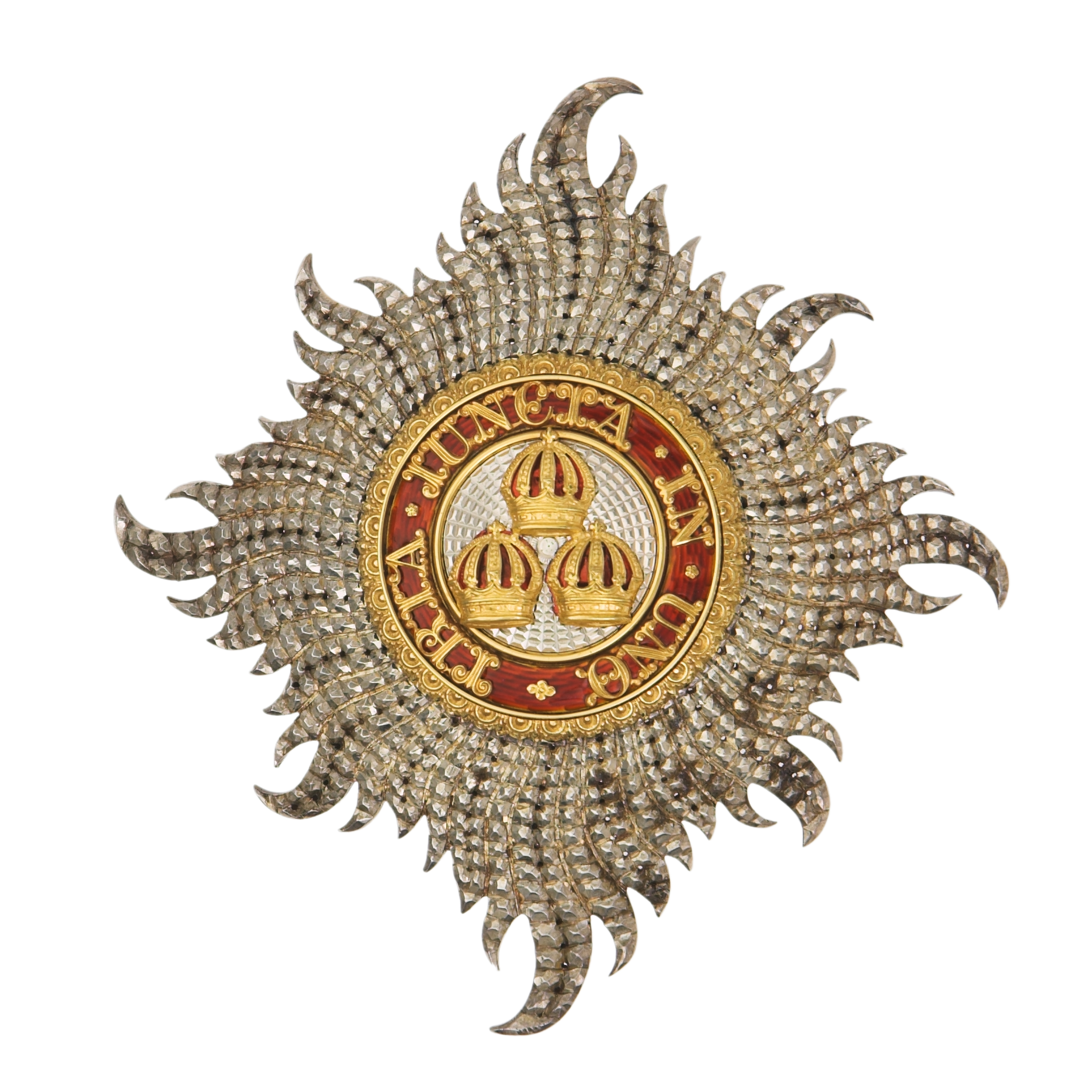
Civilian star of the Knight Grand Cross of the Order of the Bath

==== Knight Grand Cross of the Order of the Bath (GCB) ====
===== Military Division =====
- Admiral Sir William Sidney Smith KCB
- Lieutenant-General Sir John Lambert KCB
- Lieutenant-General the Honourable Sir Robert William O'Callaghan KCB
- Major-General Sir Alexander Dickson KCB
- Major-General Sir Alexander Caldwell KCB of the Bengal Army and East India Company
- Major-General Sir James Law Lushington KCB of the Madras Army and East India Company

===== Civil Division =====
- Archibald, Earl of Gosford
- Lord George William Russell, Her Majesty's Envoy Extraordinary and Minister Plenipotentiary to His Majesty the King of Prussia
- Charles Augustus Lord Howard de Walden, Her Majesty's Envoy Extraordinary and Minister Plenipotentiary to Her Most Faithful Majesty
- Richard Jenkins, of the East India Company's Civil Service

==== Knight Commander of the Order of the Bath (KCB) ====
===== Military Division =====
Royal Navy

- Admiral John Lawford
- Rear-Admiral Sir John Acworth Ommanney CB

Army

- Major-General Andrew Pilkington CB
- Major-General John Gardiner CB
- Major-General Sir Arthur Benjamin Clifton CB
- Major-General Lord Greenock CB
- Major-General Sir Willoughby Cotton CB
- Major-General Sir John George Woodford CB
- Major-General Sir Patrick Lindesay CB
- Major-General Charles James Napier CB
- Major-General Sir Evan John Murray MacGregor Bt CB
- Major-General Edward Gibbs CB
- Major-General George Thomas Napier CB
- Major-General the Honourable Hercules R. Pakenham CB
- Major-General Sir John Thomas Jones Bt CB
- Major-General Sir John Harvey CB
- Major-General Sir Leonard Greenwell CB
- Major-General Sir Robert Henry Dick CB
- Major-General Sir Neil Douglas CB
- Major-General Alexander Cameron CB
- Major-General John Fox Burgoyne CB

East India Company

- Major-General John Rose CB of the Bengal Infantry
- Major-General Thomas Corsellis CB of the Bombay Infantry
- Major-General William Richards CB of the Bengal Infantry
- Major-General Thomas Whitehead CB of the Bengal Infantry
- Major-General John Doveton CB of the Madras Cavalry
- Major-General David Foulis CB of the Madras Cavalry
- Major-General Sir Thomas Anburey Kt CB of the Bengal Engineers

==== Companion of the Order of the Bath (CB) ====
===== Military Division =====
Royal Navy

- Captain Sir Edward Thomas Troubridge Bt
- Captain Cuthbert Featherstone Daly
- Captain Edward Pelham Brenton
- Captain Richard Arthur
- Captain James Andrew Worthy
- Captain Robert Morgan George Festing
- Captain Barrington Reynolds
- Captain Robert Maunsell

Army

- Colonel William Wood, 41st foot
- Colonel William Warre. Unattached
- Colonel George C. D'Aguilar, Unattached, Deputy Adjutant-General in Ireland
- Colonel Henry Sullivan, 6th Foot
- Colonel Stephen A. Goodman, 48th Foot
- Colonel Edward Wynyard, unattached
- Colonel George Brown, Rifle Brigade
- Colonel Charles Edward Conyers, Inspecting Field Officer
- Colonel James Allan, 57th Foot
- Colonel David Forbes, 78th Foot
- Colonel Henry Adolphus Proctor, 6th Foot
- Colonel Edward Parkinson, 11th Foot
- Colonel Thomas Francis Wade, Unattached
- Colonel Richard Egerton, Unattached
- Colonel William Chalmers, 57th Foot
- Colonel Chatham Horace Churchill, 31st Foot, Quartermaster-General in India
- Colonel James Grant, 23d Foot
- Colonel Thomas William Taylor, Lieutenant-Governor, Royal Military College
- Colonel John Morillyon Wilson, 77th Foot
- Colonel Thomas Willshire, 2nd Foot
- Colonel Henry Oglander, 26th Foot
- Colonel Edward Fleming, Inspecting Field Officer
- Colonel Philip Bainbridge, Assistant Quartermaster-General
- Colonel Sempronius Stretton, 84th Foot
- Colonel Thomas E. Napier, Chasseurs Britanniques
- Colonel Nathaniel Thorn, Assistant Quartermaster-General
- Colonel William Henry Sewell, 31st Foot, Deputy Quartermaster-General in India
- Colonel Joseph Thackwell, 3rd Dragoons
- Colonel Alexander Macdonald, Royal Artillery
- Colonel Sir William L. Herries, Unattached
- Colonel Thomas Staunton St. Clair, Unattached
- Colonel George William Paty, 94th Foot
- Colonel Thomas James Wemyss, 99th Foot
- Colonel Robert Burd Gabriel, 2nd Dragoons
- Colonel William Rowan, Unattached
- Colonel James Shaw Kennedy, Unattached
- Colonel George Leigh Goldie, 11th Foot
- Colonel George Couper, Unattached
- Colonel Henry Rainey, Unattached
- Colonel the Honourable Charles Gore, Deputy Quartermaster-General in Canada
- Colonel Griffith George Lewis, Royal Engineers
- Colonel George Judd Harding, Royal Engineers
- Lieutenant-Colonel John Gurwood, Unattached
- Lieutenant-Colonel Walter Frederick O'Reilly, Royal African Corps
- Lieutenant-Colonel Alexander Kennedy Clark, 7th Dragoon Guards
- Lieutenant-Colonel Edward T. Michell, Royal Artillery
- Lieutenant-Colonel Thomas Blanchard, Royal Engineers
- Lieutenant-Colonel Thomas Dyneley, Royal Artillery
- Lieutenant-Colonel William Reid, Royal Engineers
- Lieutenant-Colonel William Bolden Dundas, Royal Artillery
- Lieutenant-Colonel John Neave Wells, Royal Engineers
- Lieutenant-Colonel William Brereton, Royal Artillery
- Lieutenant-Colonel John Owen, Royal Marines
- Lieutenant-Colonel Charles Cornwallis Dansey, Royal Artillery

East India Company

- Colonel William Turner, of the Bombay Cavalry
- Colonel William Hull, of the Bombay Infantry
- Colonel Sir James Limond Kt of the Madras Artillery
- Colonel William Sandwith, of the Bombay Infantry
- Colonel James F. Salter, of the Bombay Infantry
- Colonel Henry George Andrew Taylor, of the Madras Infantry
- Colonel Herbert Bowen, of the Bengal Infantry
- Colonel F. S. T. Johnstone, of the Bengal Cavalry
- Colonel Sir Robert Cunliffe Bt of the Bengal Infantry
- Colonel Peter de la Motte, of the Bombay Cavalry
- Colonel Edward Frederick, of the Bombay Infantry
- Colonel James Kennedy, of the Bengal Cavalry
- Colonel Sir Jeremiah Bryant Kt of the Bengal Infantry
- Colonel Edmund F. Waters, of the Bengal Infantry
- Colonel William S. Whish, of the Bengal Artillery
- Colonel William Battine, of the Bengal Artillery
- Colonel Archibald Galloway, of the Bengal Infantry
- Colonel Lechmere Russell, of the Bombay Artillery
- Colonel Robert Home, of the Madras Infantry
- Lieutenant-Colonel James H. Frith, of the Madras Artillery
- Lieutenant-Colonel Henry Cock, of the Bengal Infantry
- Lieutenant-Colonel Charles Herbert, of the Madras Infantry
- Lieutenant-Colonel John Morgan, of the Madras Infantry
- Lieutenant-Colonel Josiah Stewart, of the Madras Infantry
- Lieutenant-Colonel William Williamson, of the Madras Infantry
- Lieutenant-Colonel Henry Hall, of the Bengal Infantry
- Lieutenant-Colonel John Cheape, of the Bengal Engineers
- Lieutenant-Colonel John Low, of the Madras Infantry
- Lieutenant-Colonel John Colvin, of the Bengal Engineers
- Lieutenant-Colonel Alexander Tulloch, of the Madras Infantry
- Lieutenant-Colonel S. W. Steel, of the Madras Infantry
- Lieutenant-Colonel Joseph Orchard, of the Bengal Infantry
- Lieutenant-Colonel Charles Graham, of the Bengal Artillery
- Major John Herring, of the Bengal Infantry
- Major Edward A. Campbell, of the Bengal Cavalry
- Major P. Montgomerie, of the Madras Artillery
- Major W. J. Butterworth, of the Madras Infantry
- Major John Purton, of the Madras Engineers
- Major John Cameron, of the Madras Infantry
- Major Thomas Lumsden, of the Bengal Artillery
- Major Thomas Timbrell, of the Bengal Artillery
