= The Waterloo Banquet (painting) =

1837 William Salter painting

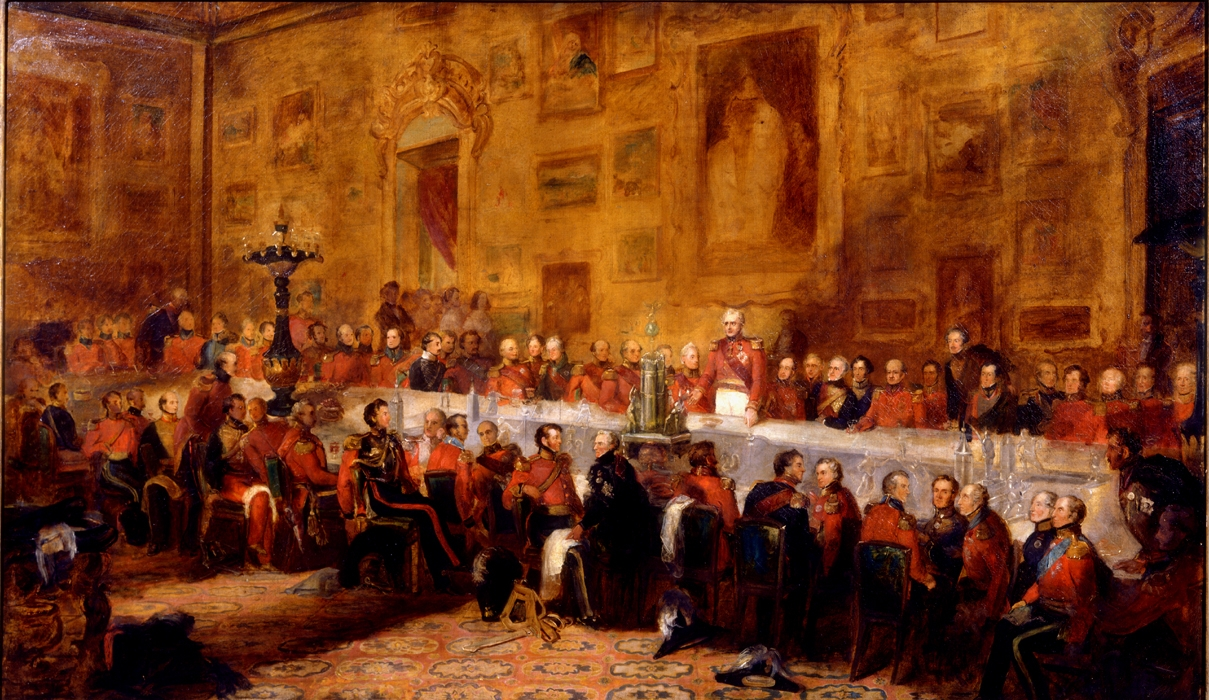
The Waterloo Banquet 1836 by William Salter

The Waterloo Banquet or The Waterloo Banquet 1836 is an 1836-1841 oil on canvas painting now in Apsley House. It is the main work by William Salter and shows an annual banquet organised by the Duke of Wellington on the anniversary of the attendees' victory at the Battle of Waterloo, a tradition that still continues today. It nominally shows the banquet in 1836 but does include some of those who had attended previous banquets but had died before 1836.

== History ==
The story is that Salter was on his horse in Hyde Park on 18 June 1836 when he happened to hear and then see the banquet in progress at the Duke of Wellington's house at Hyde Park Corner. He was so intrigued by the spectacle that he approached his patron with a proposal for a painting to capture the scene. His patron Lady Berghersh consented to approach the Duke with the proposal. The Duke was immediately against the idea as he considered Salter's immaturity would not be up to the complexity of the painting Salter was proposing. Lady Berghersh was the Duke's niece and she and the Duke were close and kept up a correspondence for many years. The Duke was persuaded and he gave Salter access to the room and ornaments so that he could get their likenesses.

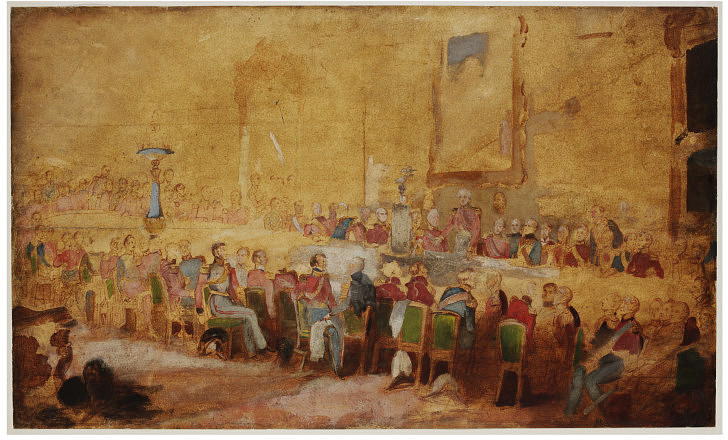
1836 Oil sketch of The Waterloo Banquet 1836 by Salter

Still on display at Apsley House, the 'plateau' or centrepiece on the table is over a metre wide and over eight metres long. It was a present from the government of Portugal and was made from silver that came from melting down coins. The silver and gilt metalwork was designed by Domingos Sequeira and shows the victories of the Napoleonic wars. Salter also included the two massive candelabra presented by Alexander I of Russia (atop the centrepiece at either end), the Waterloo Shield presented by the City of London (far left) and other artworks presented to the Duke such as a copy of Anthony van Dyck's Charles I on Horseback with Monsieur de St Antoine (behind him) and Velazquez's The Waterseller of Seville (between Charles and the group of women).

Salter worked on the painting for five years at his studio in Pall Mall, persevering to obtain a sitting from the invitees. Each of the people in the painting was reported as a good likeness and eighty of the resulting studies are now in the National Portrait Gallery. He chose the moment of the Duke proposing a toast to avoid half the men facing away from the viewer - he instead shows the near side sitting in conversational groups and thus is able to show them all full face or in profile.

The painting was engraved and was very popular, with a key provided to those shown. Tickets were sold to people who wanted to see the painting when it was exhibited in 1841. An 1846 engraving by William Greatbach of the painting also sold well. It was proposed in 1852 to purchase the painting from the artist by public subscription, however this failed to achieve its goal probably due to the Duke's death in September 1852. The painting remained unsold and passed down to Salter's heirs.

== People shown (L-R) ==
* - died before the 1836 banquet

=== Left end of table ===
- Colonel Edward Parkinson, 93rd Highlanders
- Lieutenant General Sir Henry Askew
- Colonel Richard Llewellyn, 28th Regiment of Foot
- Major General James Hay, 17th Lancers (standing)
- Colonel John Fremantle
- Colonel Sir Charles Webb Dance
- Colonel The Honourable George Dawson-Damer

=== Standing against long wall ===
- Colonel George Charles Hoste
- Major General Stephen Galway Adye
- Major General Sir William Maynard Gomm
- Colonel Sempronius Stretton
- Self-portrait of the artist
- Lady Fitzroy Somerset (niece of Wellington)
- Miss Catherine Somerset
- Jane Fane, Countess of Westmorland
- Miss Somerset
- Paolo Ruffo di Bagnara, Prince of Castelcicala, Neapolitan ambassador
- The Duke of Wellington
- Colonel Charles King, 11th and 16th Lancers
- Major General Henry Wyndham (as Colonel of the 10th Hussars)
- Colonel Sampson Stawell, 17th Lancers
- Major General Sir James Macdonell
- William Greatbach
- Colonel Reginald Ragnald Macdonnald
- Colonel Henry Dawkins

=== Far side of table ===
- Colonel Horatio Townshend
- Colonel James Grant, 18th Hussars
- Major General Sir Henry Willoughby Rooke, 3rd Foot Guards
- Colonel John Reeve, 1st Foot Guards
- Lieutenant General Sir John Vandeleur
- Major General George O'Malley
- Major General Sir Joseph Straton
- Colonel Lord Hotham
- Lieutenant General Sir Thomas Reynell
- Major General Henry Murray
- Major General Henry D'Oyly
- Major General Sir Edward Kerrison
- Lieutenant General Sir John Lambert
- Lieutenant General Sir Colin Halkett
- Major General Sir Alexander Dickson
- Lieutenant General Lord Strafford
- General Lord Hill
- Lieutenant Colonel Lord Bathurst *
- King William IV
- William, King of the Netherlands
- Carlo Andrea Pozzo di Borgo, Russian ambassador
- General Henry Paget, 1st Marquess of Anglesey
- Charles Lennox, 4th Duke of Richmond
- Lieutenant General Sir Arthur Clifton
- Lieutenant General Sir Edward Somerset
- Major General Sir Robert Henry Dick, as Colonel of 42nd Highlanders
- General Miguel Ricardo de Álava, Spanish ambassador
- Lieutenant General Lord Fitzroy Somerset
- Colonel Richard Egerton
- Major General Sir Edward Bowater
- Major General Sir George Scovell

=== Near side of table ===
- Colonel Edward Parkinson
- Colonel Thomas Hunter-Blair
- Colonel Lord Robert Manners
- Major General Douglas Mercer-Henderson
- Major General James Wallace Sleigh, 9th Lancers
- Colonel Felix Calvert
- Major General Sir John May
- Colonel Charles Allix, 1st Foot Guards
- Colonel Thomas William Taylor
- Major General William George Keith Elphinstone
- Lieutenant Colonel Sir Robert Gardiner
- Lieutenant General Sir Frederick Adam
- Major General The Honourable Edward Pyndar Lygon
- Lieutenant Colonel Charles Rowan
- Major General Lord Harris
- Lieutenant General Sir James Kempt
- Lieutenant Colonel Lord Sandys, Scots Greys
- Lieutenant General Sir Andrew Barnard
- Lieutenant General Sir Colin Campbell
- Lieutenant General Sir John Elley
- Lieutenant General Lord Vivian
- Lieutenant General The Right Honourable Henry Hardinge
- Major General Sir Charles Broke Vere
- Colonel John Gurwood, the Duke's secretary
- Major General Sir John Waters
- Major General Clement Delves Hill
- Major General Lord Saltoun
- Lieutenant General Sir Peregrine Maitland
- Lieutenant Colonel Lord John Somerset, Fitzroy and Edward Somerset's brother
- Lieutenant Colonel Berkeley Drummond
- Lieutenant General Sir Edward Barnes

=== Right end of table ===
- Colonel Sir Hew Dalrymple Ross
