= Edward Parkinson =

British Army general (died 1858)

Lieutenant-General Edward Parkinson CB
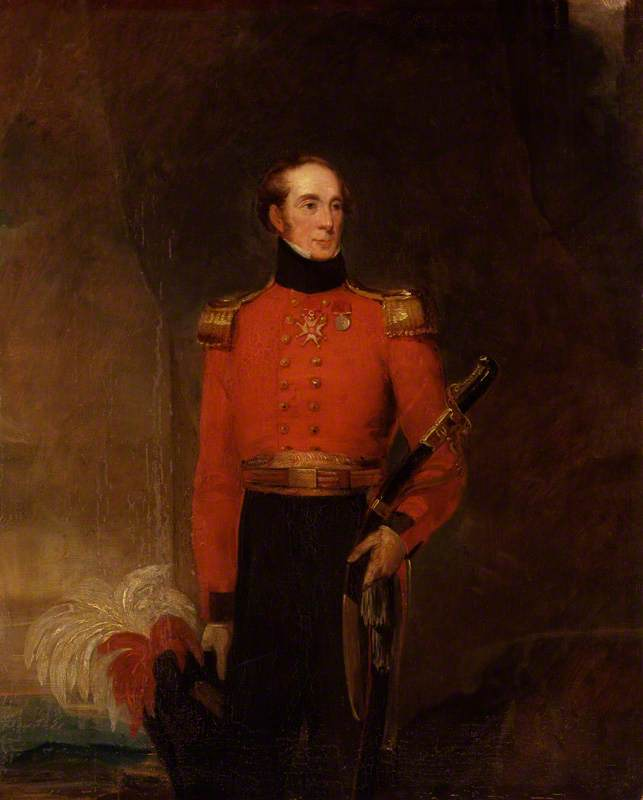
- Portrait by William Salter
- Died: 14 January 1858; London
- Military career
- Allegiance: United Kingdom
- Branch: British Army
- Service years: 1796–1858
- Rank: Lieutenant-General
- Unit: 33rd Regiment of Foot 93rd (Sutherland Highlanders) Regiment of Foot
- Conflicts: French Revolutionary Wars; Napoleonic Wars; Invasion of Isle de France; Siege of Antwerp; Siege of Bergen op Zoom; Battle of Quatre Bras (WIA); Battle of Waterloo

Lieutenant-General Edward Parkinson CB (died 14 January 1858) was a British Army general and from 1852 until his death Colonel of the 93rd Highlanders.

== Life ==
His first commissions were in cavalry regiments, as Cornet from 27 February 1796 and Lieutenant from 12 January 1800. He was in the 20th Dragoons on Jamaica from 1798 until 1802, remaining with that regiment and being raised to Captain on 7 March 1806. He then switched to an infantry regiment, the 33rd Regiment of Foot, sailing to join it in India and acting as Deputy Adjutant General to the British invasion of Réunion in October 1810.

Promotion to Major came on 27 October 1810 and postings to Stralsund (1813) and Holland (1814), both with the 33rd Foot. He participated in the attack on Merksem and the bombardment of Antwerp, commanding his regiment in the storming of Bergen-op-Zoom, in which he received a severe contusion.

He was promoted to Major on 17 March 1813 whilst in the 33rd Regiment of Foot. and Brevet Lieutenant Colonel on the field of the Battle of Waterloo after being severely wounded at the Battle of Quatre Bras as second-in-command of the 33rd. He also received the Waterloo Medal. His brevet rank was made substantive on 18 June 1816, with further promotions Colonel (10 January 1837), Major General (9 November 1846) and finally Lieutenant General (20 June 1854) coming in the following decades.

He appears in The Waterloo Banquet and was invited to that annual event until at least 1847. By the time he was made a Companion of the Order of the Bath in the 1838 Coronation Honours he was with the 11th Regiment of Foot.

Military offices
Preceded by William Wemyss	Colonel of the 93rd (Highland) Regiment of Foot; 1852–1858	Succeeded by Sir Colin Campbell
