= David Forbes =

David Forbes may refer to:

- David Forbes (British Army officer) (1777?–1849), Scottish soldier
- David McHattie Forbes (1863–1937), Scottish agriculturalist, and plantation manager, judge, explorer in the territory of Hawaii
- David Forbes (mineralogist) (1828–1876), British mineralogist
- David Forbes, singer for Canadian band Boulevard
- David Forbes (sailor) (1934–2022), Australian Olympic sailor
- David Forbes (politician) (born 1956), Canadian provincial politician
- Dave Forbes (1948–2024), retired Canadian ice hockey player

== See also ==
- David Forbes Hendry (born 1944), British economist
- David Forbes Martyn (1906–1970), Scottish-Australian physicist
- Forbes (name)
