= General Forbes (disambiguation) =

John Forbes (British Army officer) (1707–1759) was a British Army brigadier general. General Forbes may also refer to:

- David Forbes (British Army officer) (1772–1849), British Army major general
- Edwin Alexander Forbes (1860–1915), California National Guard brigadier general
- George Forbes, 4th Earl of Granard (1710–1769), British Army lieutenant general
- George Forbes, 6th Earl of Granard (1760–1837), British Army lieutenant general
- Gordon Forbes (British Army officer) (1738–1828), British Army general
- James Forbes, 17th Lord Forbes (1765–1843), British Army general
- Robert C. Forbes (1917–2002), U.S. Army major general

== See also ==
- James Forbes-Robertson (1884–1955), British Army temporary brigadier general
