= Richard Egerton =

British Army officer (1783–1854)

Richard Egerton CB
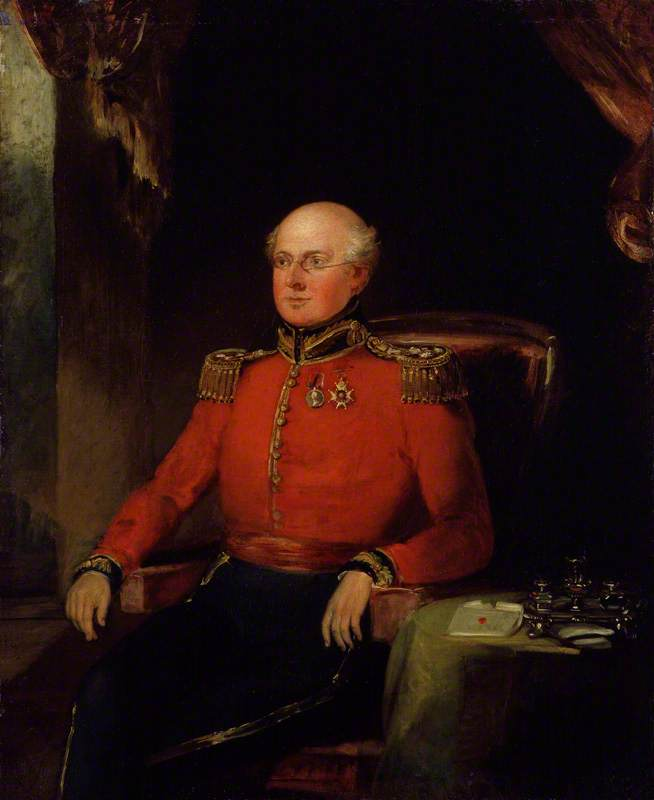
- Egerton c.1838 by William Salter
- Born: 7 October 1783
- Died: 18 November 1854 (aged 71)
- Spouse: Arabella Tomkinson
- Military career
- Allegiance: United Kingdom
- Branch: British Army
- Service years: 1798–1854
- Rank: Lieutenant-general
- Conflicts: French Revolutionary Wars; Napoleonic Wars; British invasions of the River Plate; Peninsular War; Battle of Bussaco; Lines of Torres Vedras; Siege of Badajoz; Battle of Albuera (WIA); Battle of Vitoria; Battle of the Pyrenees; Battle of Nivelle; Battle of the Nive; Battle of Orthes; Battle of Toulouse; Hundred Days; Battle of Waterloo
- Awards: Military General Service Medal; Waterloo Medal
- Memorials: St Helen's Church, Tarporley

Lieutenant-General Richard Egerton CB (7 October 1783 – 18 November 1854) was a British Army officer who served during the French Revolutionary and Napoleonic Wars, predominantly as a staff officer. He fought throughout the Peninsular War, serving for two years as aide de camp to Rowland Hill. He reprised this role for the subsequent Hundred Days, participating in the Battle of Waterloo. Egerton continued his relationship with Hill after the end of the wars, serving as his private secretary when the latter became Commander-in-Chief of the Forces in 1828.

== Military career ==
=== War service ===
Richard Egerton was born on 7 October 1783, the eighth son of Philip Egerton and as such a younger brother of Sir John Grey Egerton. Egerton joined the British Army on 1 December 1798, serving as an ensign in the 89th Regiment of Foot. He was promoted to lieutenant on 29 March 1800, joining the 29th Regiment of Foot with which he served in North America. Egerton was subsequently promoted to captain on 28 September 1804, and on 8 November the following year transferred back to the 89th Foot. He fought in the British invasions of the River Plate in 1807 with the regiment.

Egerton transferred regiments again on 14 April 1808, joining the 34th Regiment of Foot. While in Britain he served as aide de camp to Lieutenant-General Banastre Tarleton while the latter commanded the Severn Military District. Egerton then travelled with the regiment to serve in the Peninsular War, arriving in July 1809. He first saw action at the Battle of Bussaco on 27 September the following year, before in July 1810 he was moved to serve as a staff officer. Appointed deputy assistant adjutant general to the 2nd Division, he moved in the same position to the 4th Division in March 1811. In this role he fought at the Battle of Albuera on 16 May, where he was wounded in action. Egerton continued with 4th Division until February 1812 when he returned to serve with the 34th.

Egerton's return to his regiment was only brief, and in November the same year he returned to the staff, this time as aide de camp to Lieutenant-General Sir Rowland Hill, passing up the opportunity of higher rank to remain on his staff. Egerton saw action at several subsequent battles, including the Battle of the Pyrenees in July–August 1813 for his services at which he was promoted to brevet major. Egerton continued with Hill for the rest of the Peninsular War, participating in the final engagement, the Battle of Toulouse, on 10 April 1814. When the Hundred Days campaign began he returned to service, again as aide de camp to Hill, and fought at the Battle of Waterloo on 18 June 1815. On the same day he was promoted to brevet lieutenant-colonel, serving in the subsequent Army of Occupation. For his services in the wars he was awarded the Military General Service Medal with clasps for eight battles.

=== Peace ===
Egerton continued in the army after the end of the wars. When Hill was appointed Commander-in-Chief of the Forces in 1828 he brought Egerton with him to serve as his private secretary and first aide de camp. Egerton was subsequently promoted to brevet colonel on 10 January 1837 and in the 1838 Coronation Honours was appointed a Companion of the Order of the Bath. Through seniority he succeeded to major-general on 9 November 1846 before being appointed colonel of the regiment to the 46th Regiment of Foot on 24 January 1853. His final promotion, to lieutenant-general, occurred on 20 June 1854.

Egerton appears in the painting The Waterloo Banquet and was invited to that annual event celebrating the battle at Apsley House until at least 1852. He and his wife Arabella, the sister of fellow army officer Lieutenant-Colonel William Tomkinson, lived with Hill in his final years, with Egerton acting as his private secretary and financial manager. Egerton later moved to Tarporley, renting Arderne Hall and building an abbey folly on what is now part of Portal Golf Club. He died on 18 November 1854 and is memorialised by a brass tablet within St Helen's Church, Tarporley.

== Citations ==
Military offices
Preceded by Lord Stair	Colonel of the 46th Regiment of Foot; 1853–1854	Succeeded by John Pennefather
