= John Colvin =

John Colvin may refer to:

- John Russell Colvin (1807–1857), former lieutenant governor of India
- John O. Colvin (born 1946), U.S. Tax Court judge
- John Colvin (diplomat) (1922–2003), British Ambassador - Outer Mongolia
- John Colvin (politician), South Dakota legislator (1895–1898) and Speaker of the South Dakota House of Representatives (1897–1898)
- Jack Colvin, American character actor
- John Colvin (engineer)
