= Thomas Staunton St Clair =

Major-General Thomas Staunton St Clair KH CB
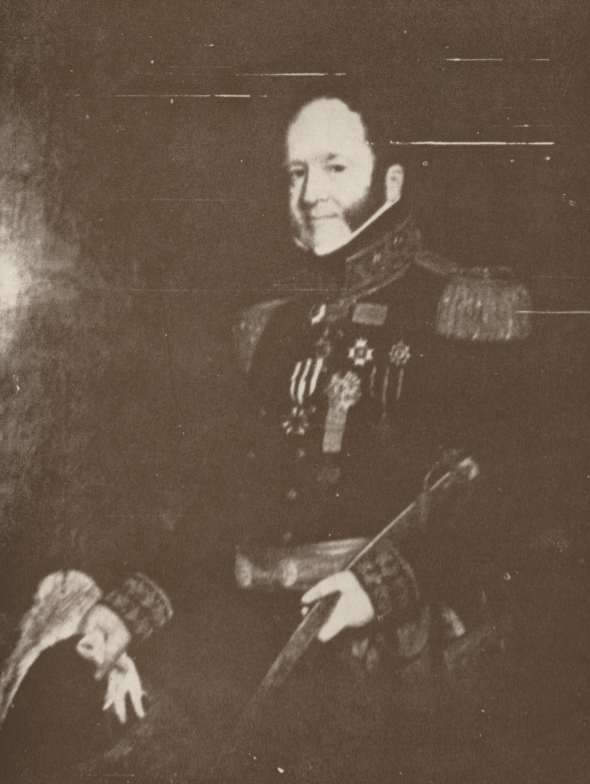
- St Clair in the uniform of a Portuguese brigadier-general (after 1842)
- Born: 1785; Gibraltar
- Died: 5 November 1847 (aged 61–62); Malta
- Spouse: Caroline Woodbridge
- Military career
- Allegiance: United Kingdom
- Branch: British Army; Portuguese Army
- Service years: 1803–1847
- Rank: Major-General
- Conflicts: Napoleonic Wars; Walcheren Campaign; Peninsular War; Battle of Busaco; Battle of Pombal; Battle of Sabugal; Battle of Fuentes d'Onoro; Siege of Badajoz; Battle of Nivelle; Battle of the Nive; Battle of Bayonne
- Awards: Army Gold Medal; Military General Service Medal

Major General Thomas Staunton St Clair KH CB (1785 – 5 November 1847) was a Scottish officer in the British Army known for his water-colour paintings which recorded British colonies in Gibraltar.

== Life ==
St Clair was born in Gibraltar in 1785 where his father, William, was a colonel of the "Scottish Borderers" – the 25th regiment. St Clair's childhood was spent in Scotland at Rosslyn Castle where his father was employed by the first Earl of Rosslyn. Thomas had an elder brother called William who was involved with the mutiny in Gibraltar. William died fighting in Martinique in 1809. He also had a brother David and two sisters. His father was a friend of Prince Edward, Duke of Kent and Strathearn and he was able to use this to advance his career more rapidly.

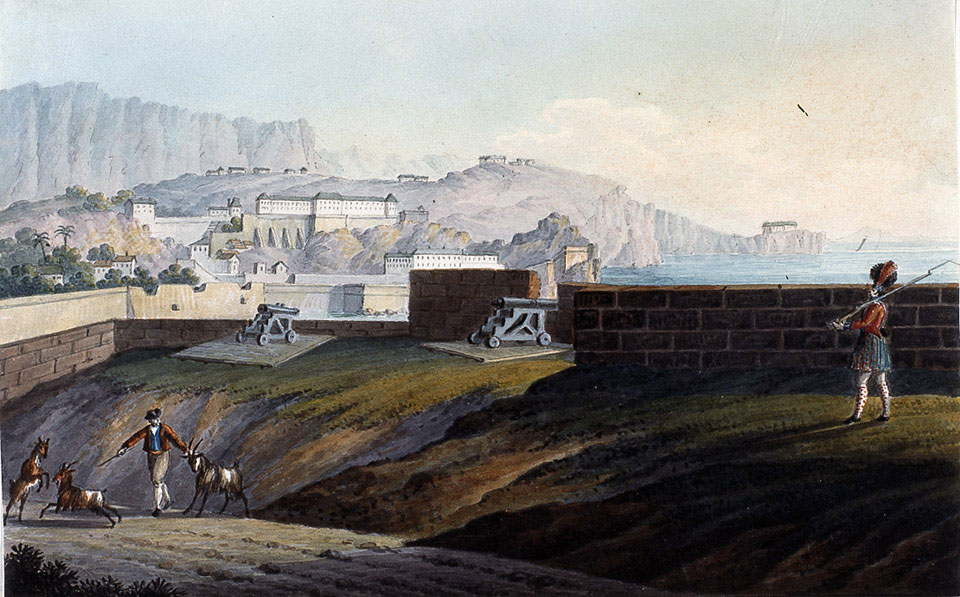
St Clair's painting of "The Naval Stores at Rosia Bay" in 1827

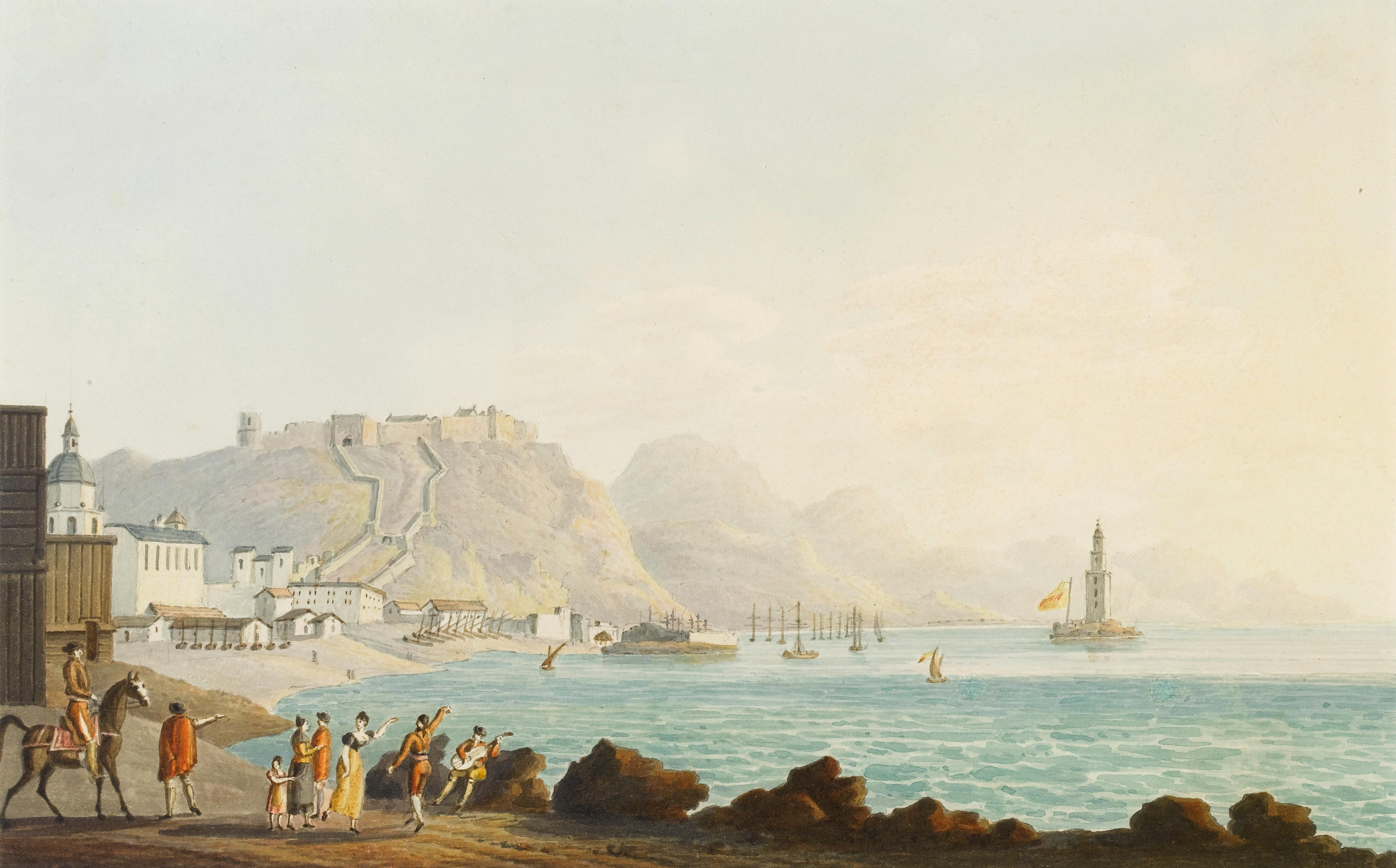
His painting of Malaga's bay and castle near Churrana

He signed up for the British Army, joining the 94th Regiment of Foot in 1803, and the following year he was made a lieutenant. In 1806 he was posted to the West Indies as an ensign in the Royal Scots, who garrisoned Berbice and Demerara during the first decade of the 1800s. In the summer of 1809 he took part in the Walcheren Campaign in the Netherlands. In 1814 he was awarded an Army Gold Medal for his part in the Battle of the Nive. By 21 June 1817 he was a lieutenant colonel.

In 1820, St. Clair returned to the Rock of Gibraltar as one of the senior officers in command of the garrison at the age of just 36.

In 1832 he was sent to Malta and in 1834 he published his autobiographical book A Soldiers Recollections of the West Indies and America. This included an account of his journey to Stabroek aboard HMS Brilliant that arrived early in 1806 and left him in South America until his return in June 1808.

He was appointed a Companion of the Order of the Bath (CB) in the 1838 Coronation Honours. St. Clair died in Malta in 1847 a year after he was made a major-general.

== Legacy ==
He married Caroline Woodbridge of Richmond, Surrey who was ten years younger than him and they had children. St. Clair has paintings in Gibraltar Museum
