= John Cheape =

Scottish general in South Asia (1792–1875)

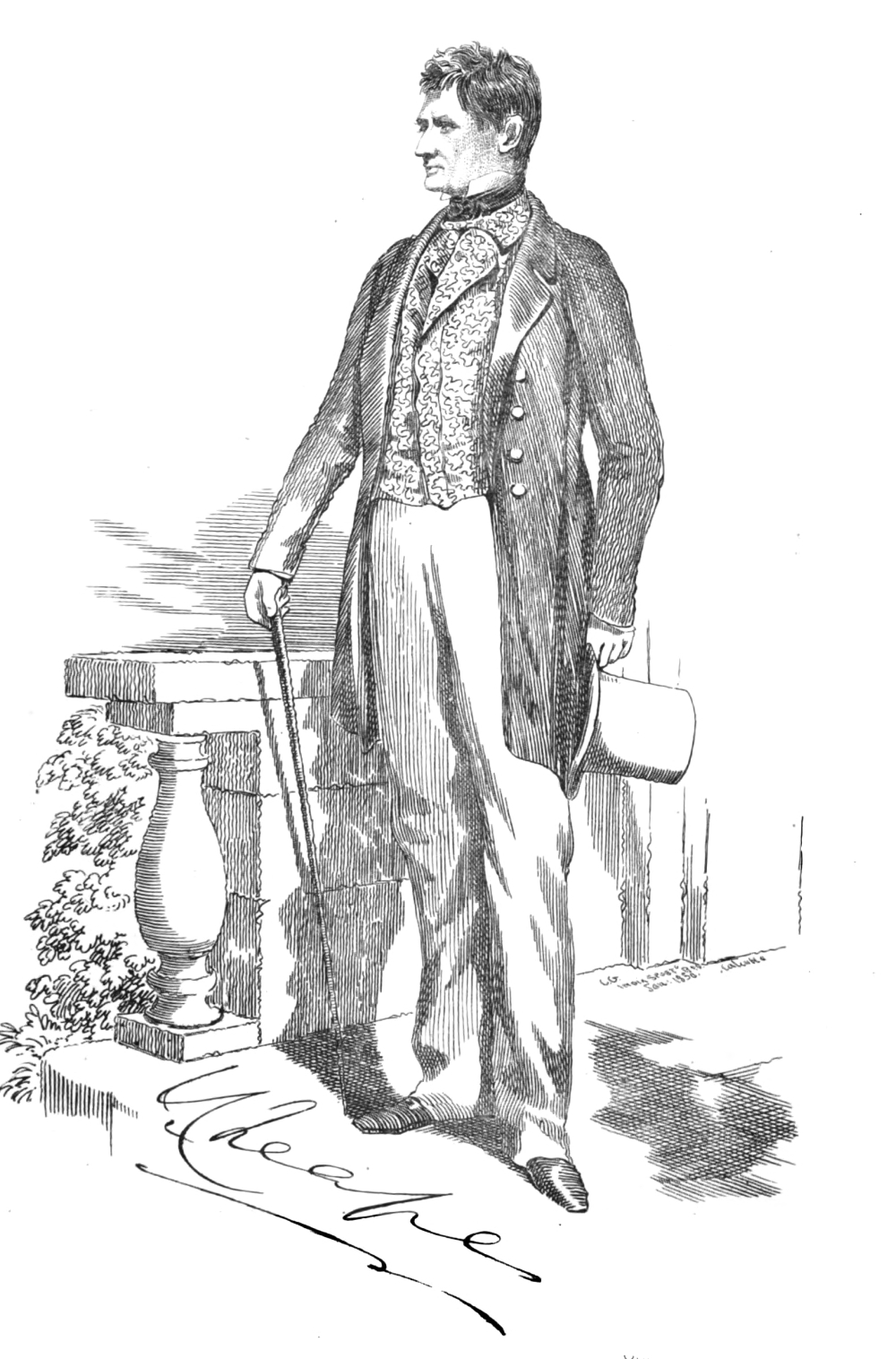
Sir John Cheape

General Sir John Cheape GCB (5 October 1792 – 30 March 1875) was a Scottish military officer of the Bengal Army in British India.

== Life ==
The son of John Cheape of Rossie, Fife, he was educated at Woolwich and Addiscombe, and entered the Bengal Engineers as a second lieutenant on 3 November 1809. He first served in the Third Anglo-Maratha War, and was present at the sieges of Dhamoni and Mondela in 1815 and 1816. He next served with the Narmada River field force under Colonel Adams in 1817 (in what is now Madhya Pradesh); and under John Doveton and John Malcolm in 1818, he was present at the siege of Asirgarh. He was promoted captain on 1 March 1821.

In 1824 Cheape was ordered to Burma, and served through the three campaigns of the First Anglo-Burmese War. Then for more than two decades he was employed in civil engineering. His promotion, however, went on, and he became major in 1830, lieutenant-colonel in 1834, and colonel in 1844. In 1848 Cheape happened to be employed in the Punjab when the Siege of Multan was being planned. He was appointed chief engineer, and ran the operations which led to the fall of the fortress. He then joined the army under Hugh Gough. He directed the artillery fire in the Battle of Gujrat, the decisive moment in the Second Anglo-Sikh War. Gough mentioned his services in his despatches, and Cheape was made a C.B. in the 1838 Coronation Honours and an aide-de-camp to the queen.

When the Second Anglo-Burmese War broke out in 1852, Cheape was made a brigadier-general and appointed second in command to General Henry Godwin. Although the British successfully overcame resistance from the Burmese army, their commanders underestimated local resistance and Captain Loch was killed in an ambush by the rebel Nga Myat Tun, Nya Myat Toon, or Myat-thoon near Danubyu in early February 1853. Cheape then took over command and invaded Pegu. He was successful and concluded the war, with the provinces of Pegu and Tenasserim annexed to the territories of the East India Company.

Cheape was made a K.C.B. in 1849, received a medal and clasp and was promoted to major-general on 20 June 1854. He then left India after a service of 46 years. He established himself in the Isle of Wight. Promoted lieutenant-general on 24 May 1859, and general on 6 December 1866, and made a G.C.B. in 1865. He died at Old Park, Ventnor, on 30 March 1875.

== Family ==
Cheape married in 1835 Amelia, daughter of T. Chicheley Plowden of the Bengal civil service.

== Notes ==
This article incorporates text from a publication now in the public domain: Stephen, Leslie, ed. (1887). "Cheape, John". Dictionary of National Biography. Vol. 10. London: Smith, Elder & Co.
