= Paolo Ruffo di Bagnara =

Neapolitan diplomat and soldier

Paolo Ruffo di Bagnara 3rd Prince of Castelcicala 2nd Duke of Calvello
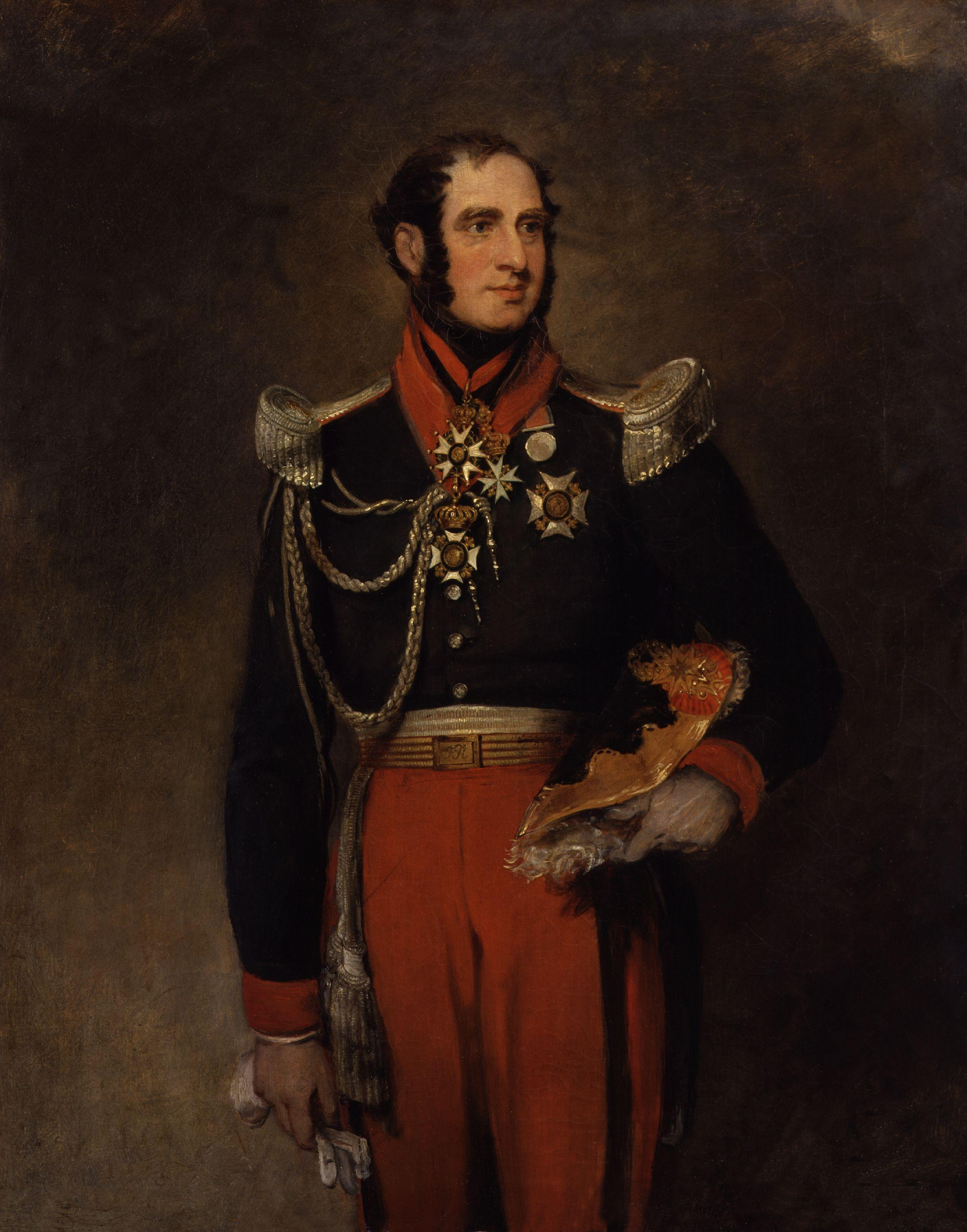
- Portrait by William Salter

Lieutenant General of Sicily
- In office 13 March 1855 – 17 May 1860
- Preceded by: Carlo Filangieri
- Succeeded by: Ferdinando Lanza

Personal details
- Born: 2 July 1791 Richmond, England
- Died: 12 November 1865 (aged 74) Paris, France
- Parent: fr:Fabrizio Ruffo (father)

Military service
- Battles/wars: Battle of Waterloo; Expedition of the Thousand

Paolo Ruffo di Bagnara, Prince of Castelcicala (1791–1865) was a Neapolitan diplomat and soldier. As Lieutenant Paul Ruffo he served with the British Dragoon Guards at the Battle of Waterloo. He was Neapolitan envoy to London in 1840.

== See also ==
- Kingdom of Naples
- Kingdom of the Two Sicilies

== Sources ==
- Majo, Silvio de (2017). "Ruffo, Paolo, principe di Castelcicala". Dizionario Biografico degli Italiani. Vol. 89 (online ed.). Treccani.
- "Paolo Ruffo di Bagnaria". National Portrait Gallery. Regency Portraits Catalogue.
