= Queen's Own Cameron Highlanders =

Infantry regiment of the British Army

- Cap Badge of the Queen's Own Cameron Highlanders
- Active: 1793–1961
- Country: Kingdom of Great Britain (1793–1800); United Kingdom (1801–1961)
- Branch: British Army
- Type: Infantry
- Role: Line infantry
- Part of: Highland Brigade
- Garrison/HQ: Cameron Barracks, Inverness
- Mottos: Pro rege et patria (For King and country)
- March: Quick (band): The Cameron Highlanders; Quick (pipes): Pibroch Domhnall Dubh; Slow (band): Logie o' Buchan

Commanders
- Colonel-in-Chief: Prince Philip, Duke of Edinburgh

Insignia
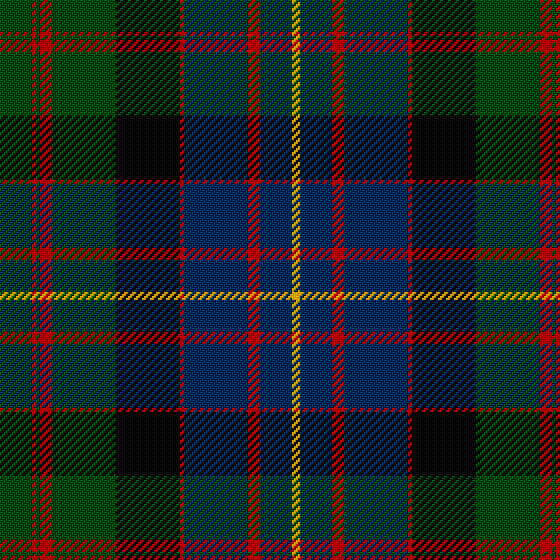
- Tartan: Cameron of Erracht
- Pipers: Royal Stuart tartan

The Queen's Own Cameron Highlanders or 79th (The Queen's Own Cameron Highlanders) Regiment of Foot was a line infantry regiment of the British Army, raised in 1793. It amalgamated with the Seaforth Highlanders (the Duke of Albany's) to form the Queen's Own Highlanders in 1961.

== History ==
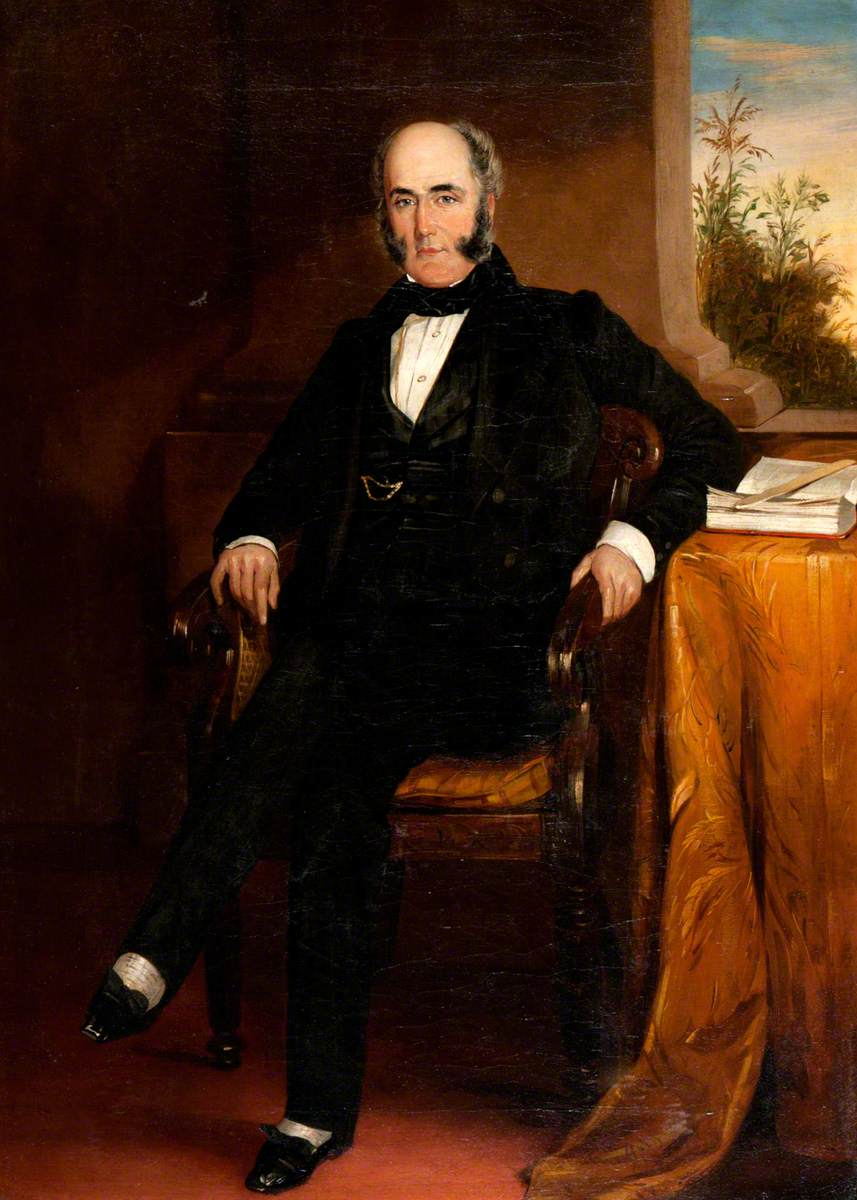
Alan Cameron of Erracht, founder of the regiment

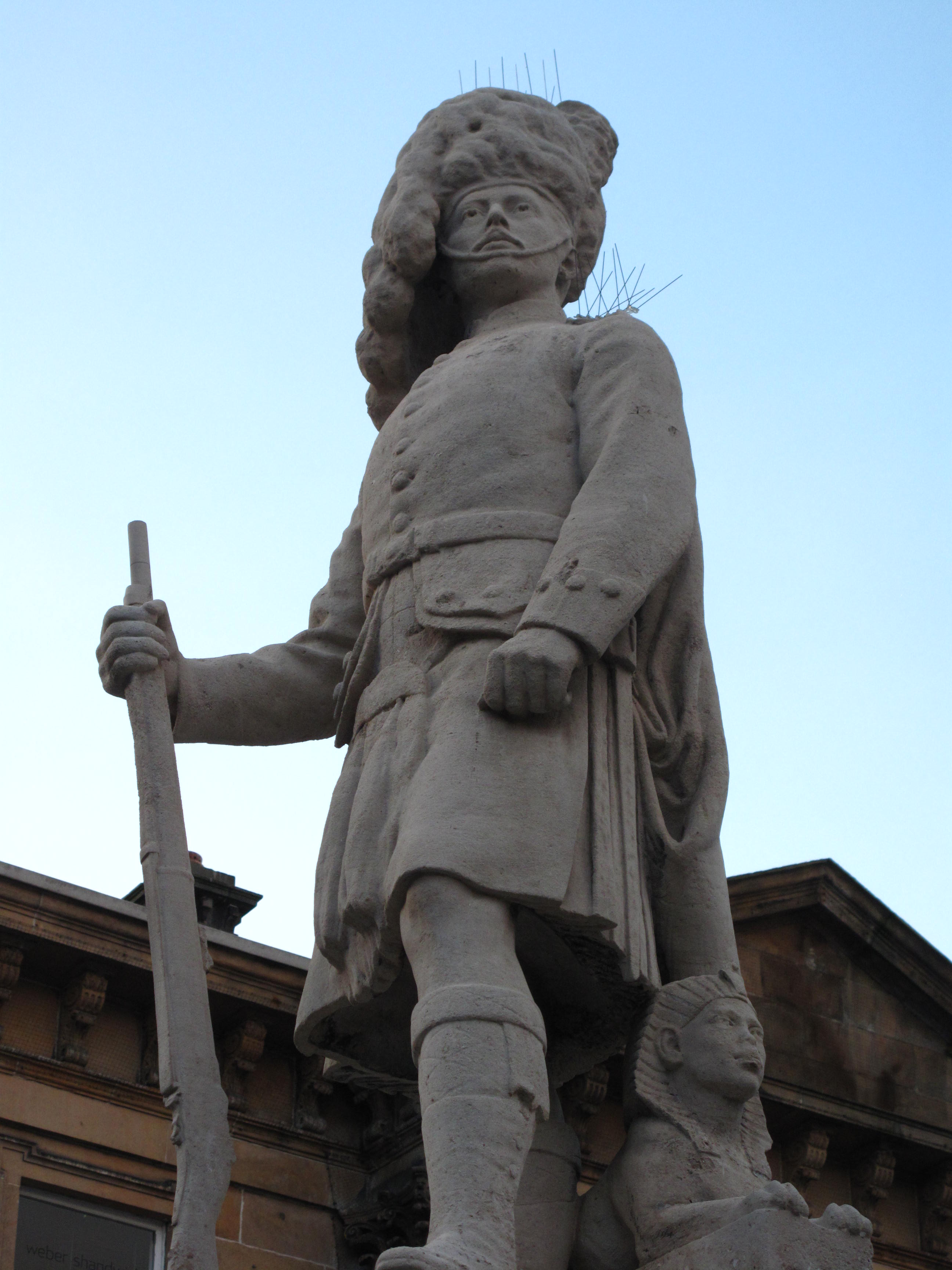
Memorial in Inverness to the Cameron Highlanders who fell during the Anglo-Egyptian War

The regiment was raised as the 79th Regiment of Foot (Cameronian Volunteers) on 17 August 1793 at Fort William by Sir Alan Cameron of Erracht, a cousin of Cameron of Lochiel. Initially mustered from among members of the Clan Cameron in Lochaber, the regiment eventually recruited from across the Highlands, and indeed, seldom elsewhere.

=== Wars with France 1793 – 1815 ===
The regiment was deployed briefly to Ireland and southern England, then to Flanders in 1794 where it took part in an unsuccessful campaign under the command of the Duke of York during the French Revolutionary Wars. On its return to England, the 79th Foot was listed for disbandment, with the men being drafted into other units. In the end the regiment was reprieved, being instead posted to the West Indies in 1795; after a two-year tour the 79th returned to England again. The regiment was again in action against the French at the Battle of Alkmaar in October 1799 during the Helder Campaign. In 1800 the 79th was part of a force that took part in a failed assault on the Spanish coast at Ferrol.

The 79th Foot landed in Egypt as part of an expeditionary force to prevent French control of the land route to India and saw action at the Battle of Abukir in March 1801. After victories at Mandora and Alexandria later that month, the British forced the surrender of the French forces at Cairo. Along with other regiments that took part in the Egyptian campaign the 79th Foot were henceforth permitted to bear a sphinx superscribed EGYPT on its colours and badges. The 79th spent the next two years in Menorca. A second battalion was formed in 1804, which supplied drafts to the 1st Battalion and did not go abroad, it being disbanded in 1815.

Originally on the Irish establishment, the regiment became part of the British Army in 1804 and was renamed the 79th Regiment of Foot (Cameron Highlanders). The 1st Battalion took part in the Battle of Copenhagen in August 1807 during the Napoleonic Wars.

In July 1808, the 79th Foot was deployed to Portugal for service in the Peninsular War. The regiment took part in the Battle of Corunna in January 1809 and was subsequently evacuated to England. The regiment returned to Portugal in January 1810 and saw action at the Battle of Bussaco in September 1810, the Battle of Fuentes de Oñoro in May 1811 and the Siege of Badajoz in March 1812. It fought at the Battle of Salamanca in July 1812, and took part in the occupation of Madrid in August 1812 and the Siege of Burgos in September 1812. It also saw combat at the Battle of the Pyrenees in July 1813, the Battle of Nivelle in November 1813 and the Battle of the Nive in December 1813 before taking part in the Battle of Toulouse in April 1814.

Following the abdication of Napoleon in April 1814, the regiment moved to Cork, Ireland. However, with the return of Napoleon from exile, the 79th Foot travelled to Belgium in May 1815. The regiment took part in the final battles of the Napoleonic Wars at Quatre Bras and Waterloo in June 1815. Of the 675 men of the regiment who took part in these battles, 103 were killed and a further 353 wounded. The 79th were one of only four regiments specifically mentioned by the Duke of Wellington in his Waterloo dispatch.

=== 1816–1880 ===
The 79th Foot remained in France until 1818, followed by home service, broken by tours of Canada (1825–36), Gibraltar (1841–48) and again Canada (1848–51).

In June 1854, the regiment sailed from Portsmouth to Scutari as part of the Highland Brigade for service in the Crimean War. It fought at the Battle of Alma in September 1854, the Battle of Balaclava in October 1854, the siege of Sevastopol through the winter 1854 and the expedition to Kerch, in the eastern Crimea, in May 1855.

After briefly returning to the UK, the regiment sailed to India to take part in the suppression of the Indian Rebellion. The regiment took part in the Capture of Lucknow in March 1858 and the Battle of Bareilly in May 1858, remaining in India until 1871 when they returned to the UK.

Queen Victoria presented the regiment with new colours at Parkhurst, Isle of Wight, on 17 April 1873 and directed they should be known as the "Queen's Own" in August 1873. Consequently, they became the 79th Regiment, The Queen's Own Cameron Highlanders.

Under the Cardwell reforms, in 1873 the 79th were linked to the 42nd Highlanders, the two regiments sharing a common depot at Perth, with the 79th supplying men to bring the 42nd up to strength for the 1873 Ashanti campaign.

=== 1881–1914 ===
On 1 July 1881, as part of the Childers reforms, the 79th Foot was redesignated as 1st Battalion, Queen's Own Cameron Highlanders, the county regiment of Inverness-shire. The Camerons were the only infantry regiment still to have a single regular battalion. The 1881 reforms also combined the Militia and Rifle Volunteers of the county with the regiment, they becoming respectively the 2nd (Militia) Battalion and the 1st (1st Inverness-shire Highland) Volunteer Battalion. In 1886, the new depot for the regiment, Cameron Barracks, was completed in Inverness by the Royal Engineers. In 1897 a 2nd regular battalion was raised, and the Militia battalion was renumbered to 3rd.

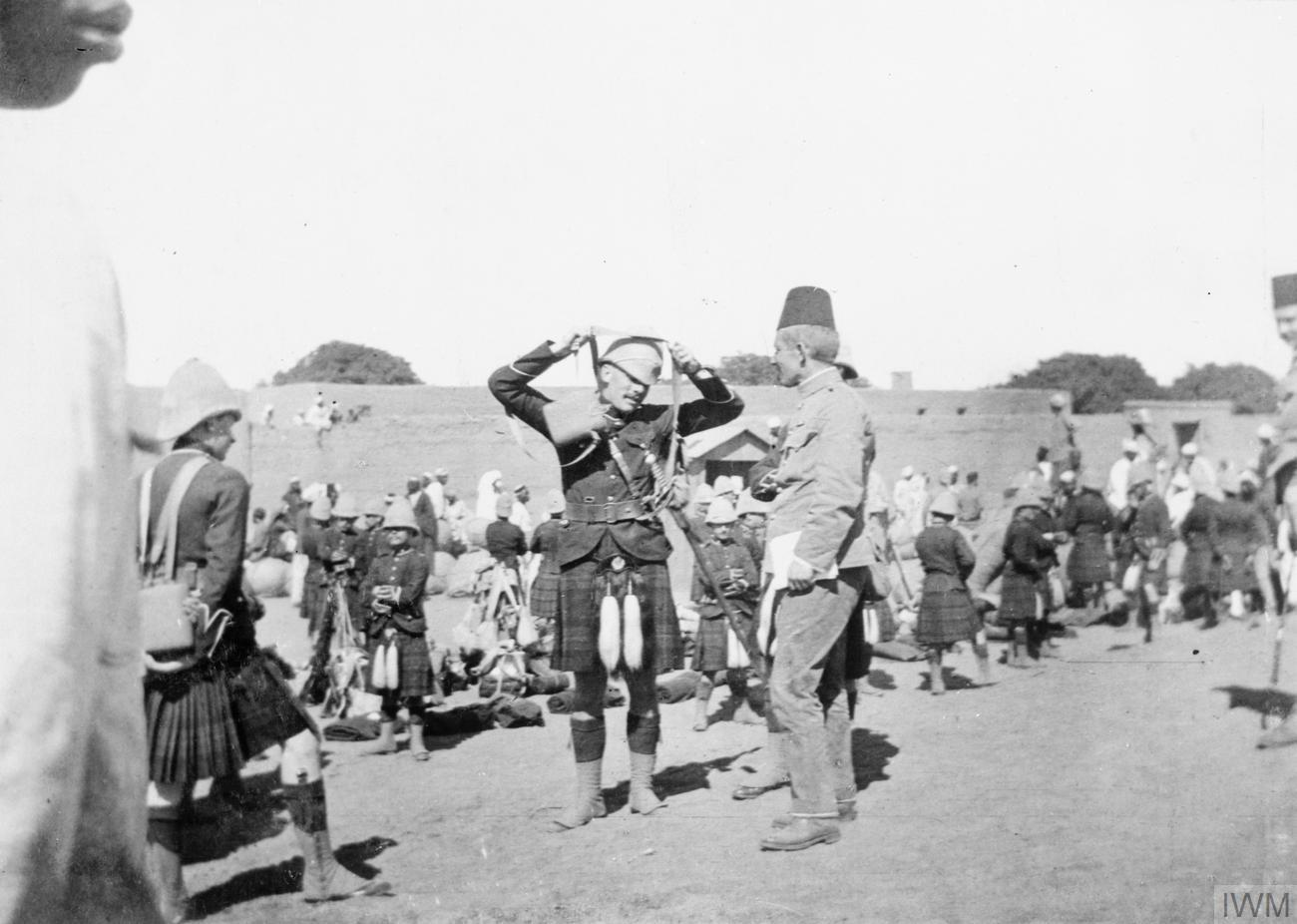
The Queen's Own in pith helmets and kilts in 1898 during the Mahdist War in Sudan

In 1882, the 1st Battalion moved from Gibraltar to Egypt, where they took part in the Anglo-Egyptian War, including the Battle of Tel el-Kebir in September 1882. Remaining in Egypt, they took part in the 1884-1885 Nile Expedition to the Sudan, including the defence of Kosheh and the Battle of Ginnis in December 1885.

Returning to the UK in 1887, a proposal to convert the Regiment into the 3rd Battalion Scots Guards was dropped after concerted lobbying. In 1892 the 1st Battalion were posted to Malta, then Gibraltar, moving to Egypt in 1897. The battalion were part of General Kitchener's force during the 1898 reconquest of the Sudan, they participating in the Battle of Atbara in April and the Battle of Omdurman in September, with one company being present at the Fashoda Incident.

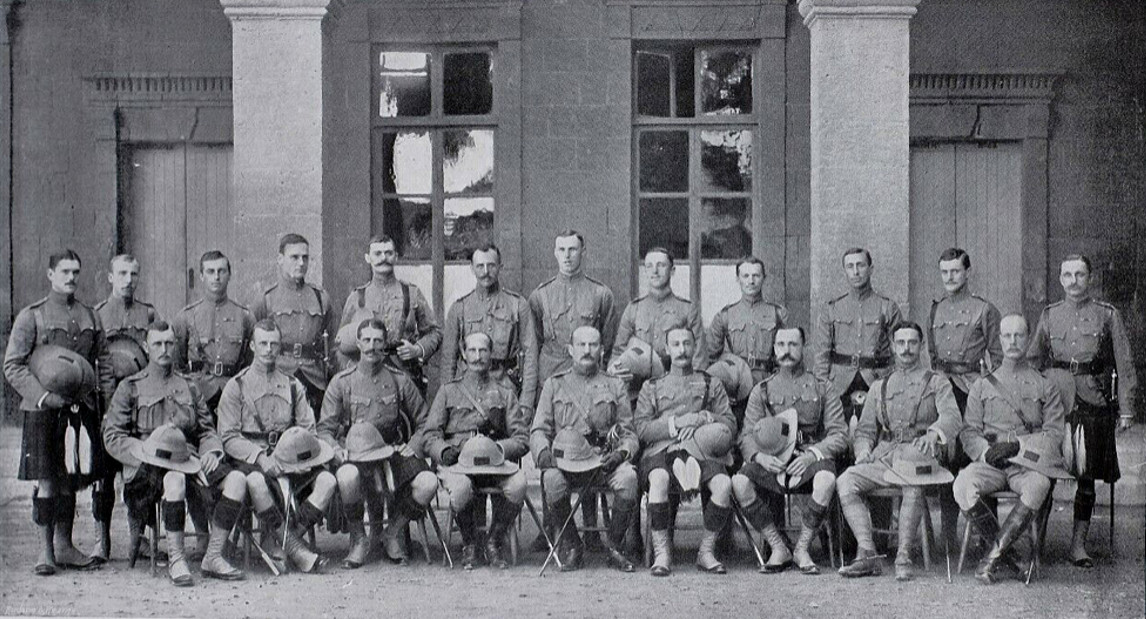
Officers of the 1st Battalion, Queen’s Own Cameron Highlanders, pose in Cairo, Egypt, before embarkation for South Africa, 1900. The central figure, seated and wearing boots and breeches, is Lieutenant Colonel Watson-Kennedy.

Returning to Cairo, the 1st Battalion travelled to South Africa in March 1900 and fought in the Second Boer War. On 27 February 1902, Lieutenants Harry Morant and Peter Handcock, formerly of the Bushveldt Carbineers, were executed following one of the first war crimes prosecutions in British military history by a firing squad of soldiers from the Cameron Highlanders inside Pretoria jail. Following the end of hostilities, 810 officers and men of the 1st battalion left Cape Town in the SS Dunera in late September 1902, arriving at Southampton early the following month. The 1st Battalion then remained in the UK until 1914.

In 1897, a 2nd Battalion was formed. Moving to Gibraltar in October 1899, it supplied drafts to the 1st Battalion during the Boer War. The 2nd Battalion remained abroad until 1914, moving to South Africa in 1904, China in 1908 and India from 1909.

In 1908, as part of the Haldane Reforms, the Volunteers and Militia were reorganised nationally, with the former becoming the Territorial Force and the latter the Special Reserve; the regiment now has one Reserve and one Territorial battalion.

=== First World War ===
Battalions of the regiment during World War I included;

First World War Battalions
Battalion	Notes	Service
1st Btn	Regular	Served in France
2nd Btn	Regular	In India, later served in France & Greece
3rd (Inverness, Banff, Elgin, and Nairn Militia) Btn	Militia	In Scotland then Ireland
1/4th Btn (d.1917): 2/4th Btn (f.1914, d.1918); 3/4th Btn (f.1915, d.1916)	Territorial: War Raised; War Raised	Served in France then disbanded: Remaining in the UK; Remaining in Ripon
10th (Lovat's Scouts) Btn (f.1914, t.1918)	Territorial	Formed in Cairo then served in Greece and France
5th (Service) Btn (f.1914, d.1918)	War Raised	Formed in Inverness and served in France
6th (Service) Btn (f.1914, d.1918)	War Raised	Formed in Inverness and served in France
7th (Service) Btn (f.1914, d.1918)	War Raised	Formed in Inverness and served in France
8th (Reserve) Btn (f.1914, c.1916)	War Raised	Formed in Invergordon and converted in 1916
9th (Labour) Btn (f.1916, t.1917)	War Raised	Formed in Blairgowrie and served in France
11th (Service) Btn (f.1918, r.1918)	War Raised	Formed in France and served there
1st (Home Service) Garrison Btn (f.1917, t.1917)	War Raised	Formed in Invergordon and remained in UK

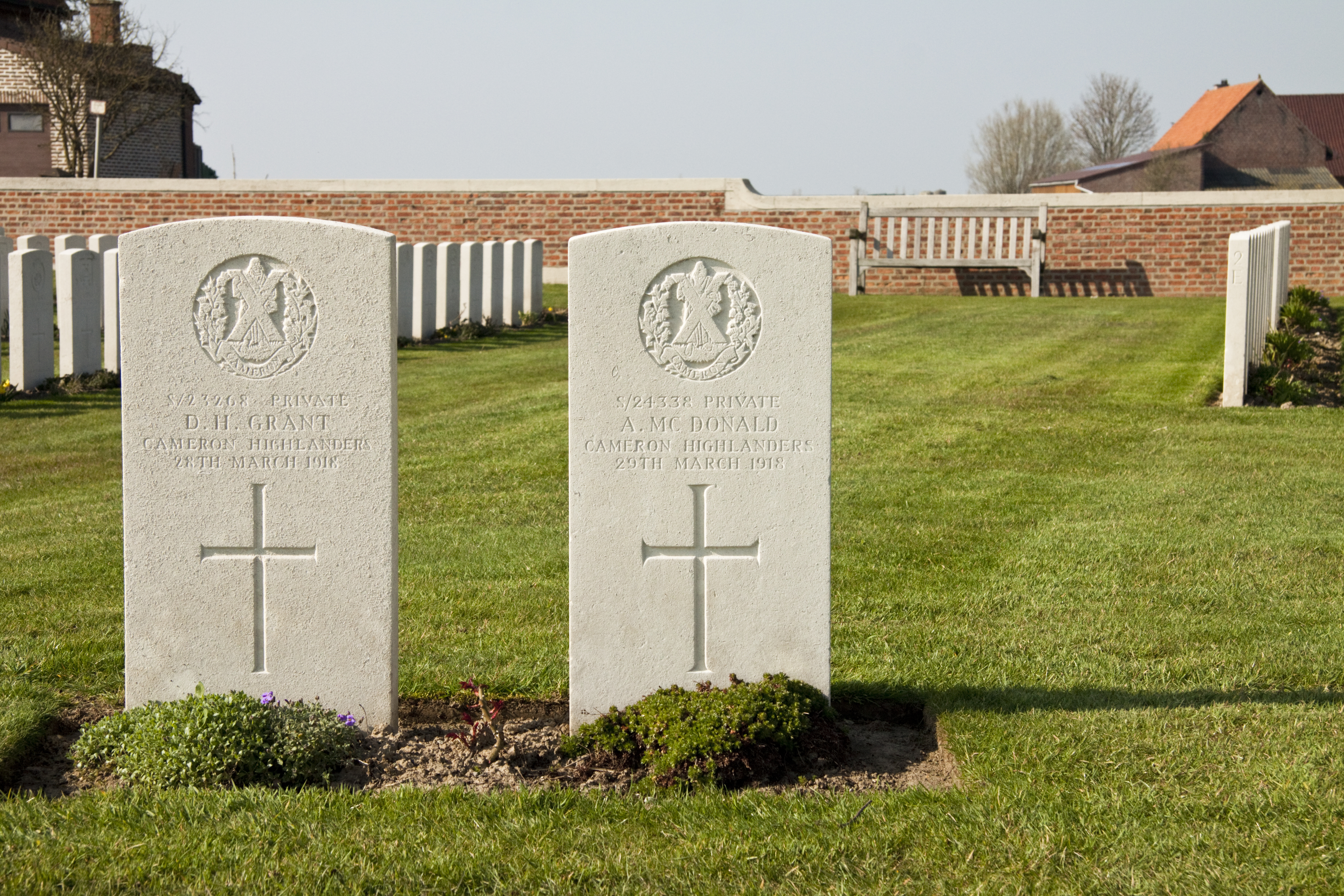
Graves of Queen's Own Cameron Highlanders killed in the First World War at the Cement House Cemetery in Langemark, Belgium

==== Regular Army ====
The 1st Battalion, commanded by James Douglas McLachlan, landed at Le Havre as Army Troops for the 1st Division in August 1914 for service on the Western Front.

The 2nd Battalion, which had been in India, landed at Le Havre as part of the 81st Brigade in the 27th Division in December 1914 for service on the Western Front and then moved to Salonika in December 1915.

The 3rd (Special Reserve) Battalion was posted to Birr in Ireland in November 1917 as part of a move to replace Irish Reserve Battalions with British troops at a time when there were concerns about the reliability of troops of both 'Nationalist' and 'Loyalist' communities.

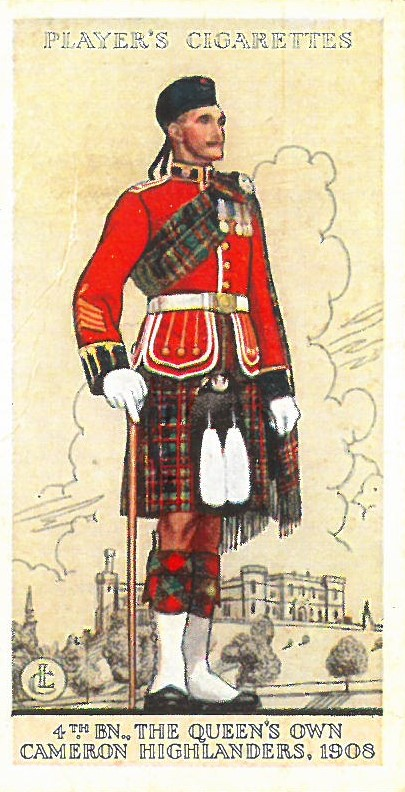
Player's cigarette card showing the Regimental Quartermaster Sergeant of the 4th Battalion, Queen's Own Cameron Highlanders of the Territorial Force in 1908.

==== Territorial force ====
The 1/4th Battalion landed at Le Havre as part of the 24th Brigade in the 8th Division in February 1915 for service on the Western Front.

==== New armies ====
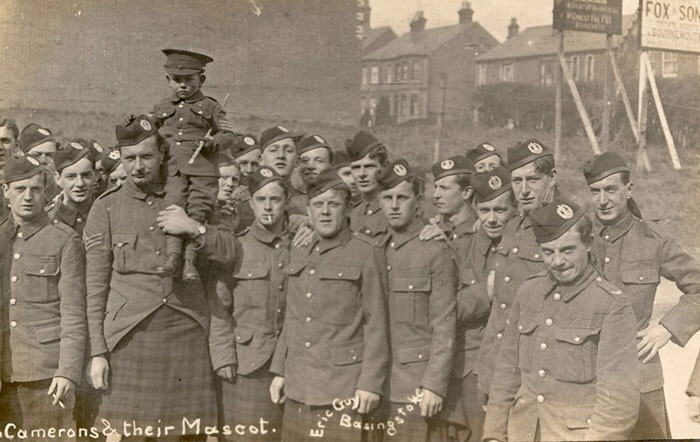
Group photograph of soldiers belonging to the 6th (Service) Battalion, Cameron Highlanders, which was part of the New Army, formed at Inverness in September 1914. The battalion moved through Hampshire, first to Aldershot and then Bramshott and later Basingstoke in February 1915.

Three service battalions of the Cameron Highlanders, raised in 1914, saw active service:
The 5th (Service) Battalion landed at Boulogne-sur-Mer as part of the 26th Brigade in the 9th (Scottish) Division in May 1915 for service on the Western Front, where they served for the remainder of the war.

The 6th (Service) Battalion landed at Boulogne-sur-Mer as part of the 45th Brigade in the 15th (Scottish) Division in July 1915 and also served on the Western Front for the rest of the war.

The 7th (Service) Battalion landed at Boulogne-sur-Mer as part of the 44th Brigade in the 15th (Scottish) Division in July 1915. They served on the Western Front until June 1918 when, due to high casualties incurred at Arras, the battalion was amalgamated with the 6th Camerons.

The North Uist-born war poet Dòmhnall Ruadh Chorùna, a highly important figure in 20th century Scottish Gaelic literature, served in combat with the 7th (Service) Battalion during the trench warfare along the Western Front and vividly described his war experiences in verse.

=== Inter-war ===
The 1st Battalion was posted to India 1919 and then to the Sudan in 1934, returning to the UK in 1936. Meanwhile, the 2nd Battalion was sent to Queenstown in Ireland where it saw action during the Irish War of Independence: the battalion was engaged in several fire-fights with the Irish Republican Army. In 1923 they joined the allied occupation forces in Germany, returning to the UK in 1926. In 1935 the battalion commenced a tour of foreign service, serving in Palestine, Egypt and, in 1938, India.

=== Second World War ===
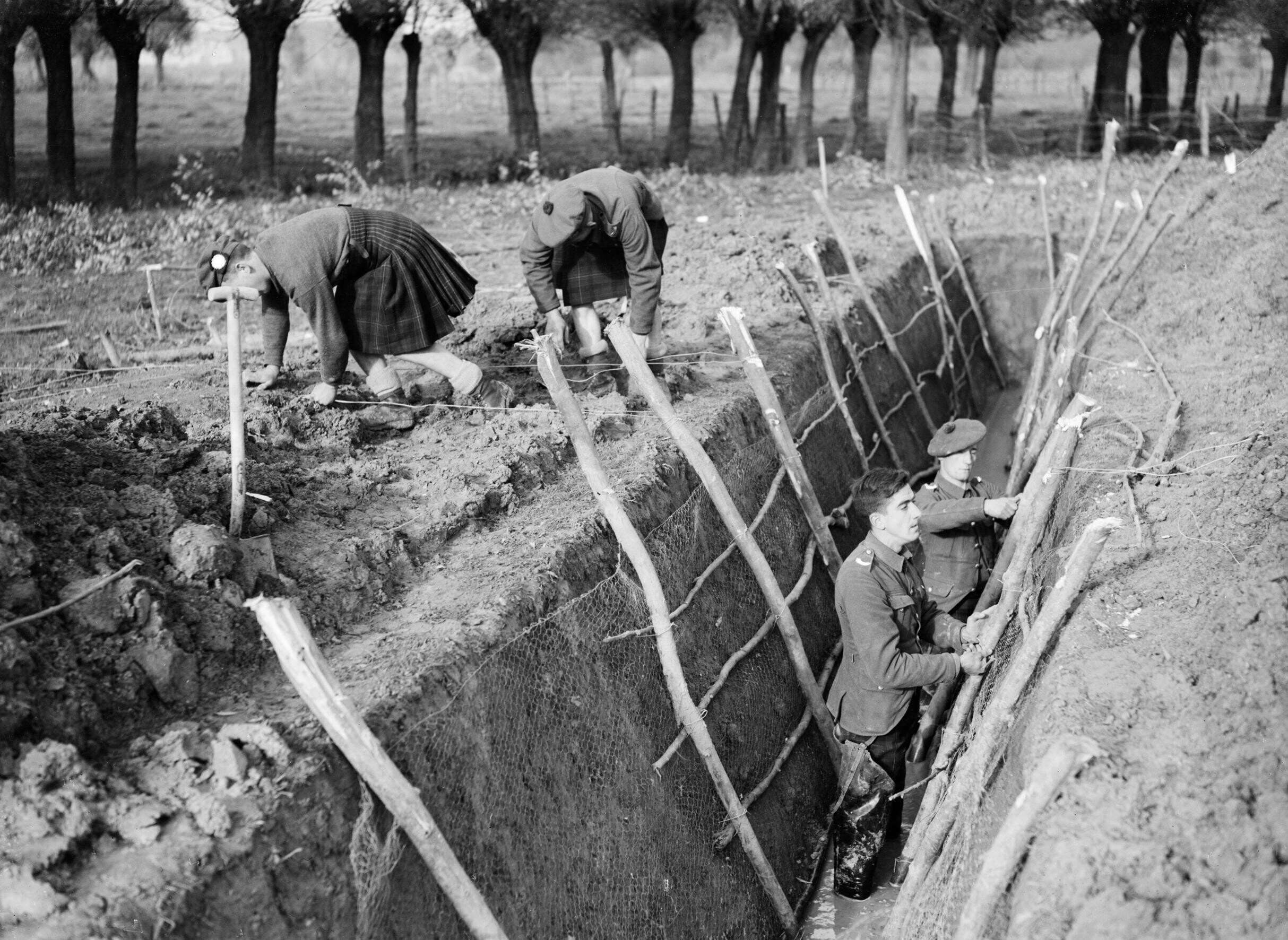
Men of the 1st Battalion, Queen's Own Cameron Highlanders digging trenches at Aix, France, November 1939.

The 1st Battalion, Queen's Own Cameron Highlanders, initially under the command of Lieutenant Colonel Douglas Wimberley, was sent to France as part of the 5th Brigade in the 2nd Division with the British Expeditionary Force (BEF) in September 1939. It then took part in the Battle of France and the subsequent Dunkirk evacuation in May 1940 under the command of Lt Col G P Rose-Miller, DSO, MC. After returning to England and being brought up to strength, the 1st Battalion was then deployed to Burma in mid-1942 and took part in numerous actions during the Burma Campaign, including the Battle of Kohima in April 1944, the Battle of Mandalay in February 1945 and the Irrawaddy River operations in March 1945.

Men of the 2nd Cameron Highlanders man a Bren gun set up on an anti-aircraft mounting in the back of a 15cwt truck during training at Mena Camp near Giza, Egypt, 4 June 1940.

The 2nd Battalion, which was still in Sudan at the start of the war, moved to Egypt and then Libya as part of the 11th Indian Infantry Brigade in the 4th Indian Division and fought in Operation Battleaxe. Following the Battle of Gazala was captured when Tobruk fell in June 1942. It was reformed in the UK in December 1942 and sent to Italy as part of the reformed 11th Indian Infantry Brigade in the 4th Indian Division in January 1944 and served in Tunisia, Italy and, at the end of the war, in Greece.

The 4th Battalion went to France as part of the 152nd Brigade in the 51st (Highland) Division with the British Expeditionary Force in October 1939 but, while commanded by Major-General Victor Fortune, they surrendered to Wehrmacht Major-General Erwin Rommel at Saint-Valery-en-Caux, Normandy on 12 June 1940. The 4th Battalion was reformed in the UK in July 1940 but was disbanded in December 1942 to form troops to reconstitute the 2nd Battalion. A detachment was also sent to the garrison of the Imperial fortress colony of Bermuda in August, 1940, replacing a company of the Winnipeg Grenadiers. When the deposed King Carol II of Romania arrived in Bermuda in May, 1941, Lieutenant Edward Cameron was assigned to escort him while in Bermuda. Second-Lieutenant Donald Henry "Bob" Burns was one of a number of members of the company to marry in Bermuda or settle there after the war. After the war, Burns would become Second in Command of the Bermuda Militia Artillery (1953 to 1965) and Officer Commanding Headquarters Company of the Bermuda Regiment (1965 to 1974), as well as the Guinness World Record-holding Town Crier of St. George's Town, which has commemorated him with the Major Donald Henry "Bob" Burns, MC, ED, Memorial Park on Ordnance Island.

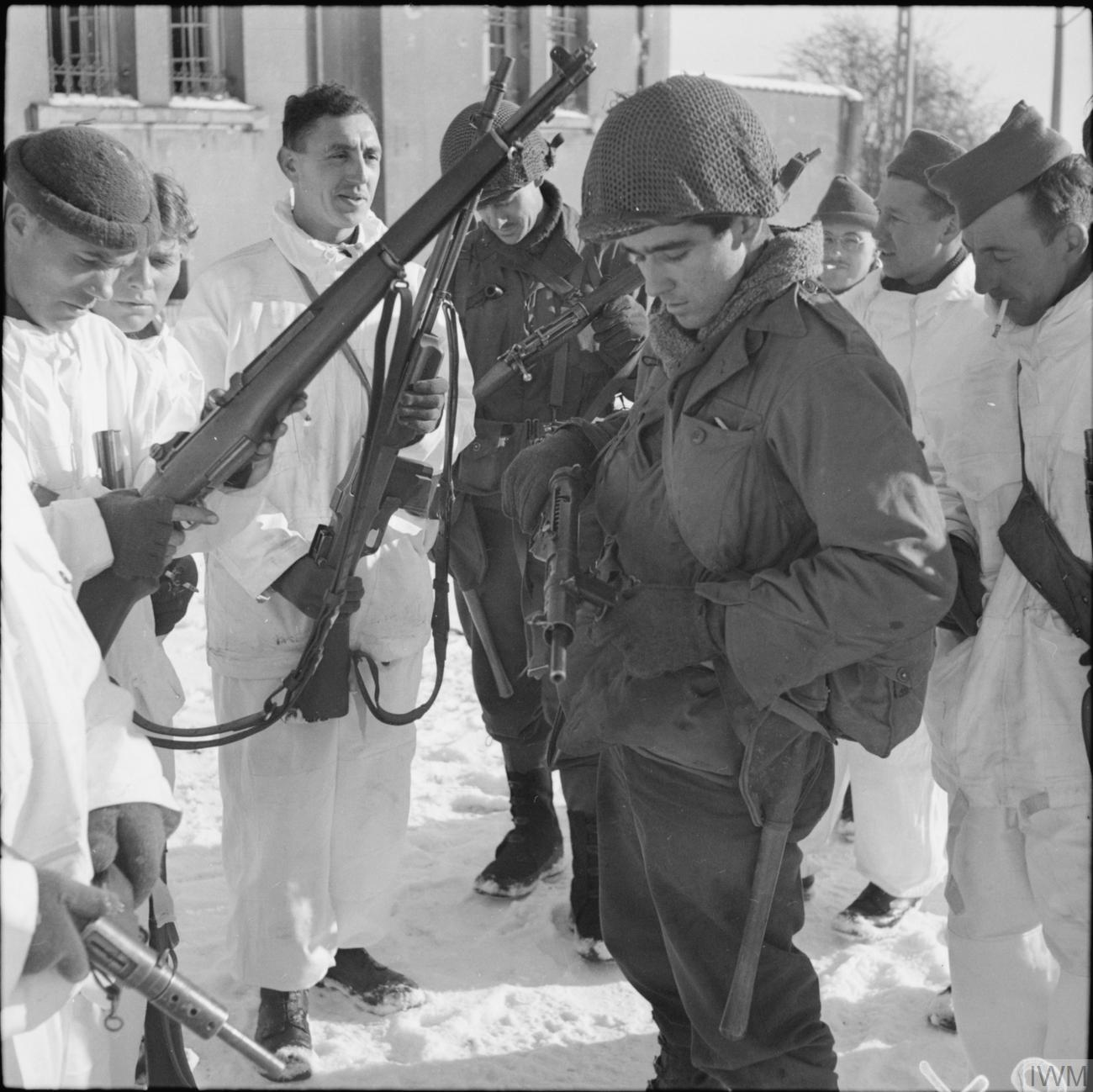
Men from the 5th Battalion, Queen's Own Cameron Highlanders wearing snow suits, inspect the weapons of two GIs from the U.S. 87th Division during the link-up of the two Allied armies at Champlin in Belgium, 14 January 1945.

The 5th Battalion formed part of the reconstituted 152nd Brigade in the 51st (Highland) Division and saw action at the Second Battle of El Alamein in October 1942 and the Allied invasion of Sicily in July 1943. The battalion took part in the Normandy landings in June 1944 and then fought at the Battle for Caen in July, the Battle of the Falaise Gap in August and the Battle of the Bulge in December 1944. The battalion was commanded by Lieutenant Colonel Derek Lang, later a future lieutenant general, from July 1944 onwards.

The 7th Battalion was part of the 46th (Highland) Infantry Brigade, in the 15th (Scottish) Infantry Division. On 24 March 1942 they were redesignated as the 5th (Scottish) Parachute Battalion. Those men that were deemed unsuitable for parachute duties were transferred to other units and were replaced by volunteers from other Scottish regiments.

The Australian 61st Battalion, which was raised as a Militia unit in Queensland in 1938, adopted the designation of the "Queensland Cameron Highlanders" after receiving official approval for an association with the Queens Own Cameron Highlanders in 1939. This battalion subsequently took part in the Battle of Milne Bay in August 1942 and the Bougainville Campaign in 1944 and 1945.

=== Post-war ===
After the war, the 1st Battalion served with the occupation forces in Japan, before moving to Malaya for internal security duties in 1947, returning to the UK a year later. Following the independence of India, all infantry regiments were reduced to a single regular battalion: accordingly, the 2nd Battalion was placed in "suspended animation" in 1948. In 1949 the 1st Battalion moved to Libya and the Suez Canal Zone, before seeing service in Scotland, Austria and Germany. In 1955, the regiment were part of the United Nations forces stationed in Korea after the Korean War, before deployment to Aden in 1956, returning to the UK in 1958.

Under the Defence Review announced in 1957 the number of infantry battalions was to be reduced, with regiments being amalgamated in pairs. Accordingly, the Camerons were amalgamated with the Seaforth Highlanders on 7 February 1961 to form the Queen's Own Highlanders.

== Battle honours ==
The regiment's battle honours were as follows:

- Early Wars: Egmont-Op-Zee, Egypt, Corunna, Busaco, Fuentes D'Onor, Salamanca, Pyrenees, Nivelle, Nive, Toulouse, Peninsula, Waterloo, Alma, Sevastopol, Lucknow, Egypt 1882, Tel-El-Kebir, Nile 1884–5, Khartoum, Atbara, South Africa, 1900–02
- The Great War: Retreat from Mons, Marne 1914 '18, Aisne 1914, Ypres 1914 '15 '17 '18, Langemarck 1914, Gheluvelt, Nonne Bosschen, Givenchy 1914, Neuve Chapelle, Hill 60, Gravenstafel, St. Julien, Frezenberg, Bellewaarde, Aubers, Festubert 1915, Loos, Somme 1916 '18, Albert 1916, Bazentin, Delville Wood, Pozières, Flers-Courcelette, Morval, Le Transloy, Ancre Heights, Arras 1917 '18, Scarpe 1917, Arleux, Pilckem, Menin Road, Polygon Wood, Poelcappelle, Passchendaele, St. Quentin, Bapaume 1918, Lys, Estaires, Messines 1918, Kemmel, Béthune, Soissonnais-Ourcq, Drocourt-Quéant, Hindenburg Line, Épéhy, St. Quentin Canal, Courtrai, Selle, Sambre, France and Flanders 1914–18, Struma, Macedonia 1915-18
- The Second World War: Defence of Escaut, St. Omer-La Bassée, Somme 1940, St. Valery-en-Caux, Falaise, Falaise Road, La Vie Crossing, Le Havre, Lower Maas, Venlo Pocket, Rhineland, Reichswald, Goch, Rhine, North-West Europe 1940 '44-45, Agordat, Keren, Abyssinia 1941, Sidi Barrani, Tobruk 1941 '42, Gubi II, Carmusa, Gazala, El Alamein, Mareth, Wadi Zigzaou, Akarit, Djebel Roumana, North Africa 1940–43, Francofonte, Adrano, Sferro Hills, Sicily 1943, Cassino, Poggio del Grillo, Gothic Line, Tavoleto, Coriano, Pian di Castello, Monte Reggiano, Rimini Line, San Marino, Italy 1944, Kohima, Relief of Kohima, Naga Village, Aradura, Shwebo, Mandalay, Ava, Irrawaddy, Mt. Popa, Burma 1944-45

== Victoria Cross recipients ==
The following servicemen from the Queen's Own Cameron Highlanders were awarded the Victoria Cross:

- Donald Farmer (Second Boer War)
- Angus Douglas-Hamilton (First World War)
- James Dalgleish Pollock (First World War)
- Ross Tollerton (First World War)

== Colonels-in-Chief ==
- 1902–1936: F.M. King George V
- 1936–1953: F.M. King George VI
- 1953–1961: F.M. The Prince Philip, Duke of Edinburgh, KG, KT, OM, GBE, AC, QSO

== Colonels of the Regiment ==
Colonels of the Regiment were:

=== 79th (Highland-Cameron Volunteers) Regiment of Foot ===
- 1793–1794: Lt-Gen. Sir Alan Cameron, KCB (Major Commandant)
- 1794–1805: Lt-Gen. Sir Alan Cameron, KCB (Lieutenant-Colonel Commandant)

=== 79th Regiment of Foot (Cameron Highlanders) - (1804) ===
- 1805–1828: Lt-Gen. Sir Alan Cameron, KCB (Colonel)
- 1828–1841: Gen. Sir Ronald Crauford Ferguson, Bt., GCB
- 1841–1842: Lt-Gen. Hon. John Ramsay
- 1842–1849: Gen. Sir James Macdonnell, GCB, KCH
- 1849–1854: Lt-Gen. James Hay, CB
- 1854–1862: Gen. Sir William Henry Sewell, KCB
- 1862–1868: Gen. Hon. Sir Hugh Arbuthnot, KCB
- 1868–1870: Lt-Gen. John Francis Glencairn Campbell, CB
- 1870–1876: Gen. Henry Cooper
- 1876–1879: Gen. Sir Alfred Hastings Horsford, GCB
- 1879–1887: Gen. Sir John Douglas, GCB

=== The Queen's Own Cameron Highlanders - (1881) ===
- 1887–1904: Gen. Sir Richard Chambre Hayes Taylor, GCB
- 1904–1914: Gen. Sir Ian Standish Monteith Hamilton, GCB, GCMG, DSO, TD
- 1914–1916: Col. Sir Donald Walter Cameron of Lochiel, KT, CMG
- 1916–1929: Lt-Gen. Sir John Spencer Ewart, KCB
- 1929–1943: Maj-Gen. Neville John Gordon Cameron, CB, CMG
- 1943–1951: Maj-Gen. Sir James Syme Drew, KBE, CB, DSO, MC
- 1951–1957: Maj-Gen. Douglas Neil Wimberley, CB, DSO, MC
- 1957–1961: Col. Sir Donald Hamish Cameron of Lochiel, KT, CVO, KStJ, TD

== Affiliated regiments ==
The following regiments were affiliated to the QOCH:

Canada

- Cameron Highlanders of Ottawa
- The Queen's Own Cameron Highlanders of Canada

Australia

- 16th Battalion (The Cameron Highlanders of Western Australia)
- 37th Battalion (The Henty Regiment / East Gippsland Regiment)
- 52nd Battalion (The Gippsland Regiment)
- 37th/52nd Battalion
- 61st Battalion (Queensland Cameron Highlanders)
- 39th Battalion (Hawthorn-Kew Regiment)

New Zealand

- Otago and Southland Regiment

Auxiliary Territorial Service

- The Inverness unit of the Auxiliary Territorial Service raised in World War II by Christian Fraser-Tytler, was based at the Cameron Highlanders' depot and its members wore kilts of the regiment's Cameron of Erracht tartan rather than khaki.

== See also ==
- Alan Cameron of Erracht
- Scottish regiment
- Lovat Scouts

== Sources ==
- Bowman, Timothy (2003). The Irish regiments in the Great War: discipline and morale. Manchester University Press. ISBN 978-0-7190-6285-8.
- Fairrie, Angus (1983). "Cuidich 'N Righ" A History of the Queen's Own Highlanders (Seaforth and Cameron). Regimental H.Q., QO Hldrs. ISBN 0-9508986-0-0.
- Jameson, Robert (1863). Historical Record of the Seventy-ninth Regiment of Foot, or Cameron Highlanders. Edinburgh: William Blackwood and Sons.
- MacAulay, Fred (1995). Dòmhnall Ruadh Choruna. Cumann Eachdraidh Uibhist a Tuath.
- Money Barnes, R. (1956). The Uniforms and History of the Scottish Regiments. London: Seeley Service.
- Raugh, Harold (2004). The Victorians at War, 1815-1914: An Encyclopedia of British Military History. ABC-CLIO. ISBN 978-1576079256.
- Watt, James (2001). History of the 61st Australian Infantry Battalion (AIF): Queensland Cameron Highlanders 1938–1945. Loftus, NSW: Australian Military History Publications. ISBN 1-876439-31-9.
