= William Henry Sewell =

General Sir William Henry Sewell KCB
- Born: c.1786
- Died: 13 March 1862; Florence, Italy
- Burial place: English Cemetery, Florence
- Alma mater: Westminster School; Eton College
- Spouse: Georgiana Hacking Hamilton
- Military career
- Allegiance: United Kingdom
- Branch: British Army
- Service years: 1806–1856
- Rank: General
- Commands: Madras Army
- Conflicts: Napoleonic Wars; British invasions of the River Plate; Peninsular War; Battle of Corunna; Battle of Talavera; Combat of the Côa; Battle of Bussaco; Siege of Ciudad Rodrigo; Siege of Badajoz; Siege of San Sebastián; Battle of Nivelle; Battle of the Nive; Battle of Orthez; Battle of Bayonne; Battle of Toulouse
- Awards: Military General Service Medal

General Sir William Henry Sewell KCB (c.1786 – 13 March 1862) was a senior officer in the British Army.

== Military career ==
Sewell was of unclear parentage, and according to some reports, was an illegitimate son of the Prince Regent (later George IV). He was raised however by Robert Sewell and his wife Sarah. He was educated at Westminster School and Eton College under the name of W.H. Robertson and joined the British Army in 1806 as an ensign in the 96th Foot under the name of William Henry Sewell. He then exchanged to the 16th Light Dragoons and rose through the ranks, via different regiments, to be lieutenant-colonel of the 6th Foot in 1817.

He was appointed aide-de-camp to General Beresford, going with him in 1808 to the Peninsular War. He was present with Sir John Moore's army at Corunna, Talavera, Busaco, Nivelle, Nive, Bayonne, Orthes, Toulouse and the sieges of Ciudad Rodrigo, Badajoz, as well as several other minor engagements.

After serving on Lord Beresford's staff in Maida and South America in 1807 he stayed on to command a Portuguese cavalry regiment from 1816 to 1818. Following his return from the Peninsula, he served in India from 1828 to 1854 successively as deputy quartermaster general in command at Bangalore, divisional commander at Madras and finally commander-in-chief of the Madras Army. He transferred from the 6th Foot to the 94th Foot in 1841 and was made major-general in that regiment in 1846.

In 1854 he returned to England and was made colonel of the 79th Regiment of Foot (Cameron Highlanders), promoted to lieutenant-general and knighted CB. He retired in 1856 and in 1861 was elevated to KCB and promoted full general on 26 November of that year.

He died in Florence in 1862 and was buried at the Protestant Cemetery there. He had married Georgiana Hacking Hamilton, the second daughter of Sir John Hamilton-Dalrymple, 5th Baronet, in 1831 St George's Cathedral, Madras. They had several sons and daughters, of whom Henry Robert and John Dalrymple William also became officers in the Army.

Military offices
| Preceded by James Hay | Colonel of the 79th Regiment of Foot (Cameron Highlanders); 1854–1862 | Succeeded by Hon. Sir Hugh Arbuthnot |
