= John Colvin (engineer) =

British engineer

John Colvin CB
- Born: 20 August 1794; Glasgow, Scotland
- Died: 27 April 1871 (aged 76)
- Education: Military Seminary at Addiscombe
- Occupation: engineer
- Years active: 1810–1839
- Known for: constructing canals in northern India
- Father: Thomas Colvin

Lieutenant-Colonel John Colvin CB (20 August 1794 – 27 April 1871) was a British engineer who served the East India Company in India, and who is mainly remembered for his role in constructing canals in northern India.

Colvin was born in Glasgow, Scotland, the son of Thomas Colvin, a local merchant. He was one of the first cadets to pass through the East India Company's Military Seminary at Addiscombe, passing his final examination in December 1809; after which he was appointed to the Bengal Engineers in 1810. Over the following 27 years he was principally involved in the construction of canals in northern India. He established a reputation as a first class engineer and was appointed superintendent of canals in the Delhi area, and later referred to as the "Father of irrigation in northern India". Colvin became interested in the fossils found in the Siwalik Hills and gave several large donations to the Asiatic Society of Bengal's museum, as well as specimens to museums in Britain. Colvin returned to England in 1838 and married Josephine Puget Baker, the sister of his colleague and friend William Erskine Baker at Ludlow. He was appointed a Companion of the Order of the Bath (CB) in the 1838 Coronation Honours.

Colvin retired in 1839 and became involved in the work of the Ludlow Natural History Society and their museum, as well as serving on local committees, as a magistrate, and as a patron of local good causes such as education.
