= Griffith George Lewis =

English lieutenant-general and colonel-commandant in the Royal Engineers

- Born: 10 November 1784; Woolwich
- Died: 24 October 1859 (aged 74); Brighton
- Occupations: Lieutenant-general and colonel-commandant in the Royal Engineers

Griffith George Lewis (10 November 1784 – 24 October 1859) was an English lieutenant-general and colonel-commandant in the Royal Engineers.

== Biography ==
Lewis was born at Woolwich on 10 November 1784. He was educated privately and at the Royal Military Academy, Woolwich. On completing the course of study at the academy, he was sent with the next two senior cadets to the west of England to be instructed in surveying under Major William Mudge, before obtaining his commission in the Royal Engineers. He was gazetted second lieutenant on 15 March 1803, and lieutenant on 2 July the same year. After a year at Chatham he joined the Portsmouth command, and in May 1805 embarked with the expedition under Sir James Craig. He served for a time at Malta, and then took part in the campaign of Naples and Calabria. He was present at the battle of Maida on 4 July 1806, and after it joined Colonel Oswald's brigade in a projected attack on the castle of Scylla. They arrived before the place on the night of 11 July. Lewis and the English engineers laboured unceasingly in the construction of the siege batteries, from which fire was opened on the 21st. So great was the effect that on the following day the garrison capitulated. It consisted of some four hundred sappers and miners and artillerymen, being all the men of the technical corps of the Calabrian army, under Colonel Michel of the French engineers.

Lewis was promoted second captain on 18 November 1807. He served under Sir John Stuart at the capture of Ischia and Procida in the Bay of Naples in August 1809, and in the Ionian Islands under Sir John Oswald at the siege of Santa Maura in 1810. In February 1811 he returned to England, staying at Gibraltar on his way, and was stationed at Woolwich. On 10 July he embarked with the expedition for Sweden and the Danish island of Anhalt, and returning in September was sent to the eastern district. In December 1812 he embarked for Portugal, and was employed in throwing up the lines round Lisbon. In 1813 he served in the campaign in Spain under Wellington. He was promoted captain on 21 July 1813. At the siege of San Sebastian he was twice wounded, and in the assault of the breach on 25 July so severely, that his leg had to be amputated above the knee. He was mentioned in Lord Lynedoch's despatches as having distinguished himself by gallant conduct, and was promoted brevet major on 21 September for his services. The same month he returned to England invalided. After some time on the sick list he joined the army of occupation in France, and in the autumn of 1817 was employed on special service.

On 18 January 1819 he embarked for Newfoundland, where he served for some years. On 29 July 1825 he was promoted lieutenant-colonel. He returned to England on 18 September 1827. On 1 April 1828 he embarked for Canada to serve on a commission on the Rideau Canal, and came home again on 6 September. He was commanding royal engineer at Jersey from December 1830 till January 1836; at the Cape of Good Hope from March 1836 until the autumn of 1842; in Ireland from January 1843 to January 1847, and at Portsmouth from January 1847 till 3 April 1851. On 20 June 1838 he was promoted brevet colonel, and on 23 November 1841 regimental colonel. From April 1851 until July 1856 he was governor of the Royal Military Academy at Woolwich.

He was promoted to be major-general on 11 November 1851, and lieutenant-general on 12 August 1858, and was made a colonel commandant of the corps of Royal Engineers on 23 November 1858. He received the Peninsular war medal with two clasps (Maida and St. Sebastian), and was made a C.B. for his war services. He also received a pension of 200l. per annum for life for his wounds, and a distinguished service pension of 100l. per annum. He died at Brighton on 24 October 1859.

On 6 March 1821 Lewis married Miss Fanny Bland at St. John's, Newfoundland. Lewis was joint editor with Captain J. Williams of the ‘Professional Papers of the Corps of Royal Engineers,’ and of the ‘Corps Papers,’ from 1847 until 1854. He also contributed to them the following papers: quarto series, vol. vi. ‘Use of Fascines in forming Foundations;’ vol. vii. ‘Application of Forts, Towers, and Batteries to Coast Defence and Harbours;’ vol. ix. ‘On the Value of Fortresses;’ vol. x. ‘Memoir of Professional Life of Lieutenant-Colonel Brandreth, R.E.,’ ‘Defence of Country South of London,’ ‘Campaign of the Sutlej;’ octavo series, vol. i. ‘Observations on the Explosion of Mines at Seaford;’ vol. ii. ‘Description of Military Chapel at Dublin,’ ‘De la Défense Nationale en Angleterre;’ vol. iii. ‘Field Works for the Defence of Sicily in 1810;’ vol. iv. ‘Topographical Notes on the Seat of War in Turkey;’ vol. v. ‘Coast Defences;’ vol. vi. ‘Preponderance of Attack over Defence in Sieges;’ vol. vii. ‘Influence of Fortification upon Military Operations.’ ‘Corps Papers,’ No. 1, ‘Remarks on Casemates for Sea Batteries,’ ‘Drawbridges.’
