= James Hay (British Army officer, born 1780) =

British Army general

Lieutenant-General John Hay CB
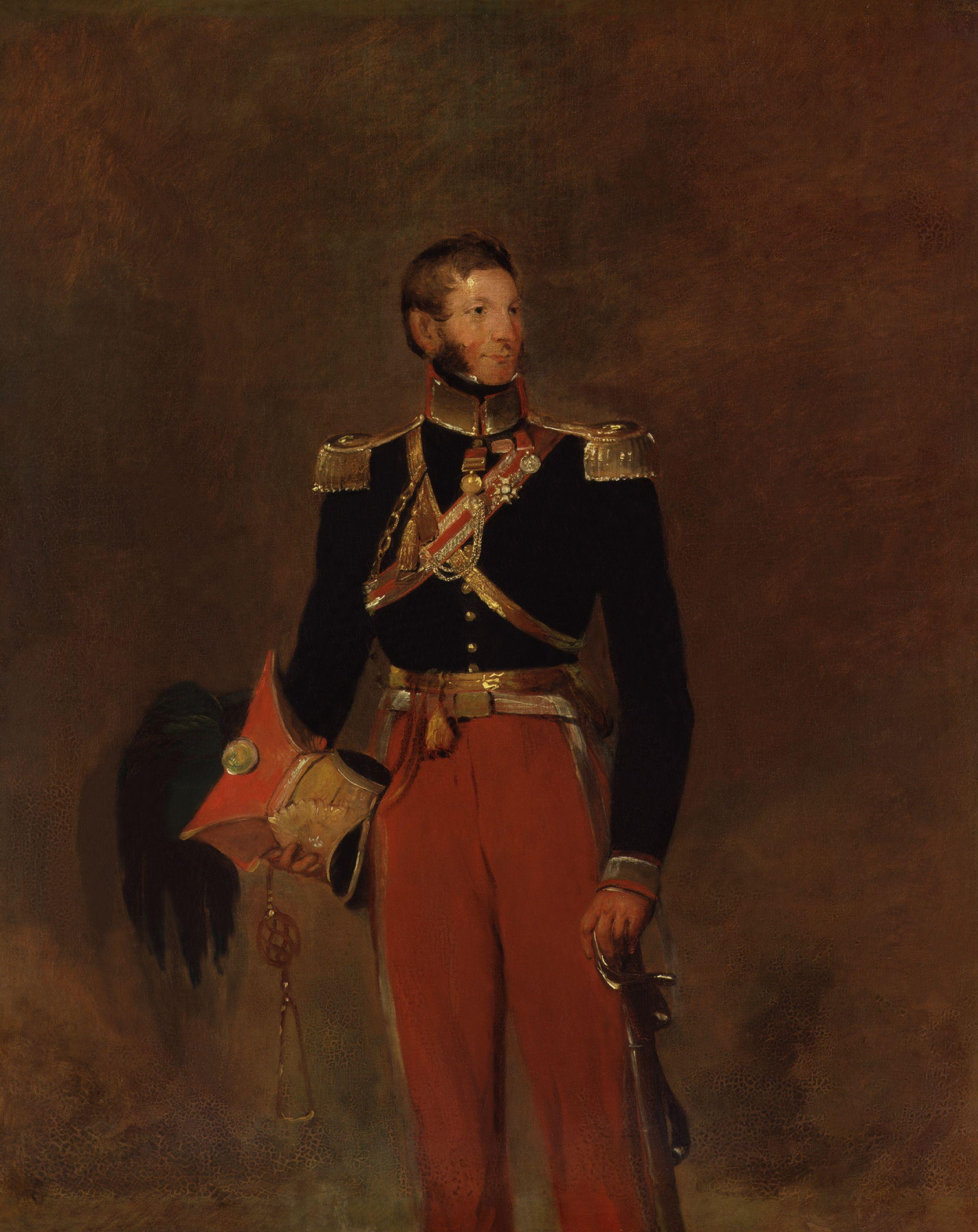
- Portrait by William Salter
- Born: 1780; Braco, Perth and Kinross
- Died: 25 February 1854 (aged 73–74); Kilburne, County Longford
- Burial place: Clongish, County Longford
- Military career
- Allegiance: United Kingdom
- Branch: British Army
- Service years: 1795–1854
- Rank: Lieutenant-General
- Unit: 16th Light Dragoons
- Conflicts: French Revolutionary Wars; Napoleonic Wars; Peninsular War; Battle of the Douro; Battle of Salamonde; Battle of Talavera; Battle of Redinha; Battle of Casal Novo; Battle of Foz de Arouce; Battle of Sabugal; Battle of Fuentes d'Onoro; Battle of El Bodon; Battle of Salamanca (WIA); Battle of Venta del Pozo; Battle of Vitoria; Battle of Nivelle; Battle of the Nive; Battle of Bayonne; Hundred Days; Battle of Quatre Bras; Battle of Waterloo (WIA)
- Awards: Mentioned in dispatches Army Gold Medal; Military General Service Medal

Lieutenant-General James Hay CB (1780 – 25 February 1854) was a British Army officer who saw service during the Peninsular War and the Waterloo Campaign. He was the last owner of the Arnolfini Portrait before it was bought by the National Gallery.

== Life ==
He was born in Braco, Scotland the son of John Hay and joined the 16th Light Dragoons as a cornet on 10 June 1795. He was subsequently promoted to Lieutenant on 4 March 1795; to Captain on 28 February 1799; to Major on 2 January 1812 and to Lieutenant-colonel on 18 February 1813.

During the Peninsular War, Hay was present at the battles of Vittoria and the Nive for which he received the Army Gold Medal with one clasp. He had his arm broken at the Battle of Salamanca. In one engagement he led his regiment against the Lancers de Berg during which 70 enemy men and a squadron chief were captured.

On 22 June 1815, on the recommendation of Wellington, he was appointed a Companion of the Most Honourable Order of the Bath (CB) for his services at Quatre Bras and Waterloo. He was so seriously injured at Waterloo that he could not be moved from the field for eight days.

He later claimed (very implausibly) that the Arnolfini Portrait hung in the room in Brussels where he recovered further, and he bought it from the landlord. It is far more likely that he had acquired it in Spain after the Battle of Vitoria, when a coach loaded with treasures from the Spanish royal collection by Joseph Bonaparte was captured and looted by British soldiers. Wellington ordered the recovery of as much as he could, and offered the works back to the King of Spain, who later let the Wellington Collection keep them. The Arnolfini painting is well-documented as being in the Spanish royal collection before the war.

Hay offered the painting to the Prince Regent, later King George IV, via Sir Thomas Lawrence. The Prince had it on approval for two years at Carlton House before eventually returning it in 1818. Around 1828, Hay gave it to a friend to look after, not seeing it or the friend for the next thirteen years, until he arranged for it to be included in a public exhibition in 1841. It was bought the following year (1842) by the recently formed National Gallery, London for £600, as inventory number 186, where it remains.

Hay was given the colonelcy of the 79th Regiment of Foot (Cameron Highlanders) from 1849 to his death. He died at his seat near Kilburn, County Longford on 25 February 1854.

Military offices
Preceded by Sir James Macdonnell	Colonel of the 79th Regiment of Foot (Cameron Highlanders); 1849–1854	Succeeded by Sir William Henry Sewell
