= William Salter (painter) =

English portrait painter

- Born: 1804; Honiton, Devon, England
- Died: 1875 (aged 70–71); London, England
- Known for: Portrait painting
- Notable work: The Waterloo Banquet

William Salter (1804 – 22 December 1875) was an English portrait painter of the 19th century. He painted a range of subjects - his best known works are The Waterloo Banquet (1836) in Apsley House and the related studies.

== Life ==
Salter was baptised on 26 December 1804 in Honiton, Devon, where he was also educated. He was able to work in James Northcote's studios from 1822. Five years later he went on a Grand Tour to Italy. His picture of Socrates before his Judges was painted whilst he was in Italy and is credited with his favourable reception in Florence and Padua, even teaching history painting at the Florentine Academy of Fine Arts until returning to England in 1833. He remained a member of the Florentine Academy until his death.

Honiton had a new church built in 1835 and Salter contributed his own altarpiece Descent from the Cross to it for free three years later. He and his patron Lady Berghersh (the Duke of Wellington's niece) both exhibited at the British Institution and he joined the Society of British Artists in 1846. Salter died at his home in West Kensington on 22 December 1875. He is buried at Kensal Green Cemetery, London.
