= Herbert Abbott =

Herbert Abbott may refer to:

- Herbert Edward Stacy Abbott (1814–1883), officer in the armies of the East India Company and British Crown in India
- Herbert Abbott (British Army officer) (1855–1939), English cricketer and British Army officer
- Bert Abbott (footballer) (1875-1911), English footballer
- Bert Abbott (rugby union) (1903-1973), Australian international rugby union player

== See also ==
- Bert Abbott
