= George M. Carmichael-Smyth =

British officer (1803–1890)

Major-General George Carmichael-Smyth (1803–1890) was a British commanding officer of the 3rd Bengal Light Cavalry. In April 1857 he punished 85 of his men when they refused to use the cartridges of the Enfield rifle which had recently been issued. In response the Native regiments rebelled. An account of the incident was written in an unsent letter by John MacNabb, a Cornet in the Cavalry.

Carmichael-Smyth was born in 1803, the youngest of eight sons of the physician James Carmichael Smyth. His elder brothers included Sir James Carmichael-Smyth and William Henry Carmichael-Smyth.

A history of the reigning family of Lahore - with some account of the Jumoo rajahs, the Seik soldiers and their Sirdars

== See also ==
- 20th Regiment of Bengal Native Infantry
