= John Campbell Erskine MacNabb =

British junior officer (1838–1857)

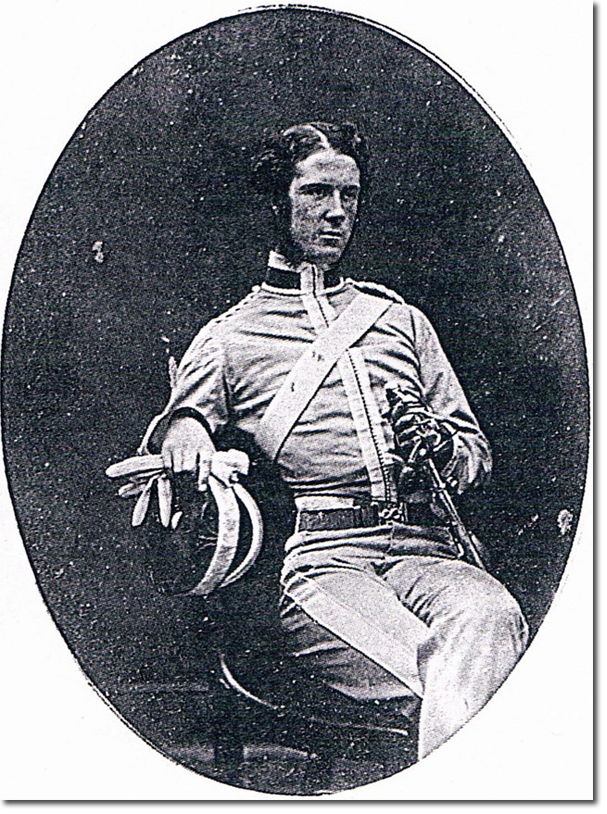
- Born: 5 June 1838
- Died: 10 May 1857 (aged 18); Meerut
- Military career
- Branch: 3rd Bengal Light Cavalry
- Rank: Cornet

John Campbell Erskine MacNabb (5 June 1838 - 10 May 1857) was a British junior officer with the 3rd Bengal Light Cavalry, based at Meerut, British India, and among the first Europeans to be killed in the Indian Rebellion of 1857. His unsent letter to his mother, discovered 38 years after his death, criticised Lieutenant-Colonel George M. Carmichael-Smyth's punishment of 85 men who refused to use the cartridges of the Enfield rifle which had recently been issued.

== Biography ==
John MacNab was born on 5 June 1838, the youngest son of James Monroe McNab, of the Bengal Civil Service, and his wife Jean Mary nee Campbell. In 1857, he was a recent arrival at Meerut, India. Before the uprising, he wrote to his mother expressing concern that Lieutenant-Colonel George M. Carmichael-Smyth's punishment of sepoys who refused the new cartridges was unjust. He was among the first Europeans killed during the Meerut uprising on 10 May, and news of his death was later conveyed to his mother by her son, James.

MacNab's letter to his mother stated:

My dear mother, I began writing this letter early as I have a great deal to write about. We have had a mutiny in this regiment, like several others, on the cartridge question. Of course you have heard in England that the 19th N.I. had refused to bite the greased cartridges, because they said they had pig's fat in them. The 19th are disbanded. Some other regiments made a fuss about it, so an order was issued that the men were to tear the top of the cartridge off with their fingers, instead of their teeth. Our Colonel Smyth most injudiciously ordered a parade of the skirmishers of the regiment to show them the new way of tearing the cartridges. I say injudiciously because there was no necessity to have the parade at all or to make any fuss of the sort just now, no other Colonel of Cavalry thought of doing such a thing, as they knew at this unsettled time their men would refuse to be the first to fire these cartridges, but that by not asking they would not give their men the chance of refusing, and that next parade season when the row had blown over they would begin to fire as a matter of course, and think nothing of it. But Colonel Smyth orders a parade at once. ...

== See also ==
- Hugh Gough
- William Greathed
