= Bert Abbott =

Bert Abbott may refer to:

- Bert Abbott (footballer)
- Bert Abbott (rugby union)
