= James Andrews =

James Andrews or Jim Andrews may refer to:

- James Pettit Andrews (1737–1797), English historian and antiquary
- James Andrews (botanical artist) (1801–1876), English botanical artist
- James Andrews (stonemason) (1828–1897), Scottish-American stonemason and engineer
- James J. Andrews (1829–1862), American Civil War spy
- Jim Andrews (1865–1907), American baseball player
- Jim Andrews (politician), American judge and state legislator
- Sir James Andrews, 1st Baronet (1877–1951), Lord Chief Justice of Northern Ireland
- James Andrews (clergyman) (1928–2006), American Presbyterian minister
- James J. Andrews (mathematician) (1930–1998), American mathematician
- James Andrews (physician) (born 1942), American surgeon, renowned practitioner of sports medicine
- James Andrews (musician) (born 1969), American musician
- James David Andrews (born 1992), American football player

== See also ==
- Jamie Andrews, British footballer
- James Andrews Grant (born 1937), Canadian lawyer
- James Andrew (disambiguation)
