= George Dodgson Callow =

British painter

George Dodgson Callow (1829–1875) was an English painter who specialized in landscapes and maritime water color painting.

== Life ==
Callow was born in Liverpool in 1829; according to the Parish Register of St Nicholas Church in Liverpool, he was christened on 20 April. He came from a large family of artists. His father, John Callow was also a painter as was his uncle William Callow and at least one of his brothers.

By 1861, Callow is recorded as living in London, at 82 Newman Street. He showed two paintings at the Royal Academy: Morning on the River Teign in 1863 and Coastal Scene, Isle of Wight in 1864. He appears to have specialised in landscapes and maritime painting.

He was married to Katherine Elston in 1866. The couple are not known to have had any children. He died in 1875.

His work is included in a number of public collections in the United Kingdom, including Middlesbrough Institute of Modern Art and Brighton and Hove Museum and Art Gallery.
