= James Andrew =

James Andrew may refer to:

- James Andrew (MP) (fl. 1410), MP for Ipswich
- James Osgood Andrew (1794–1871), American Bishop of the Methodist Episcopal Church and the Methodist Episcopal Church, South
- James Andrew (educator) (c. 1774–1833), Principal of the East India Military College at Croydon
- James Andrew (physician) (1829–1897), English physician, Fellow of the Royal College of Physicians

== See also ==
- James Andrews (disambiguation)
