= HMS Union (1756) =

Ship of the line of the Royal Navy

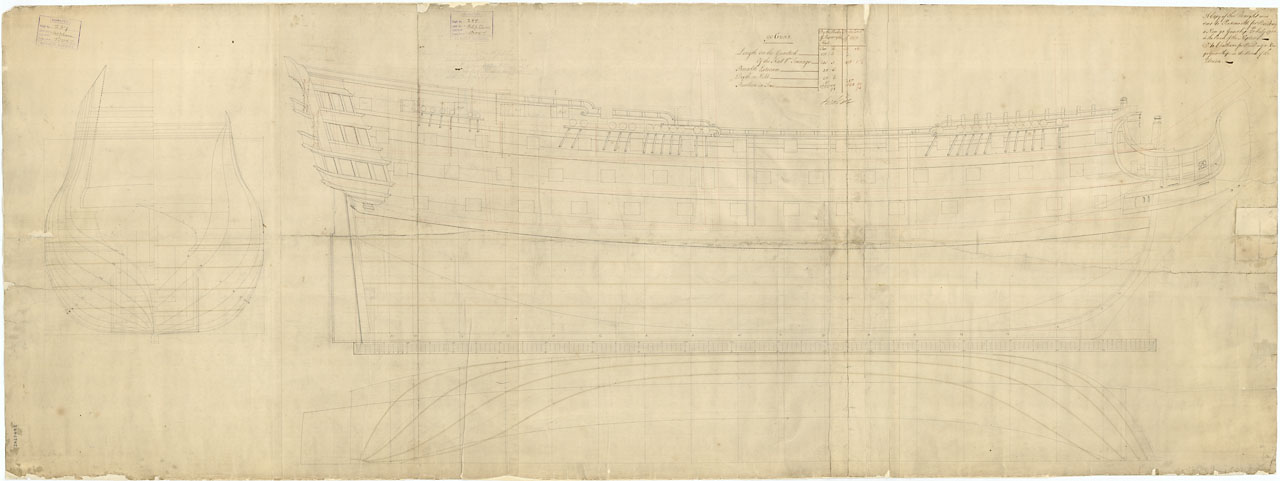
- Union original body plan

History

Great Britain
- Name: Union
- Ordered: 12 July 1750
- Builder: Chatham Dockyard
- Laid down: 5 June 1751
- Launched: 25 September 1756
- Commissioned: September 1756
- Fate: Broken up, October 1816

General characteristics
- Class & type: 90-gun second rate ship of the line
- Tons burthen: 1781
- Length: 171 ft (52.1 m) (gundeck)
- Beam: 48 ft 6 in (14.8 m)
- Depth of hold: 20 ft 6 in (6.2 m)
- Propulsion: Sails
- Sail plan: Full-rigged ship
- Armament: 90 guns: Gundeck: 26 × 32 pdrs; Middle gundeck: 26 × 18 pdrs; Upper gundeck: 26 × 12 pdrs; Quarterdeck: 10 × 6 pdrs; Forecastle: 2 × 6 pdrs

HMS Union was a 90-gun second rate ship of the line of the Royal Navy, built at Chatham Dockyard to the draught specified by the 1745 Establishment as amended in 1750, and launched on 25 September 1756.

In 1756, one of the midshipmen on the Union was John Hunter, later to become an admiral and the second Governor of New South Wales. On 1 August 1757 Arthur Phillip, who was to become the first Governor of New South Wales, joined the crew with the new commander.

The results (published in 1796) of an experiment made at the desire of the Lords Commissioners of the Admiralty, on board the Union hospital ship, to determine the effect of the nitrous acid in destroying contagion, and the safety with which it may be employed were given in a letter addressed to the Right Hon. Earl Spencer, by James Carmichael Smyth, M. D. F.R.S., Fellow of the Royal College of Physicians, and Physician Extraordinary to His Majesty, published with the approbation of the lords commissioners of the Admiralty.

In 1799, Union was converted to serve as a hospital ship.

In February 1802, she became a receiving ship and was renamed Sussex under Lieutenant John Rickman. In May 1807 Rickman was superseded by Lieutenant William Cockraft until she was paid off in Ordinary in March 1816. In October of that year she was broken up at Chatham.

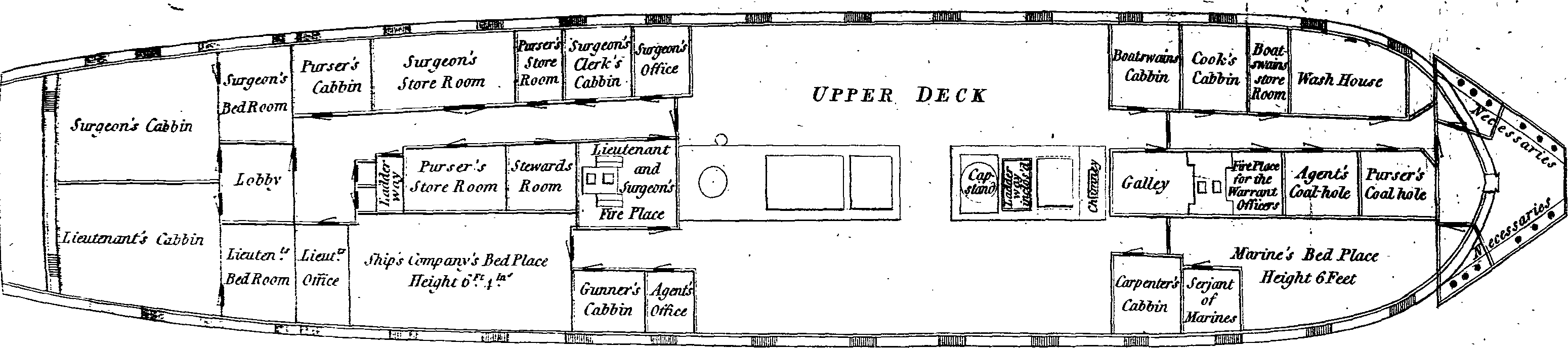
Union hospital ship, upper deck plan

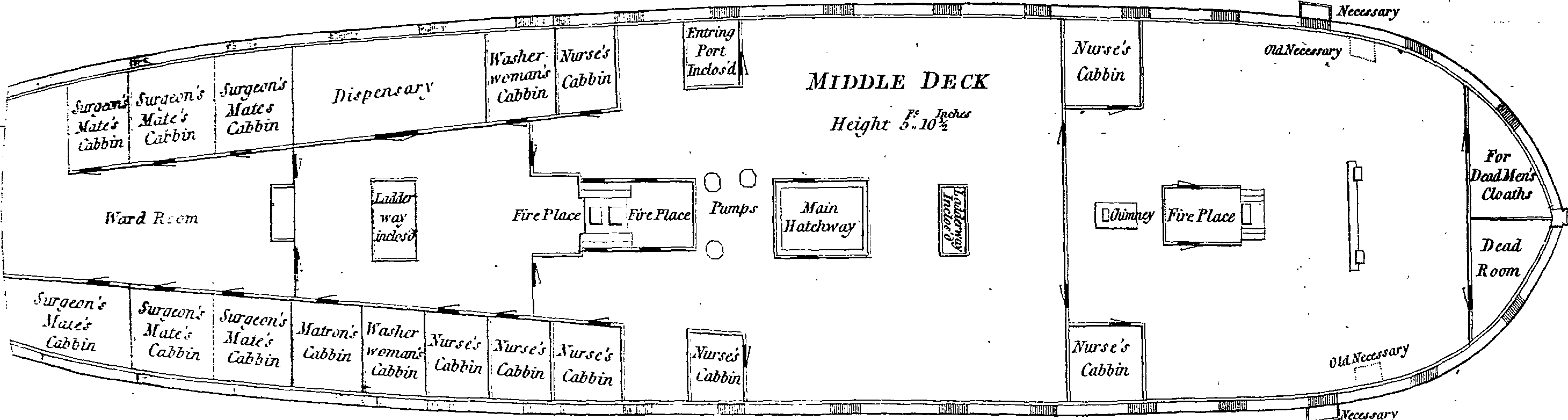
Hospital, middle deck plan
