= Frederick Edward Hadow =

Major-General Frederick Edward Hadow (28 October 1836 – 15 May 1915). He is notable for having served during the Indian mutiny and is believed to have been a senior Officer in the Hyderabad Contingency Force.

== Family background ==
Hadow was born in Hackney, Middlesex, England, the son of Charles Scott Hadow (1801–1849) and Marianne Sarah Abbott (1808–1887). Charles Hadow was a partner in Willis, Hadow and Co, wine merchants of Scot's Yard, Bush lane, London and also traded in India. Charles was the son of the Reverend James Hadow. Marianne Abbott was the sister of Major-General Herbert Edward Stacy Abbott.

His cousin Dr Gilbert Bethune Hadow was present at the siege of Lucknow.

== Military career ==
Frederick Edward Hadow attended the East India Company's Military Seminary at Addiscombe from 1852 to 1854. He was commissioned on 8 June 1854. He served during the Indian Mutiny with the Madras Artillery. He received the Indian Mutiny Medal (1857–1858) and was mentioned in dispatches. The Madras Artillery was part of the Honourable East India Company and for this reason Hadow's name is not included in British Army lists of recipients of the Indian Mutiny Medal. In 1861 the Madras Artillery was amalgamated with the Royal Artillery. During the mutiny, Lieutenant Hadow led an expedition to the rebel strongholds Khinda, Kudopali and Kolabira (about 40 km north of Sambalpur) looking for mutineers, but no trace of the rebels could be found. At Jharghati a little further on, the rebels offered some resistance. The artillery of the British won the day. The rebels suffered some casualty and dispersed. He was responsible for the destruction of the house of Zamindar Karunakar at Kolabira

He was made Lieutenant on 27 August 1858 and Captain on 24 May 1870. On 14 August 1889 he was made Major General and is believed to have been a senior officer in the Hyderabad Contingency Force based at Secunderabad.

== Personal life ==
He married Frances Emma Anderson (born 2 February 1839 at Scoonie, Fife and died 1 October 1883 at Harlech, Wales) on 17 April 1860. They had six children who survived infanthood. He then married Ethel Jane Howard (1862–1919) on 3 October 1888 and had a further 3 children.

== Retirement ==
Hadow retired from the army on 1 February 1892. He retired to Hereford, England and resided at Great Ethelbert House, Cantilupe Street. Here he served as Justice of the Peace. He died in Hereford on 15 May 1915.
