= 3rd Bengal Light Cavalry =

- Flag of the East India Company
- Active: 1797–1857
- Country: British India
- Allegiance: East India Company
- Branch: Bengal Army
- Type: Cavalry
- Role: Light cavalry
- Size: Regiment
- Part of: Meerut Division
- Garrison/HQ: Meerut
- Distinguishing colours: Orange facings
- Engagements: Second Anglo-Maratha War; First Anglo-Afghan War; First Anglo-Sikh War; Indian rebellion of 1857
- Battle honours: Delhi 1803; Leswarree; Deig; Bhurtpore; Affghanistan 1839; Ghuznee 1839; Aliwal; Sobraon

The 3rd Bengal Light Cavalry, also known as the 3rd Bengal Native Cavalry, was a locally recruited regiment of the East India Company's Bengal Army. Raised in 1797, the regiment took part in conflicts throughout British India, serving with distinction in the Second Anglo-Maratha War, the First Anglo-Afghan War and the First Anglo-Sikh War, earning various battle honours.

In April 1857, 85 men of the regiment refused to accept cartridges for their carbines and were tried by court-martial, convicted, and sentenced to up to 10 years' hard labour. After the men were imprisoned, the regiment freed their jailed comrades and headed to Delhi, where their arrival led to the outbreak of the Indian Mutiny. Following the events of the mutiny, all the Bengal Light Cavalry regiments were disbanded.

== History ==
On 7 January 1796, the board of directors of the East India Company instructed the Governor-General John Shore to raise four 465-strong regiments of native cavalry for its Bengal Army. Consequently, in 1797, the 3rd Bengal Native Cavalry was raised in Oude by Captain John P. Pigot. At first, the terms "Bengal Native Cavalry" and "Bengal Light Cavalry" were used interchangeably, but by 1857 the regiment was referred to as the 3rd Bengal Light Cavalry in official paperwork.

The regiment served with distinction during the Second Anglo-Maratha War, taking part in the Battle of Delhi and the Battle of Laswari in 1803, as part of a force commanded by General Gerard Lake against the forces of Maharaja Daulat Rao Sindhia; for their service during this campaign, the regiment was awarded an Honorary Standard bearing the inscription "Lake and Victory" and an extra Jemadar. The regiment earned the "Delhi 1803", "Leswarree" and "Deig" battle honours during this campaign.

The 3rd Bengal Light Cavalry was present throughout the Siege of Bharatpur (December 1825 – January 1826) as part of a cavalry brigade, taking part in the final assault on the fortress and earning the "Bhurtpore" battle honour. The regiment also took part in the 1839 First Anglo-Afghan War, participating in the Battle of Ghazni, earning the "Affghanistan 1839" and "Ghuznee 1839" battle honours. During the 1845–1846 First Anglo-Sikh War, the regiment fought in the Battle of Aliwal and the Battle of Sobraon and was awarded battle honours for both.

== Meerut ==
In 1857, the regiment had been stationed in Meerut for three years, forming part of the Meerut Division under Major General William Henry Hewitt. The East India Company planned to supply its locally recruited "Native" regiments with the Pattern 1853 Enfield rifle during that year, accompanied by a new type of ammunition that came in the form of a greased paper cartridge. The standard drill (or formal procedure) for loading this ammunition required the user to bite the paper cartridge to open it. Rumours began to circulate within the Bengal Presidency that the grease for the cartridges was made from a mix of lard from pigs and tallow from cows, and was therefore taboo to both Hindu and Muslim sepoy alike. These rumours reached Lieutenant Colonel George M. Carmichael-Smyth, in temporary command of the regiment, while he was on leave in Mussoorie. On his return to Meerut, Carmichael-Smyth received orders for the new drill, which applied to all weapons currently in use including those which did not take the new form of ammunition. Carmichael-Smyth modified the drill so that cartridges would be torn by hand, rather than biting.

On 23 April, Carmichael-Smyth announced a parade for the following day, during which the men of the regiment would be taught the new drill, using the muskets and ammunition which they had been using for years, rather than the new rifles or ammunition. During that evening, the men decided that they would not accept the cartridges; some approached a junior officer directly, and when they were told that none of the new cartridges were being used, they stated that using any type of cartridge would "lay themselves open to the imputation from their comrades and from other regiments of having fired the objectionable ones." These concerns were communicated to Carmichael-Smyth, who decided that the parade would go ahead as planned; during the night, Carmichael-Smyth's tent and some buildings were destroyed by fire. The following morning, 90 men, the regiment's carabiniers or skirmishers, were lined up to carry out the new parade drill using blank ammunition. When Carmichael-Smyth arrived at the parade ground, he found that no man had taken their ammunition, and he ordered the Havildar Major to carry out the drill. There was then an attempt to distribute the cartridges to the rest of the carabiniers but this was refused, despite a speech from Carmichael-Smyth reminding the men that the cartridges were the type they had been using for years. Out of 90 men, 85 refused the order to accept the ammunition.

Hewitt convened a Court of Inquiry, judged by Indian officers, to investigate the events. The inquiry found that the ammunition issued to the men was of the same type the men previously used, and was in fact manufactured under the supervision of one of the five men who had accepted his ammunition during the parade. During the inquiry, only one man expressed a concern regarding the greased cartridges; the wider concerns of the men were based on the perceived stigma that they would face if they had accepted the ammunition. The inquiry found that the men had no reasonable cause, and no religious grounds, to refuse to accept the cartridges. A court martial was ordered, again composed entirely of Indian officers (six Muslim, nine Hindu), and this took place over a three-day period with each of the 85 men giving a plea of "not guilty". The men were found guilty, by 14 of 15 officers, of disobeying orders, and were sentenced to 10 years' hard labour. The judges asked Hewitt to take into consideration the fact that the men were of good character and had been misled, but this was ignored as Hewitt felt there had been no expression of remorse. Eleven of the men, the youngest, had their sentences reduced from 10 to 5 years, but sentences of the remaining men were confirmed on 8 May.

At 05:00 on 9 May 1857, a parade of the entire Meerut Division took place, to announce the sentences of the convicted men. The troops present included the 60th Rifles, 6th Dragoon Guards, and batteries of Bengal Artillery, as well as the 11th Regiment of Bengal Native Infantry, the 20th Regiment of Bengal Native Infantry and, dismounted, the remainder of the men of the 3rd Bengal Light Cavalry. The sentences were read, and the men stripped of their uniforms, then placed in shackles, while the Meerut Division watched. Despite pleas from the condemned men, none of their fellow soldiers came to their assistance. The entire process took around two hours to complete, following which the convicted soldiers were handed over to the civilian authorities and taken to the local jail under armed escort. After the parade, Hewitt communicated to his headquarters that all was calm, but during the night various junior officials received warnings of impending trouble from concerned sepoys or members of their household staff.

== Mutiny ==
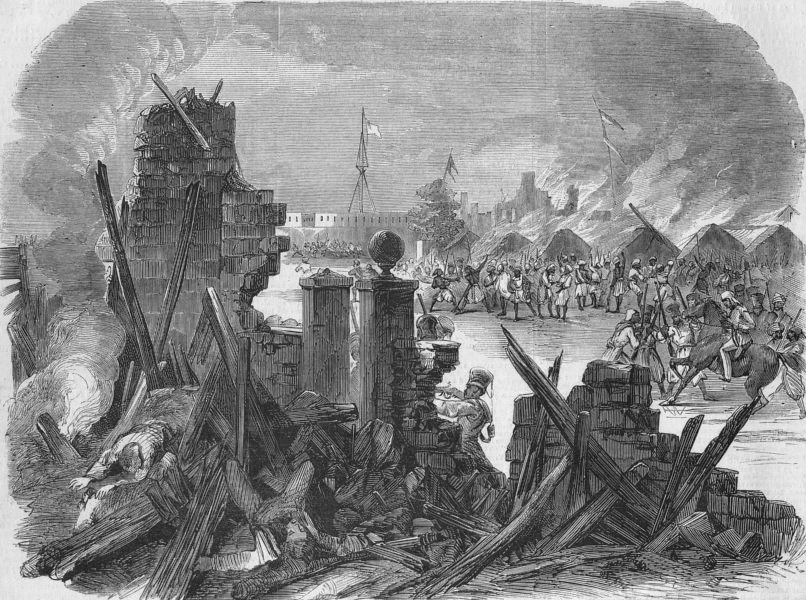
"The Sepoy revolt at Meerut," from the Illustrated London News, 1857

The following day, a Sunday, at around 18:00, a general disturbance was reported in the town bazaar and columns of smoke were seen, rising from burning buildings. The 60th Rifles were waiting outside the local church, ready to attend a service, which had been delayed by half an hour on account of unusually warm weather; the sound of gunfire from the town alerted them to trouble. They headed to their own barracks, armed themselves, and were on their parade square awaiting orders when they were attacked by mounted troopers from the 3rd Bengal Light Cavalry. Upon finding the 60th Rifles unexpectedly armed and waiting for them, the troopers rode away, headed directly to the jail and released their comrades with the help of a local blacksmith. At the same time, soldiers from the 11th and 20th Regiments of Bengal Native Infantry were mutinying, killing some of their officers and some civilians (while helping some of their officers and officers' families to escape), and burning a number of buildings within the town. One company of the 60th Rifles was ordered to guard the treasury, a second company was ordered to guard their barracks, and the remainder of the 60th Rifles, joined by the 6th Dragoon Guards, headed to the barracks of the Native Infantry regiments. When they arrived, they found the buildings ablaze and the area deserted. Hewitt, concerned about the possibility of attack, withdrew the troops back toward their barracks and encamped them nearby. Throughout the mutiny and subsequent rioting, one troop consisting of between 80 and 90 members of the 3rd Bengal Light Cavalry remained loyal to their officers. The mutinying soldiers from the 3rd Bengal Light Cavalry, having released their comrades from the jail, returned to Meerut and joined in with the rioting along with members of the local civilian population, and then the mutineers from all three regiments left, heading to Delhi, although the fact that they had left Meerut was not discovered by the military authorities until the following morning and they did not know the direction in which the mutineers had departed.

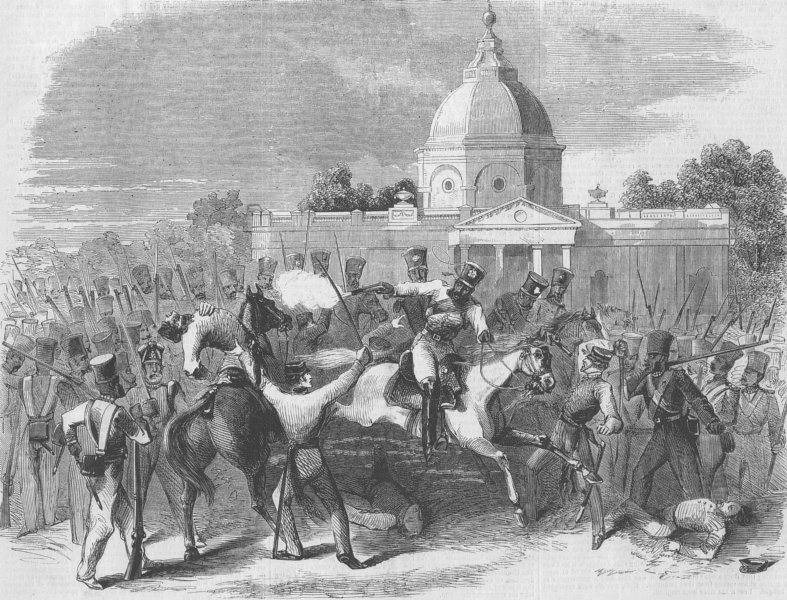
"Indian Mutiny: Massacre of officers by insurgent cavalry at Delhi," from the Illustrated London News, 1857

At approximately 09:00 on 11 May, a small body of cavalry, followed by a larger body in the distance, was seen approaching Delhi along the road between that city and Meerut. The East India Company employees immediately noted that this was unusual, and the senior military officers present within the city attempted to contact Meerut by telegraph to enquire about the approaching troops, but the telegraph line between Delhi and Meerut appeared to have been cut. The 54th Regiment of Bengal Native Infantry, one of three Bengal Native Infantry regiments garrisoned within Delhi's Red Fort, was ordered to intercept them. A party of East India Company civil servants went to secure the fort's Calcutta Gate, but when they arrived they found that troopers from the 3rd Bengal Light Cavalry had already taken control of it. A struggle ensued which led to the death of a cavalry trooper and a civilian. A small group of troopers from the regiment headed toward the city's jail and released the inmates, meeting with no resistance. The main body of the regiment then arrived, joining up with the party at the Calcutta Gate, and then collectively they entered the fort and attacked the civilians within. A small group from the advance party gained access to the private courtyard of Bahadur Shah II and told him that he should take command of them. The regiment spread out throughout the fort and the city, and was eventually joined in mutiny by the forces of Bahadur Shah II and members of the Bengal Native Infantry who were based within the fort; a widespread outbreak of looting, burning of buildings and murder of East India Company employees and civilian shopkeepers took place, and the Indian Mutiny began in earnest. The mutineers of the 3rd Bengal Light Cavalry remained at Delhi until the breaking of the Siege of Delhi in September 1857. They withdrew first to Lucknow, then later to Nepal, where the majority of the men died through combat, disease or starvation. Those that eventually managed to make their way back to their homes found themselves shunned by their communities for their part in the mutiny. The regiment itself, in common with every other regiment of Bengal Light Cavalry, was disbanded at the end of the Indian Mutiny.

== Historical perspective ==
The way the situation had been handled was subject to criticism; firstly, the choice by Carmichael-Smyth to hold the firing drill parade was immediately criticised by his superior, Hewitt, who felt that had the parade not been held, the issue with the cartridges "would have blown over." Furthermore, a junior officer from Carmichael-Smyth's regiment, Lieutenant John Campbell MacNabb, felt that the drill parade was unnecessary and stated that the dislike held by the men toward their commanding officer was an aggravating factor in the events that followed. When Hewitt informed the Commander in Chief, Major General George Anson, about the public nature of the men's sentence, and of placing them in irons in front of the entire Meerut Division, on 9 May, Anson confirmed the sentences but did not approve of the "unusual procedure" that Hewitt had followed. For his conduct on 10 May, Hewitt later faced criticism from Lieutenant General Sir Patrick Grant, (who was the acting Commander in Chief by that point, following Anson's death) and from John Lawrence (who was then Commissioner of Punjab province). Following the mutiny of the troops at Meerut, Hewitt's command of the Meerut Division was taken away. At a subsequent appeal, Hewitt and his immediate subordinate, Brigadier General Archdale Wilson of the Bengal Artillery, blamed each other for the way the situation unfolded; Hewitt said that Wilson was responsible for the tactics on the day, and Wilson stated that as Hewitt was the overall commander, responsibility lay with him; Hewitt lost the appeal. The historian Kim A. Wagner, in his 2010 book The Great Fear of 1857, stated that the senior officers' fear of "making a 'wrong decision'" led them to make no decision at all, "with devastating results".

Field Marshal Frederick Roberts, in his 1897 book Forty-one Years in India, gave an opposing view; Roberts stated that he doubted "whether anything would have been gained" by an attempt to pursue the mutineers as the cavalry available (the 6th Dragoon Guards) was at that time composed mainly of recruits with horses that had not yet been broken and it was impractical to follow the mutineers with either infantry or artillery. Roberts went on to say "after careful consideration of all the circumstances of the revolt at Meerut, I have come to the conclusion that it would have been futile to have sent the small body of mounted troops available in pursuit of the mutineers on the night of the 10th May, and that, considering the state of feeling throughout the Native army, no action, however prompt, on the part of the Meerut authorities could have arrested the Mutiny. The sepoys had determined to throw off their allegiance to the British Government, and the when and the how were merely questions of time and opportunity." The actions of the 3rd Bengal Light Cavalry themselves were described by Major Agha Amin, writing for Defence Journal, as "a coup d'état and an outstanding example of initiative and courage."

== See also ==
- Causes of the Indian Rebellion of 1857
