= Jonathan Cape (mathematician) =

English mathematician and cleric

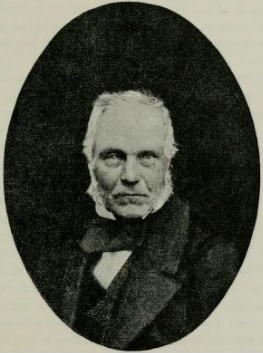
Jonathan Cape

Jonathan Cape FRS (1793 – 9 September 1868) was a mathematician and Church of England clergyman.

== Life ==
Cape was born in 1793 in Uldale, Cumberland (now Cumbria), the eldest son of the Rev. Joseph Cape (d. 1830). He was admitted to Trinity College, Cambridge, in 1812 as a sizar, graduating with a BA in 1816 (5th Wrangler) and MA in 1821. He was ordained deacon in 1816 by the Bishop of Salisbury (acting for the Bishop of Winchester), and priest by the Bishop of Salisbury in 1818.

He was appointed Assistant Professor at the Royal Naval Academy, Portsmouth (a post which he held with the curacy of St George's, Portsea) in 1816, before being appointed in 1822 Senior Professor of Mathematics at Addiscombe Seminary, Croydon, Surrey. He held this post until the closure of the institution in 1861. H. M. Vibart's history of Addiscombe contains anecdotal material about Cape, commenting that he was perhaps "the most remarkable member of the staff of the College during the whole course of its existence ... He was Addiscombe ... from its commencement until its end 40 years after."

Cape was noted for his dry, sarcastic wit, and for his strong Northumbrian accent, as well as being "an excellent teacher and disciplinarian, with a keen sense of humour". He was appointed Fellow of the Royal Society in 1852 for his mathematical publications. He retired on a very substantial pension, and died – a convivial bachelor – at Croydon on 9 September 1868 aged 75, leaving £12,000.

== Publications ==
- Mathematical Tables ... (Croydon,1838; 3rd edition London, 1860).
- A Course of Mathematics Principally Designed for the Use of Students in the East India Company's Seminary at Addiscombe. (London, 1850). 2 volumes.

== Bibliography ==
- "Cape, Jonathan (1816–1833)". The Clergy of the Church of England Database 1540–1835. CCEd Person ID 53112.
- Boase, F., 1892/1965: Modern English Biography, volume 1, p 539
- Venn, J. A., 1940/2001: Alumni Cantabrigiensis. Part Two, volume 1, p 507
- Vibart, H. M. (1894). Addiscombe: Its Heroes and Men of Note. Westminster: Archibald Constable. pp. 80–83. OL 23336661M.
