= Sir James Carmichael-Smyth, 1st Baronet =

British colonial administrator and army officer

Major-General Sir James Carmichael-Smyth Bt KCH CB
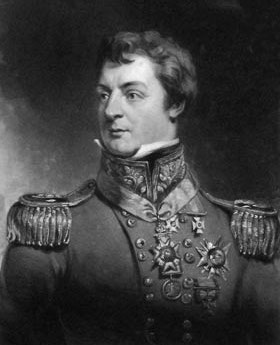
- Born: 22 February 1779; London, England
- Died: 4 March 1838 (aged 59); Georgetown, British Guiana
- Military career
- Allegiance: United Kingdom
- Branch: British Army
- Rank: Major-General
- Conflicts: War of the Sixth Coalition; Peninsular War; Waterloo Campaign

Major-General Sir James Carmichael-Smyth, 1st Baronet, KCH, CB (22 February 1779 – 4 March 1838) was a British Army officer and colonial administrator.

== Biography ==
=== Early life and family ===
Carmichael-Smyth was born in London the eldest son of Scottish physician and medical writer, James Carmichael Smyth and Mary Holyland. His younger brother Henry Carmichael-Smyth, would achieve distinction as an officer serving the East India Company and for being the step-father of William Makepeace Thackeray.

Carmichael Smyth married Harriet Morse, daughter of Robert Morse, on 28 May 1816 and they had one son.

=== Career ===
He was educated at Charterhouse School and the Royal Military Academy in Woolwich, London before joining the Royal Engineers in March 1795 as a second lieutenant. One of the chief engineering officers of the British Army in Southern Africa between 1795 and 1808, he then went to Spain under Lieutenant-general Sir John Moore in 1808–9. From 1813 to 1815 he was stationed in the Low Countries and was present at the ill-fated Siege of Bergen op Zoom in 1814 before going on to command the Royal Corps of Engineers & Sappers at Waterloo. Prior to the battle, Smyth had created a plan of the ground that allowed Wellington to place his troops rapidly and advantageously.

In 1818, he was on Wellington's staff at the Board of Ordnance. He was made a baronet in August 1821 on Wellington's recommendation. He was sent by Wellington in 1823 to survey the defences in the Low Countries and the British West Indies and in 1825 to repeat the operation in British North America. He was promoted major-general in May 1825 and, after carrying out some engineering works in Ireland, was made Governor of the Bahamas in May 1829. In June 1833, he was transferred to be Governor of British Guiana, where he had to deal with issues related to the emancipation of slaves.

Between 1815 and 1831, he had published eight volumes on the subjects of military engineering, defence, and slavery.

=== Death ===
He died of an illness on 4 March 1838 in Georgetown, Guiana and his son James Robert Carmichael became the second baronet.

== Notes ==
Government offices
Preceded by Lewis Grant	Governor of the Bahamas; 1829–1833	Succeeded by Blayney Balfour
Preceded by Sir Benjamin d'Urban	Governor of British Guiana; 1833–1838	Succeeded by Henry Light
Baronetage of the United Kingdom
New creation	Baronet (of Nutwood); 1821–1838	Succeeded by James Robert Carmichael
