= Addiscombe Military Seminary =

East India Company military academy

Coordinates: 51.37693°N 0.07947°W

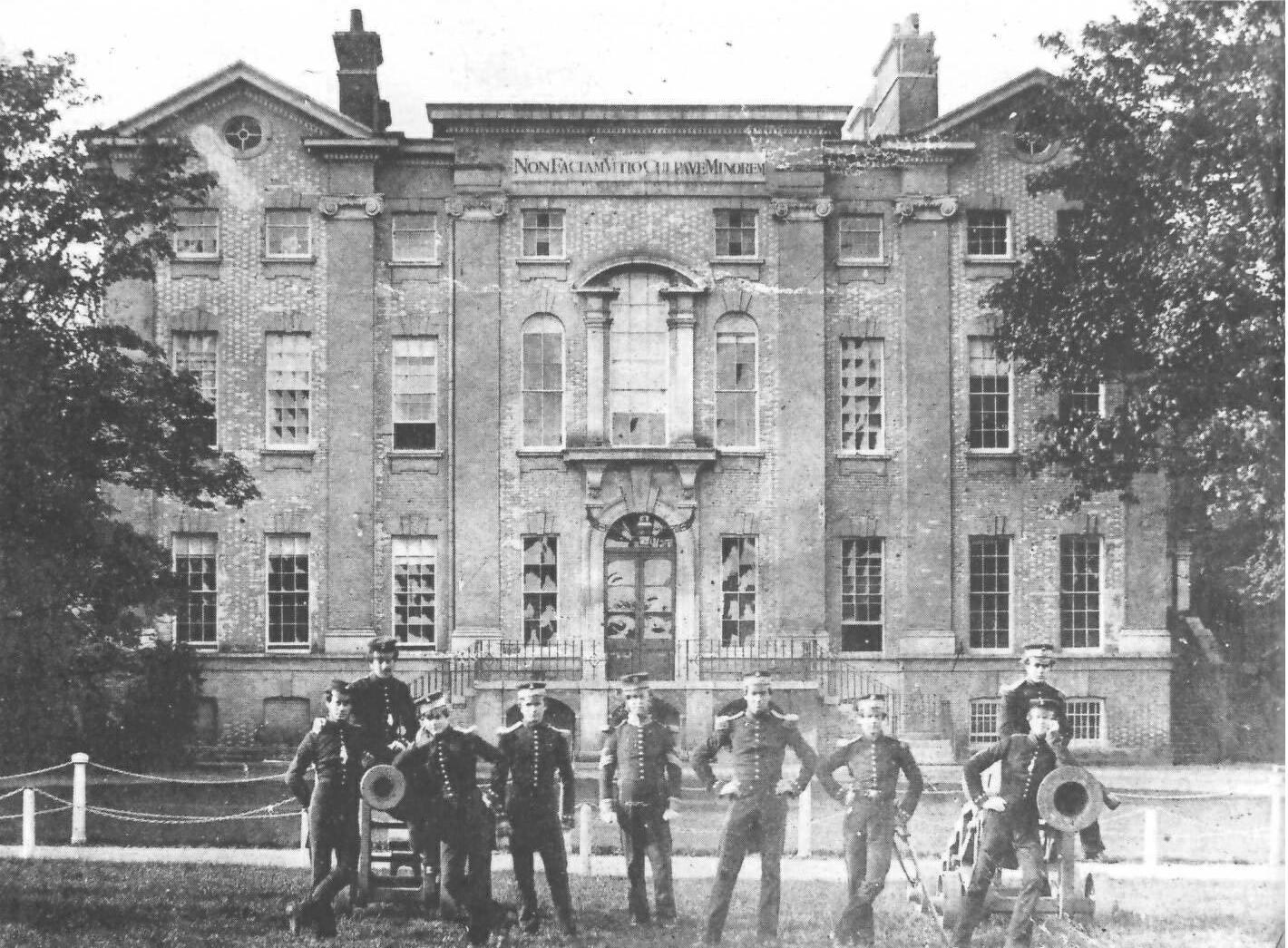
- East front of Addiscombe Place, the main building of Addiscombe Seminary, photographed c. 1859. Cadets pose in the foreground. The inscription Non faciam vitio culpave minorem can be seen on the entablature
- Active: 1809–1861
- Country: United Kingdom
- Branch: British Army
- Type: Training
- Role: Army Officer Training
- Garrison/HQ: Addiscombe, Surrey

The East India Company Military Seminary was a British military academy at Addiscombe, Surrey, in what is now the London Borough of Croydon. It opened in 1809 and closed in 1861. Its purpose was to train young officers to serve in the East India Company's own army in India.

The institution was formally known as the East India Company Military Seminary (a name the cadets always disliked) until 1855, when the name was changed to the East India Company Military College. In 1858, when the college was taken over by the government, it was renamed the Royal India Military College. Colloquially, it was known as Addiscombe Seminary, Addiscombe College, or Addiscombe Military Academy.

The Seminary was a sister institution to the East India Company College in Hertfordshire, which trained civilian "writers" (clerks). In military terms it was a counterpart to the Royal Military Academy at Woolwich and the Royal Military College at Sandhurst.

== History ==
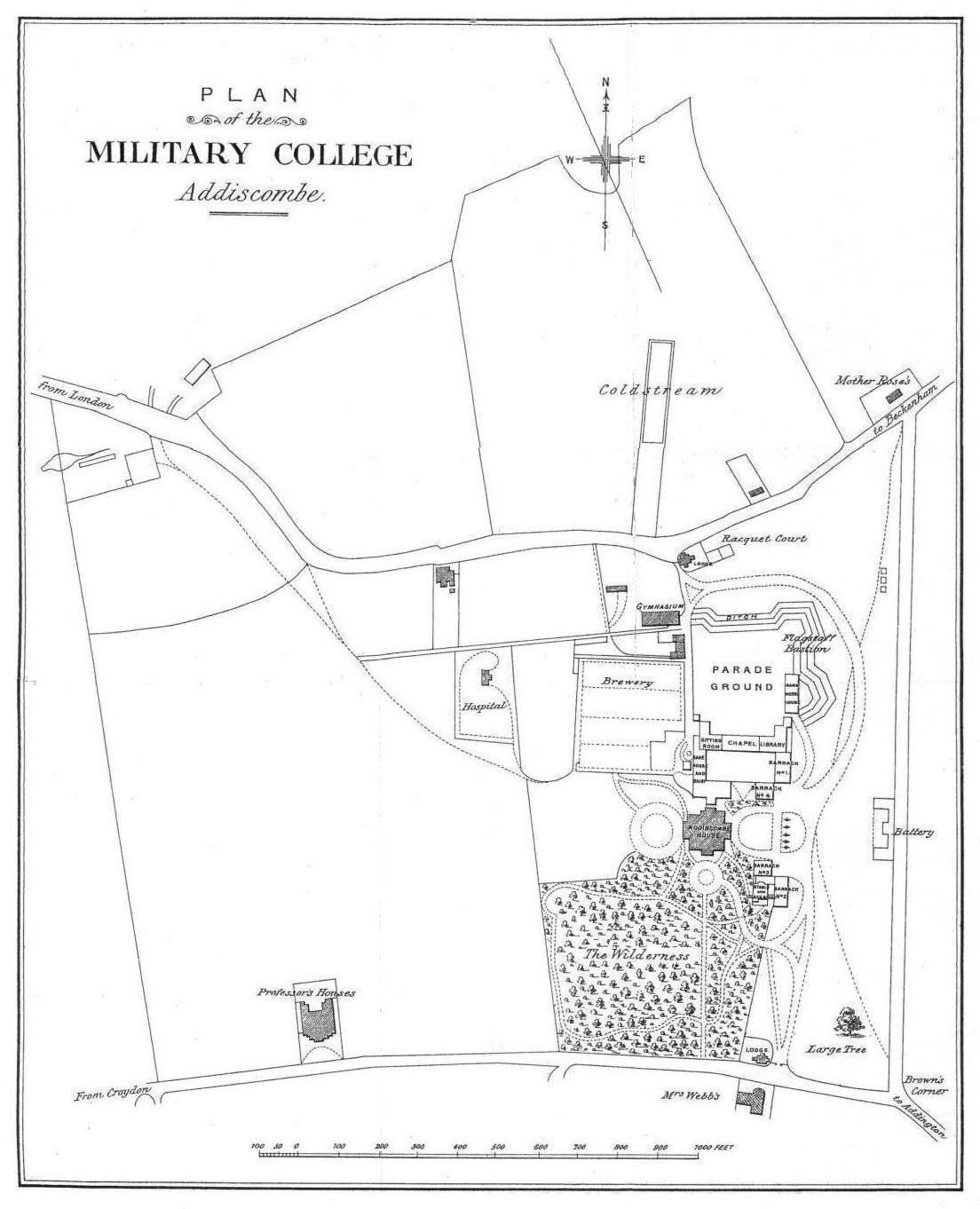
Plan of the Seminary grounds

=== Addiscombe Place ===
Addiscombe Place, the mansion house which formed the central building of the later Seminary, was erected in about 1702 by William Draper, on land which he had inherited in 1700 from his aunt, Dame Sarah Temple. Draper's father-in-law was the diarist John Evelyn, who in 1703 pronounced the house "in all points of good and solid architecture to be one of the very best gentleman's houses in Surrey, when finish'd". Its interior included many mural paintings of mythological subjects, supposed to be the work of Sir James Thornhill; while high up on the exterior east front was carved the Latin inscription, Non faciam vitio culpave minorem ("I will not lower myself by vice or fault"). By the late 18th century the house was in the ownership of Charles James Clarke, who leased it to the statesman Charles Jenkinson, Lord Hawkesbury, later 1st Earl of Liverpool. Regular visitors during Liverpool's tenure included King George III and William Pitt.

=== The military seminary ===
Following the death of Lord Liverpool in December 1808, Addiscombe Place was put on the market by Emelius Delmé-Radcliffe (Clarke's brother-in-law). It was bought by the Court of Directors of the East India Company for use as a military academy. Although the company was primarily a trading concern, it also maintained its own army, the officers of which had previously been trained at the Royal Military Academy, Woolwich, at the Royal Military College Junior Department at Great Marlow, or privately. They were now to be trained at Addiscombe. The Seminary opened on 21 January 1809, although the formal transfer of title of the property did not take place until a year later, on 26 January 1810.

The initial purchase comprised the mansion house and 58 acres of land to the south of Lower Addiscombe Road, but a further 30 acres to the north were subsequently acquired. New buildings were added, so that the mansion house, which originally housed the entire establishment, became a purely administrative block. The additions included barracks, a chapel, a drawing and lecture hall, a hospital, a dining-hall, a sand-modelling hall, a gymnasium, and service facilities including a bakehouse, dairy, laundry, and brew-house.

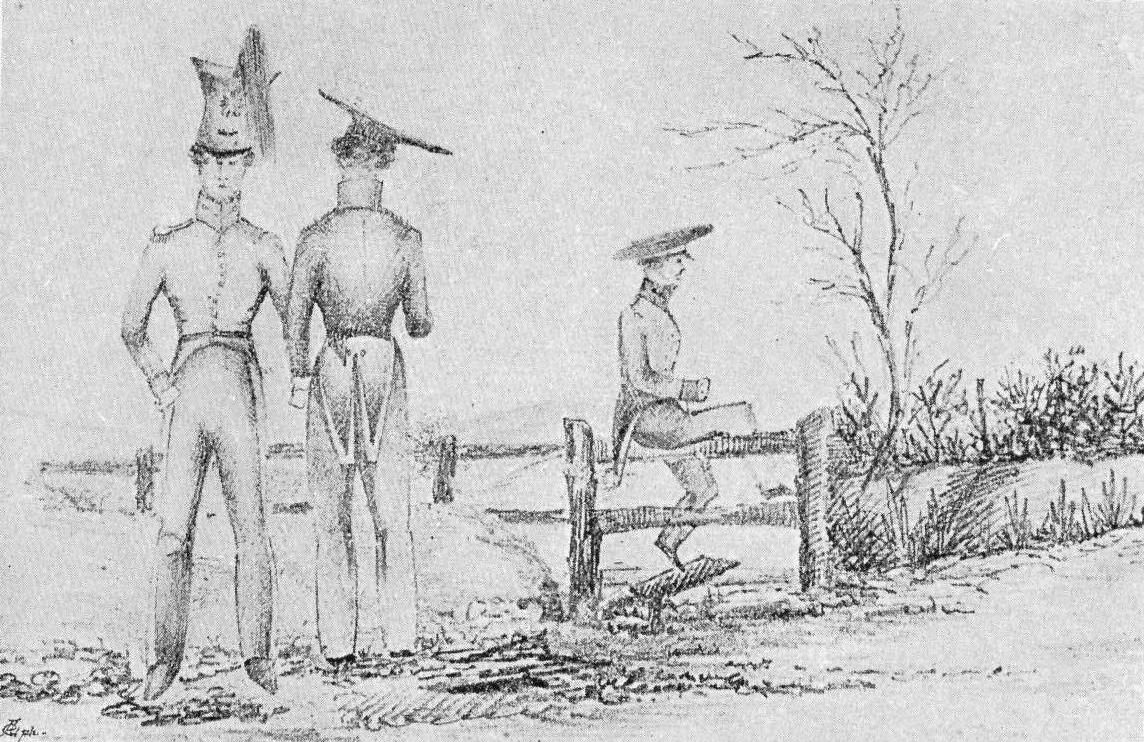
Addiscombe cadets sketched by fellow cadet George Girdwood Channer in 1826–27

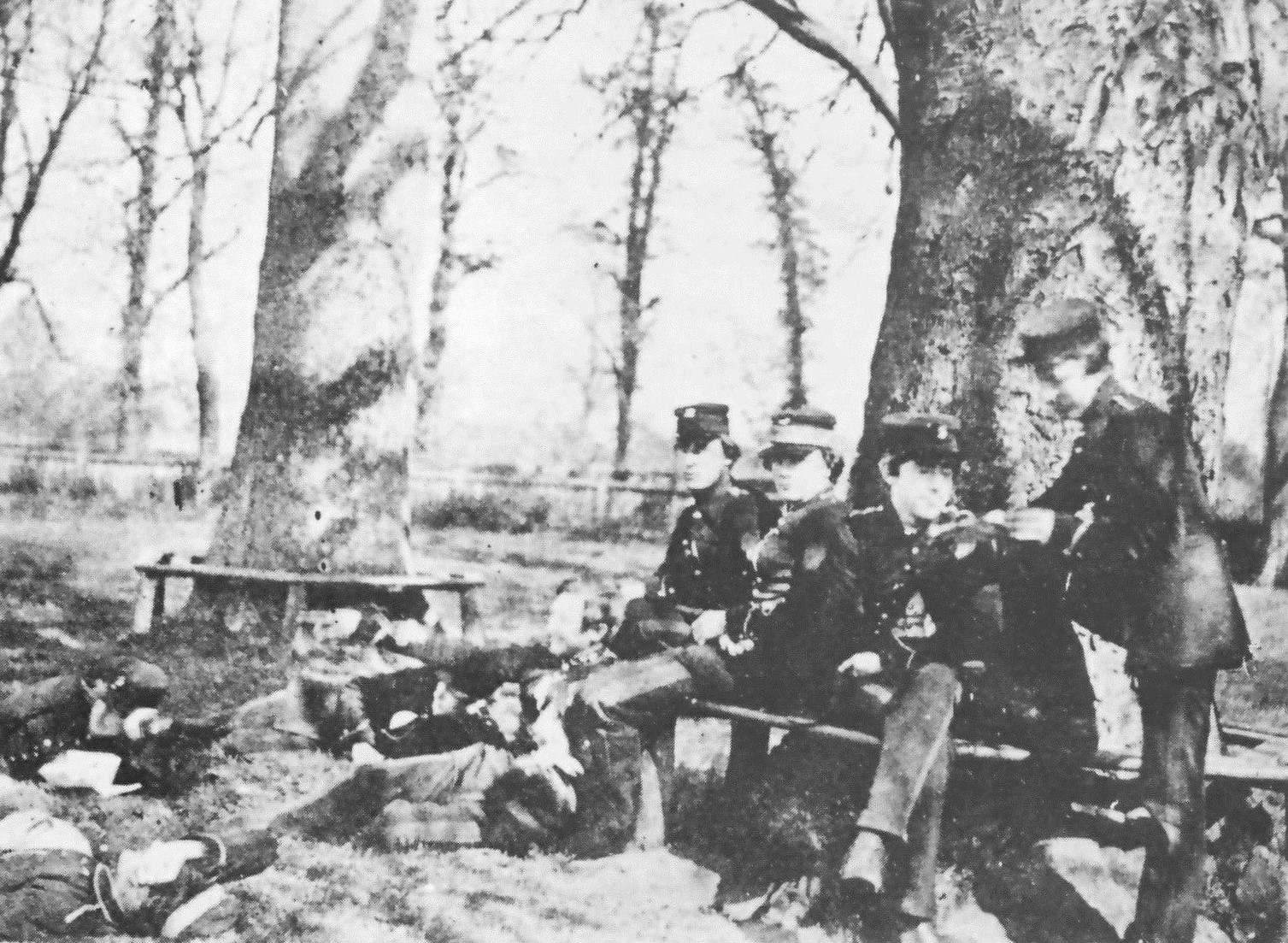
Addiscombe cadets photographed in c.1858

=== Cadets and the curriculum ===
In the early days cadets entered the Seminary between the ages of 13 1/2 and 16, and later between 15 and 18. They normally remained for 2 years (4 terms), although it was possible to pass the final examination within a shorter period. The initial intake comprised 60 cadets, but numbers rose to about 75 a year, meaning that there were around 150 cadets in residence at any one time. Cadets or their families were required to pay fees (£30 a year when the Seminary first opened; £50 a term by 1835), but these were heavily subsidised and represented only a proportion of the true costs of their education.

Initially, the main purpose of the Seminary was to train cadets for the Engineer or Artillery arms of the service, but as an experiment in 1816–17, and more permanently from 1827, "general service" cadets destined for the Infantry were admitted. In all, some 3,600 cadets passed through Addiscombe during the years of its existence. Of these, over 500 entered the Engineers, nearly 1,100 the Artillery, and about 2,000 the Infantry, some of whom subsequently transferred to the Cavalry.

The curriculum comprised instruction in the "sciences of Mathematics, Fortification, Natural Philosophy, and Chemistry; the Hindustani, Latin, and French languages; in the art of Civil, Military, and Lithographic Drawing and Surveying; and in the construction of the several gun-carriages and mortar-beds used in the Artillery service, from the most approved models". The Company paid well, and attracted some distinguished academic staff: John Shakespear published a standard Hindustani grammar, and Jonathan Cape was a Fellow of the Royal Society. In practice, the emphasis was on mathematics, and the Seminary was criticised for not including more training in practical "military science". In the 1850s photography was also studied. J. M. Bourne concludes that the Seminary was "not a true military college at all, but a militarised public school" – although he also judges that, by the standards of the age, its record as a military training school was not significantly worse than those of the establishments at Woolwich and Sandhurst.

Cadets were required to wear uniforms at all times, and were not permitted to go beyond the grounds or into Croydon without permission. However, they gained a reputation for indiscipline, and fights with the townspeople of Croydon were not infrequent. There was no corporal punishment, but in the early years, cadets could be punished by being incarcerated in the so-called "Black Hole", and fed on bread and water. Until 1829 they worshipped regularly at Croydon Parish Church (marching there each Sunday in uniform, accompanied by their band): after that date they began to worship at the newly consecrated St James's Church, Addiscombe.

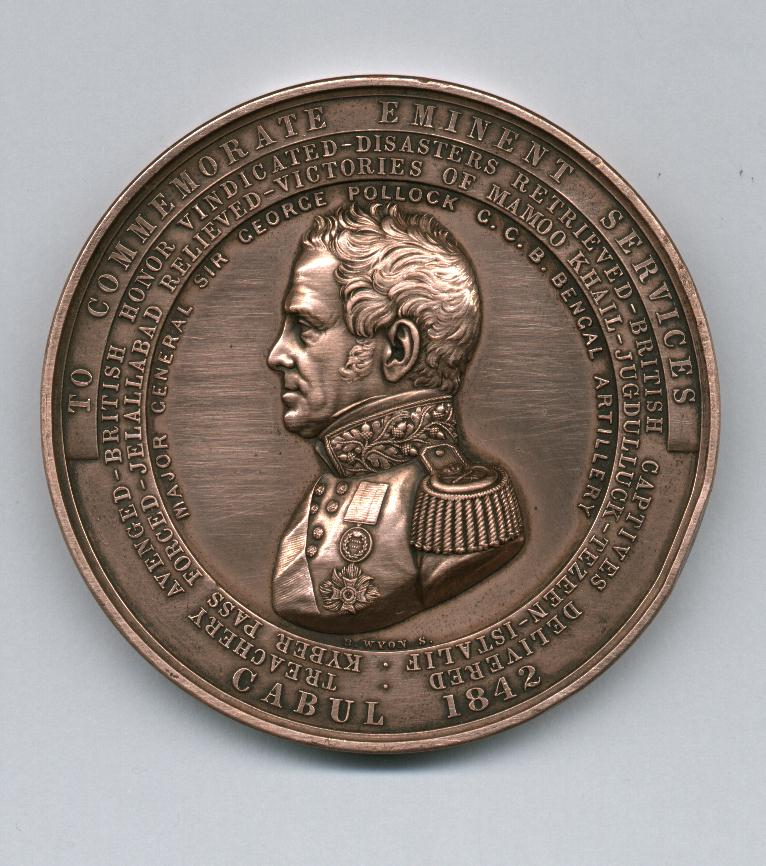
The original Pollock Medal (obverse)

=== Public Examinations and Pollock Medal ===
Examinations were held twice-yearly in June and December: they lasted about three weeks, and culminated in a Public Examination, a day-long affair of some ceremony before a distinguished invited audience, which included orchestrated demonstrations of book-learning and of military exercises such as swordsmanship and pontoon-building; an exhibition of drawings and models; a formal inspection; and the distribution of prizes. The day's events are described in one account as "a performance carefully prepared and rehearsed beforehand. Its object was to make a favourable impression on a carefully selected audience". The Public Examiner, who presided, was an eminent general (see list below); while the audience usually included some of the Directors of the East India Company, and often the Archbishop of Canterbury, who had a residence nearby at Addington Palace.

In 1848 the Seminary began awarding the Pollock Medal to the best cadet of the training season. The award was named after Field Marshal Sir George Pollock. The Pollock Prize was transferred to the Royal Military Academy, Woolwich after Addiscombe was closed.

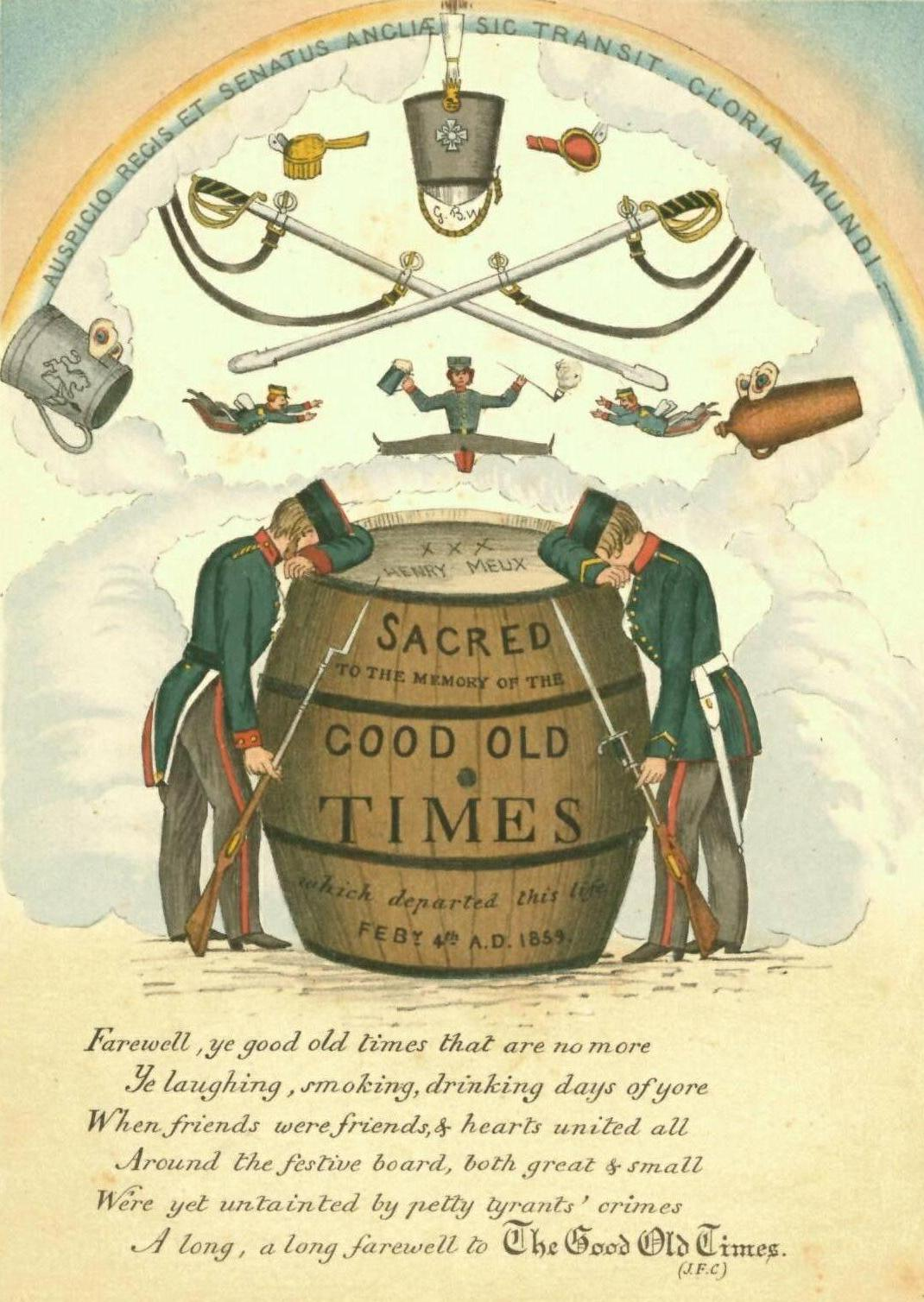
Nostalgic cartoon by Cadet George B. Wymer, and poem by Cadet John F. Cookesley, marking their passing out from Addiscombe in 1859. The cadets' uniforms are: (left) the tailed coatee in use until 1858; (right) the tunic introduced in that year. Frontispiece to H.M. Vibart, Addiscombe: its heroes and men of note (1894)

=== Closure and development of the site ===
Following the Indian Rebellion of 1857, the East India Company was wound up in 1858. The college passed into government hands, becoming known as the Royal Indian Military College, Addiscombe, but continued to perform much the same function. With the amalgamation of the Royal and Indian services in 1861, there was initially a proposal that Addiscombe should be retained as a military college. However, the War Office decided that the establishments at Woolwich and Sandhurst were sufficient for their needs, and the college closed in June the same year.

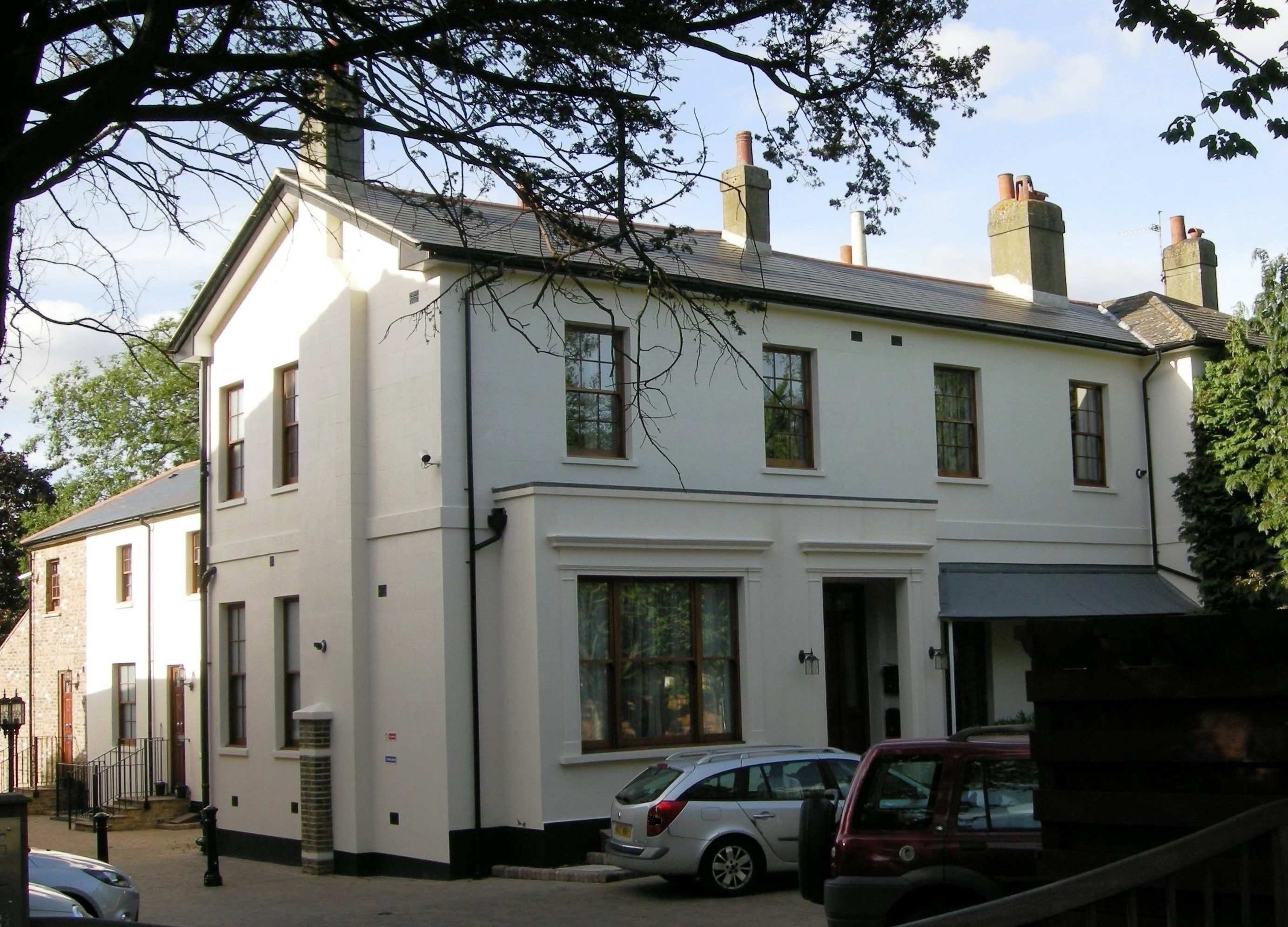
"Ashleigh", Addiscombe Road. The house was built in 1848, along with its neighbour, "India", as accommodation for professors at the Seminary

The site was sold on 30 August 1861 for £33,600 to the British Land Company, who demolished most of the buildings. All that remain are two former professors' houses, "Ashleigh" and "India", on the corner of Clyde Road and Addiscombe Road; and the former gymnasium on Havelock Road, now private apartments. The Land Company laid out five parallel roads over the greater part of the grounds, and built them up with villas. The five roads – Outram, Havelock, Elgin, Clyde and Canning Roads – all took their names from soldiers and politicians prominent on the British side in the events of 1857–58, although none was in fact a college alumnus.

== Headship ==
- 1809–22: James Andrew, styled Superintendent and Head Master
- 1822–24: Henry Carmichael-Smyth, styled Resident Superintendent (this appointment was regarded as temporary)
- 1824–34: Sir Robert Houston, styled Lieutenant-Governor
- 1834–50: Sir Ephraim Stannus, styled Lieutenant-Governor
- 1851–60: Sir Frederick Abbott, styled Lieutenant-Governor

== Notable cadets ==
Notable cadets include:

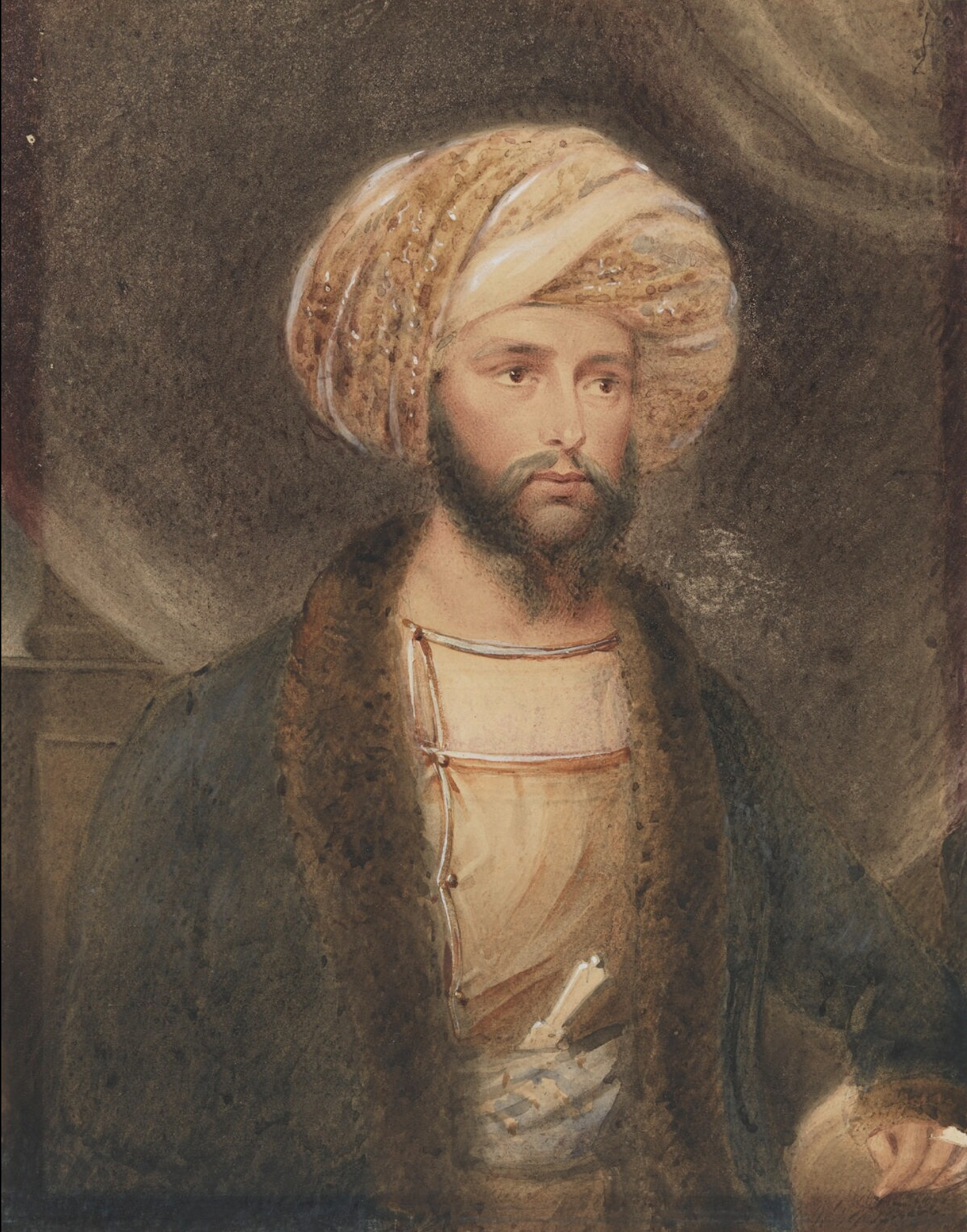
Sir James Abbott in Afghan dress. (B. Baldwin, 1841)

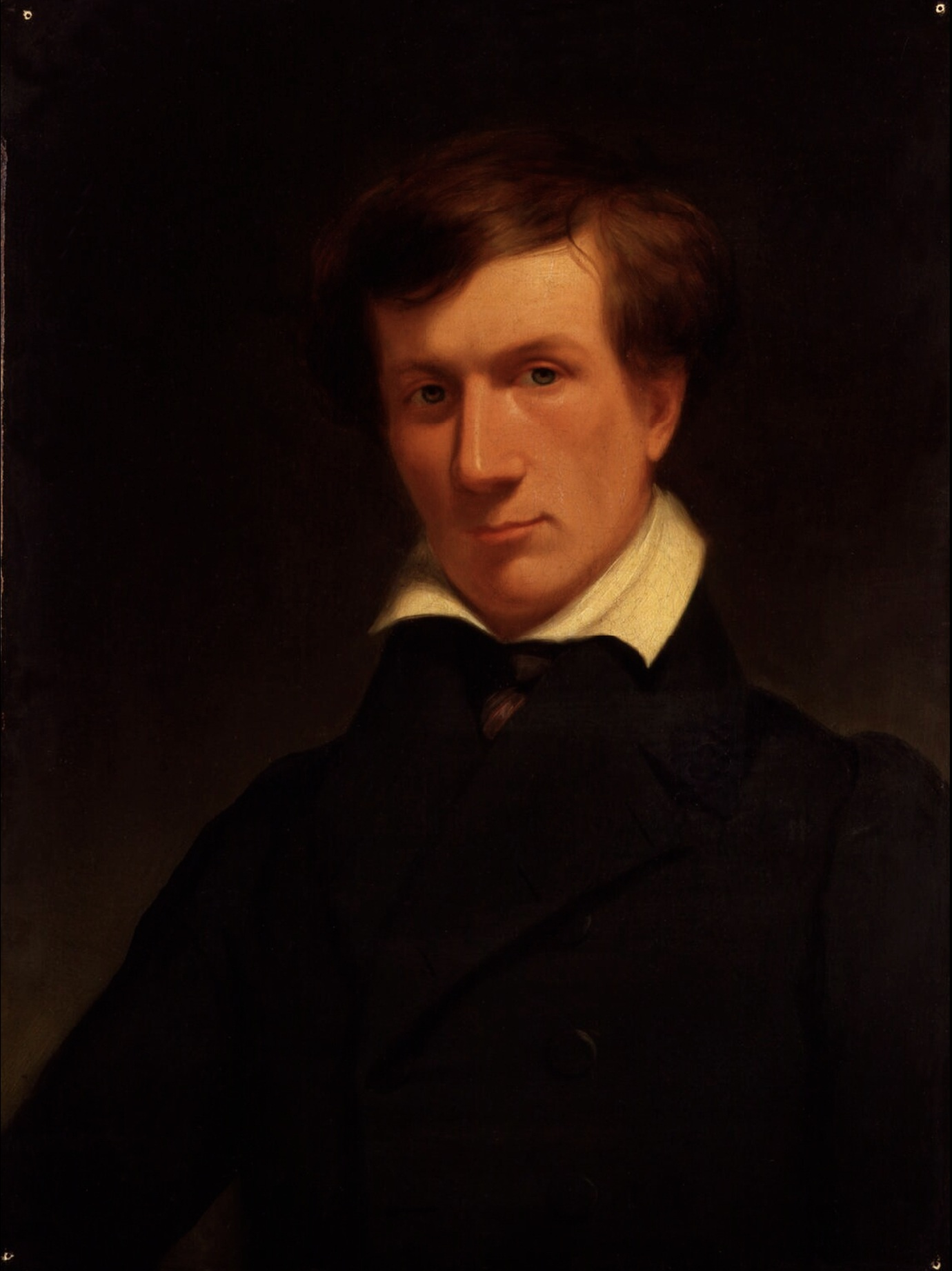
Sir Henry Lawrence

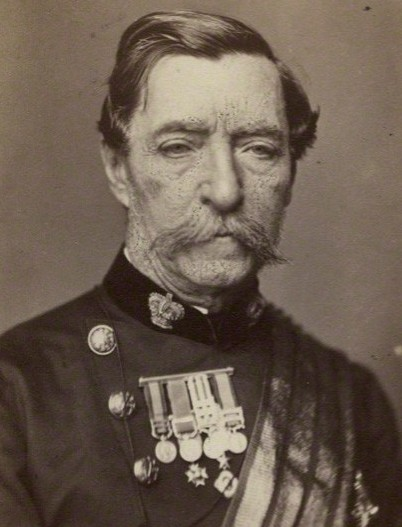
Robert Napier, 1st Baron Napier of Magdala

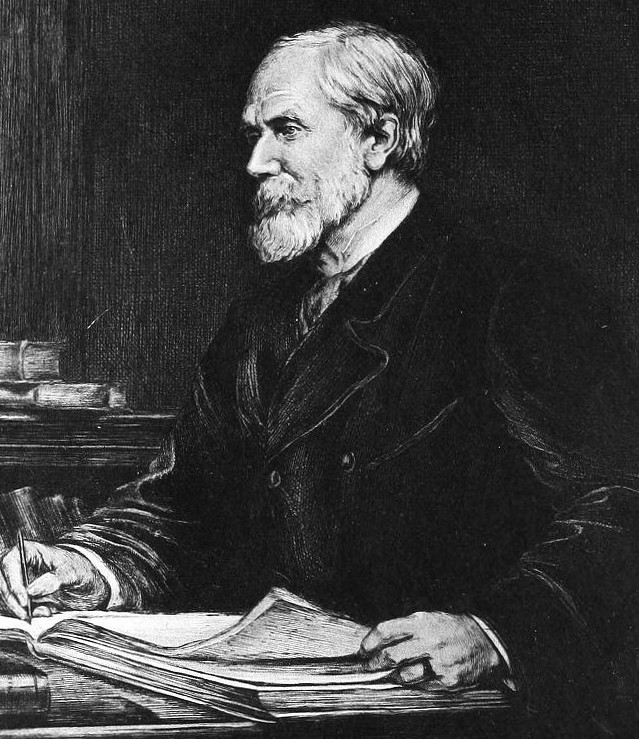
Sir Henry Yule

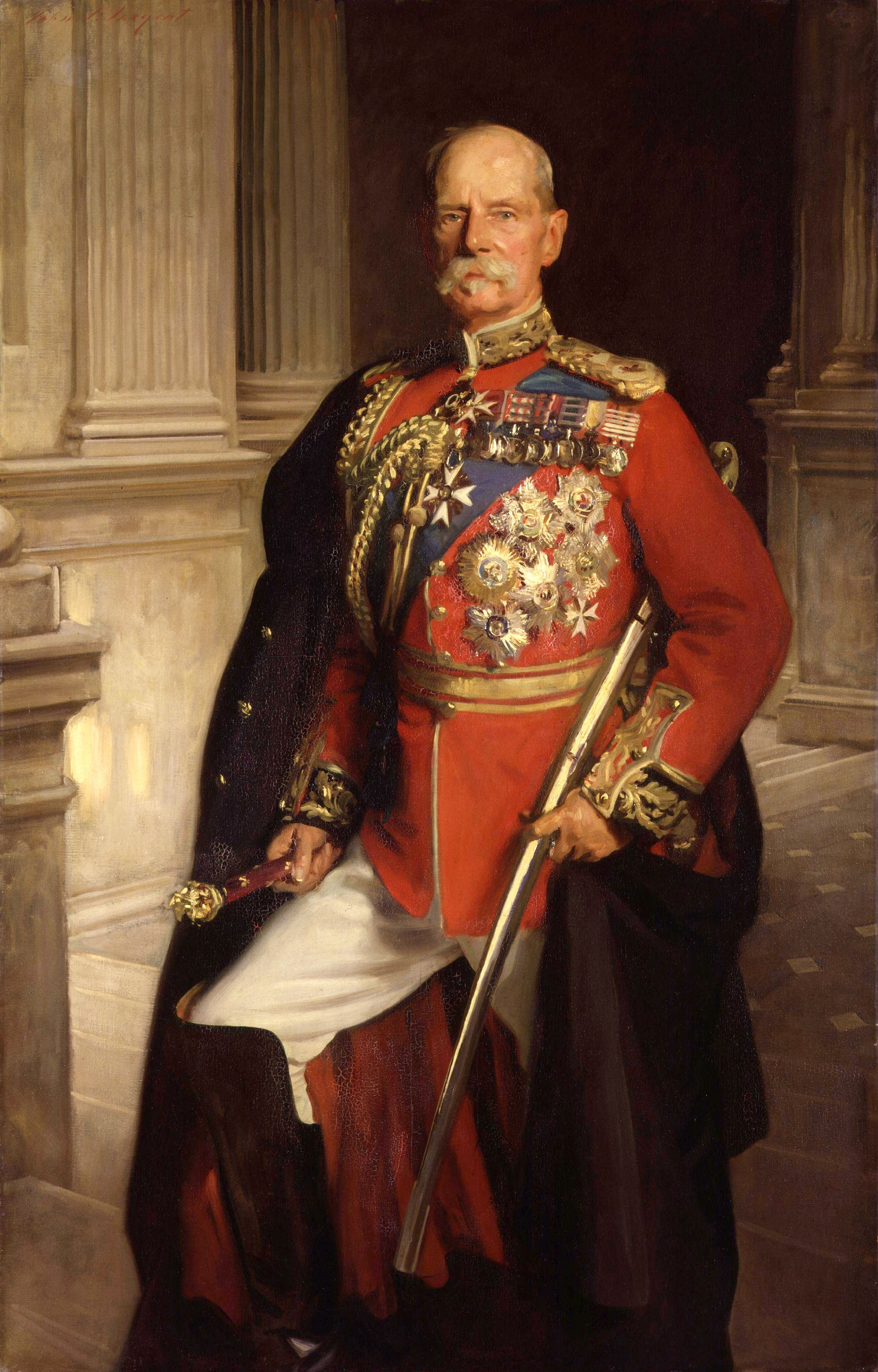
Lord Roberts of Kabul and Kandahar by John Singer Sargent

=== 1810s ===
- Augustus Abbott
- Sir Proby Cautley
- John Colvin
- Sir Arthur Cotton
- Sir Frederick Lester
- Sir George Lawrence
- James Oliphant
- Charles Waddington
- Sir Archdale Wilson, Bt

=== 1820s ===
- Sir Frederick Abbott
- Herbert Edward Stacy Abbott
- Sir James Abbott
- Saunders Alexius Abbott
- Sir William Erskine Baker
- John Archibald Ballard
- Arthur Conolly
- Sir Alexander Cunningham
- Sir Henry Marion Durand
- Vincent Eyre
- Hugh Fraser
- William Cornwallis Harris
- John Jacob
- Sir Atwell Lake
- Sir Henry Lawrence
- Sir Robert Montgomery
- Robert Napier, 1st Baron Napier of Magdala
- Sir Thomas Townsend Pears
- Eldred Pottinger
- Bradshaw Reilly
- Sir Richmond Shakespear
- Sir Andrew Scott Waugh

=== 1830s ===
- Sir Orfeur Cavenagh
- Douglas Hamilton
- Sir Arnold Burrowes Kemball
- Sir George Malcolm
- Sir William Olpherts VC
- Sir Frederick Pollock
- Joseph Medlicott Scriven
- Richard Baird Smith
- Sir Richard Strachey
- Henry Ravenshaw Thuillier
- Sir Henry Tombs VC
- James Travers VC
- Sir Henry Yule

=== 1840s ===
- Sir George Tomkyns Chesney
- Sir Peter Lumsden
- Donald Macintyre VC
- James John McLeod Innes VC
- James Rose, 23rd of Kilravock
- Sir John Carstairs McNeill VC
- Thomas George Montgomerie
- Sir Francis Norman
- Sir Lambert Playfair
- George Alexander Renny VC
- Sir Richard Sankey
- James Francis Tennant
- Sir Mowbray Thomson
- George Dobson Willoughby

=== 1850s ===
- Sir Charles Bernard
- Sir James Browne
- Thomas Tupper Carter-Campbell of Possil
- John Underwood Champain
- Sir Henry Collett
- James Dundas VC
- William Wilberforce Harris Greathed
- Frederick Edward Hadow
- Sir James Hills-Johnes VC
- Sir Samuel Swinton Jacob
- Thomas Herbert Lewin
- William Merriman
- Sir Charles Nairne
- John Pennycuick
- Sir Harry Prendergast VC
- Lord Roberts of Kabul and Kandahar VC
- Sir Oliver St John
- Sir Edward Talbot Thackeray VC
- Sir Henry Trotter
- Francis Ward

=== 1860s ===
- Sir Bindon Blood
- Sir Arthur George Hammond VC
- Sir Albert Hime
- Sir John Frederick Maurice
- Thomas Price
- Sir Edward Stedman
- Sir Robert Warburton

== Notable staff ==
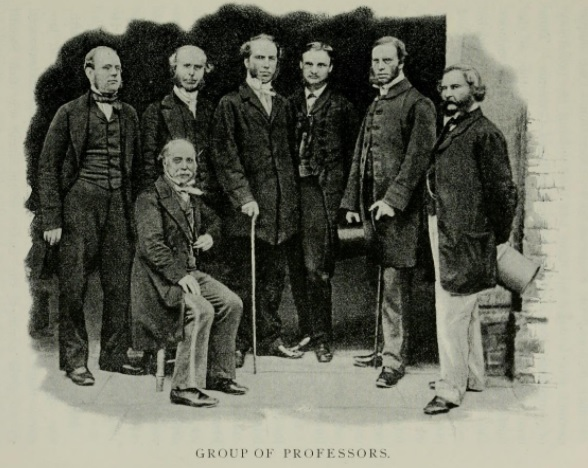
Group of Professors at Addiscombe Military Seminary

Staff at Addiscombe included:

- Sir Frederick Abbott, Lieutenant-Governor 1851–61
- Dr James Andrew, Superintendent 1809–22
- David T. Ansted, Lecturer in Geology 1845–61
- John Callow, Lecturer in Civil Drawing 1855–61
- Revd Jonathan Cape, Senior Professor of Mathematics 1822–61
- John Frederic Daniell, Professor of Chemistry 1835–45
- Theodore Henry Adolphus Fielding, Lecturer in Civil Drawing 1826–50
- Edward Frankland, Professor of Chemistry 1859–61
- John Christian Schetky, Lecturer in Civil Drawing 1836–55
- John Shakespear, Professor of Hindustani, 1809–29
- William Sturgeon, Lecturer in Science and Philosophy 1824–50
- William Frederick Wells, Lecturer in Civil Drawing 1813–36

=== Public Examiners ===
The Public Examiners were:

- 1809–20: Maj-Gen. William Mudge
- 1820–23: Maj-Gen. Sir Howard Douglas
- 1824–40: Maj-Gen. Sir Alexander Dickson
- 1840–55: Maj-Gen. Charles Pasley
- 1856–61: Maj-Gen. Sir Frederick Smith

== Bibliography ==
- Birbeck, Kate (2023). Addiscombe Military College and the Cadets who Forged an Empire. Ugley Green: Dreadnought. ISBN 9781999958770.
- Bourne, J. M. (1979). "The East India Company's Military Seminary, Addiscombe, 1809–1858". Journal of the Society for Army Historical Research. 57: 206–222.
- Broadfoot, W. (May 1893). "Addiscombe: The East India Company's Military College". Blackwood's Edinburgh Magazine. 153 (931). Blackwood, Pillans and Wilson: 647–57.
- Farrington, Anthony (1976). The Records of the East India College, Haileybury, & other institutions. London: H.M.S.O. pp. 111–23.
- Gent, John B., ed. (1987). Victorian Croydon Illustrated (2nd ed.). Croydon: Croydon Natural History & Scientific Society. pp. 20–21. ISBN 0-906047-00-5.
- Paget, Clarence G. (1937). Croydon Homes of the Past. Croydon: Croydon Central Library. pp. 34–45. (mainly on Addiscombe Place)
- Stearn, Roger T. (1994). "Addiscombe: the East India Company's Military Seminary". Soldiers of the Queen: The Journal of the Victorian Military Society. 79: 1–3.
- Vibart, Col. H. M. (1894). Addiscombe: Its Heroes and Men of Note. Westminster: Archibald Constable. OL 23336661M.
