= Herbert Abbott (British Army officer) =

English cricketer and British Army officer

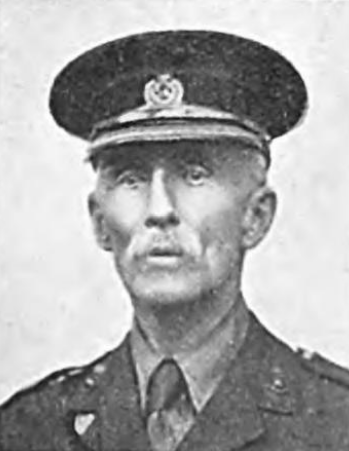

Personal information
- Full name: Herbert Edward Stacy Abbott
- Born: 6 April 1855; Alipore, Bengal, British India
- Died: 13 June 1939 (aged 84); Richmond, Surrey, England

Domestic team information
- Years: Team
- 1902: Marylebone Cricket Club

Career statistics
Competition	First-class
Matches	1
Runs scored	19
Batting average	9.50
100s/50s	0/0
Top score	18
Catches/stumpings	0/–
- Source: Cricinfo, 4 April 2015

Herbert Edward Stacy Abbott CBE DSO (6 April 1855 – 13 June 1939) was a British Army officer and an English amateur cricketer who made one appearance in first-class cricket.

The son of Major-General Herbert Edward Stacy Abbott, he was born in British India at Alipore. He was educated at Elizabeth College, Guernsey, before attending the Royal Military Academy, Woolwich. Abbott was commissioned into the Royal Engineers on 17 August 1874, and was sent to India in 1877. He served in the Second Anglo-Afghan War as an assistant engineer. Following the war he was posted to the Punjab where he worked in the Punjab Public Works Department. He was promoted to captain in August 1885 and later served with the Hazara Expedition of 1888, with promotion to major coming in 1894. He was appointed a Companion of the Distinguished Service Order in January 1896 for his actions with the Chitral Relief Force, and was later promoted to lieutenant colonel in 1901.

While briefly back in England in 1902, Abbott played a single first-class cricket match, at the age of 47, for Marylebone Cricket Club (MCC) against London County at Crystal Palace. He returned to India where he became the officiating Chief Engineer of the Public Works Department in the Punjab, 1903–1904, before returning to England to retire in 1906, upon which he was granted the rank of colonel. He was re-employed in 1909 as War Office Inspector of Territorial Buildings and was placed in charge of the Duke of York's Headquarters in Chelsea. His only son was killed in action during the First World War, during which Abbott served in London on special duties. He was made a CBE in the War Honours List of January 1919.

He died at Richmond in Surrey on 13 June 1939.
