= James Carmichael Smyth (physician) =

Scottish physician and medical writer

James Carmichael Smyth FRS FRCP
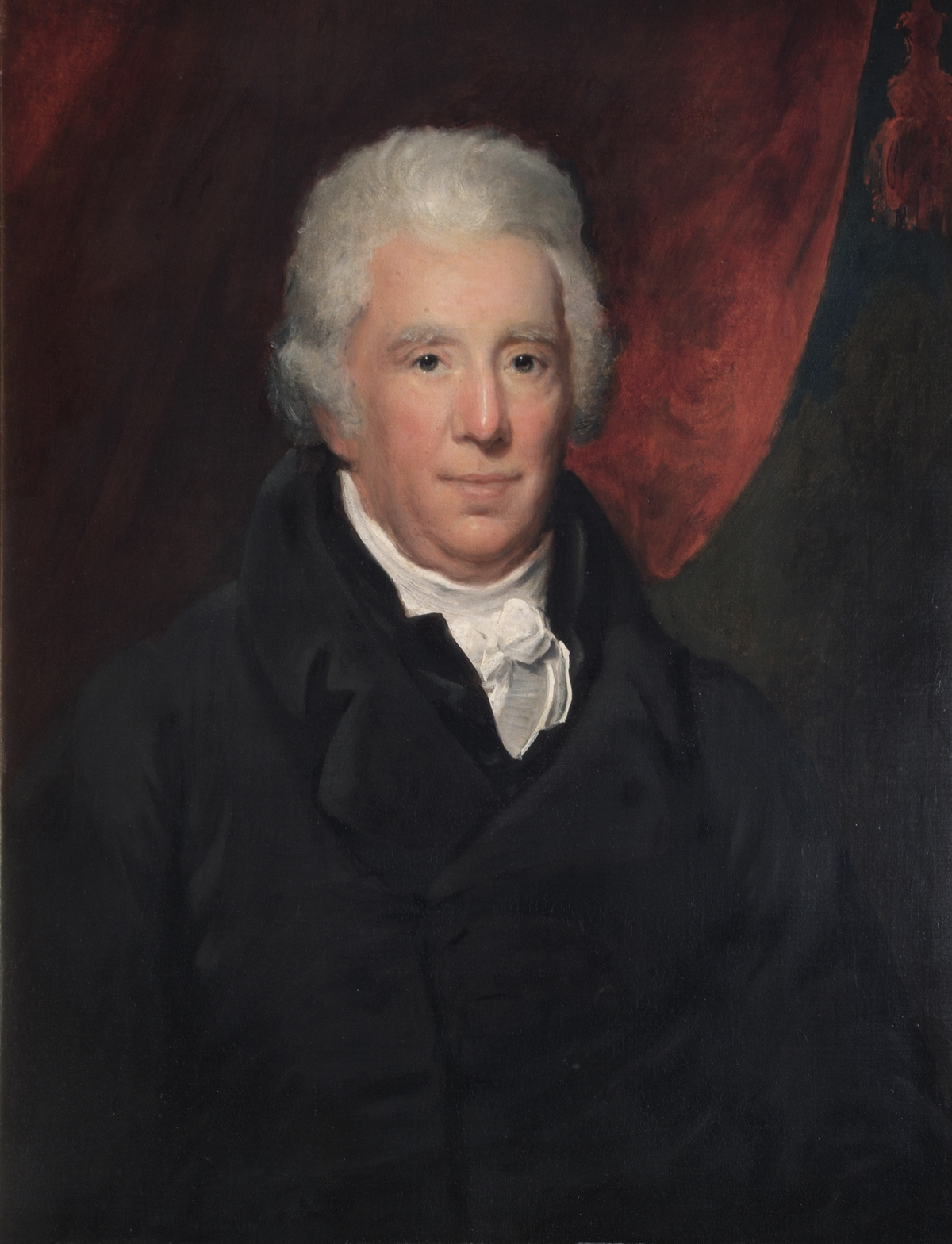
- James Carmichael Smyth c. 1803
- Born: James Carmichael; 23 February 1742; Fife, Scotland
- Died: 18 June 1821 (aged 79)
- Education: University of Edinburgh
- Occupations: Physician and medical writer
- Relatives: James Carmichael-Smyth (son); William Henry Carmichael-Smyth (son)

James Carmichael Smyth FRS FRCP (23 February 1742 – 18 June 1821) was a Scottish physician and medical writer.

== Life ==
He was born in Fife, Scotland, as James Carmichael, the only son of Margaret Smyth of Aithernie and Thomas Carmichael of Balmedie. He later added his mother's surname to his own. He graduated as a Doctor of Medicine from the University of Edinburgh in 1764. Appointed physician to the Middlesex Hospital in 1768, he discovered a method for the prevention of contagion in cases of fever using nitrous acid gas, and wrote several treatises on this subject and on other medical matters. He was elected a Fellow of the Royal Society in May 1779, and was voted the sum of £5000 by Parliament in 1802 for his work. He was one of the physicians to King George III, and a Fellow of the Royal College of Physicians.

The results (published in 1796) of an experiment made at the desire of the Lords Commissioners of the Admiralty, on board the Union hospital ship, to determine the effect of the nitrous acid in destroying contagion, and the safety with which it may be employed were given in a letter addressed to the Right Hon. Earl Spencer, by James Carmichael Smyth, M. D. F.R.S., Fellow of the Royal College of Physicians, and Physician Extraordinary to His Majesty, published with the approbation of the lords commissioners of the Admiralty.

His eldest son, James, initially an officer in the Royal Engineers and later Governor of the Bahamas and British Guiana, was created a baronet in 1821. A younger son, Henry, was stepfather to William Makepeace Thackeray.
