= Robert Louis Houston =

General Sir Robert Houstoun KCB (2 December 1780 – 5 April 1862) was a British military officer in the service of the East India Company.

== Life ==
He was born in Jordanhill, Renfrewshire in 1780. He was the fifth son of Andrew Houstoun, a wealthy Scottish banker and merchant in the West Indies.

He was commissioned as a cornet in the 2nd Light Cavalry of the Bengal Army in 1795, and in 1800 at just the age of twenty was made adjutant of the 6th Regiment. Following the taking of Bhowannee in 1809 he was received his majority. He served as a brigade major in two campaigns during the Second Anglo-Maratha War in 1803 and 1804. He succeed to the command of his regiment as captain in 1805, and held the position for the following nine years. In 1812-13 he commanded troops against the Pindaris in Berar Province and in 1814 was in command on the frontier at Mirzapur. Following this he returned to England on ill health and was appointed Companion of the Order of the Bath in 1817, one of the first officers in the Indian Army.

He returned to India in 1817 at the start of the Third Anglo-Maratha War and was nominated to the command of the Guides and Intelligence Department. On conclusion of the war he was made commander of a cavalry depot until 1819. Thereafter he was placed in the command of forces in Malwa until 1821 when he was again forced to return to England due to ill health. In 1823, two years after his return, he was made Lieutenant-governor of the East India Company Military Seminary in Addiscombe. During his tenure at Addiscombe he was known as a strict disciplinarian although with a kindly disposition and was very hospitable to the cadets. He obtained the nickname "Black Dick" due to his swarthy complexion, although why he was called Dick is unknown. He resigned his post on 26 March 1834 and was presented with the sum of 500 guineas for his service.

Houston was appointed Knight Commander of the Order of the Bath in 1838 and became a General in the East India Company's service in 1854. He died in Torquay, Devon in 1862.

== Family ==
His daughter Rachel Houston married Charles Murray Barstow, President of the Society of Accountants in Edinburgh.
