= Herbert Edward Stacy Abbott =

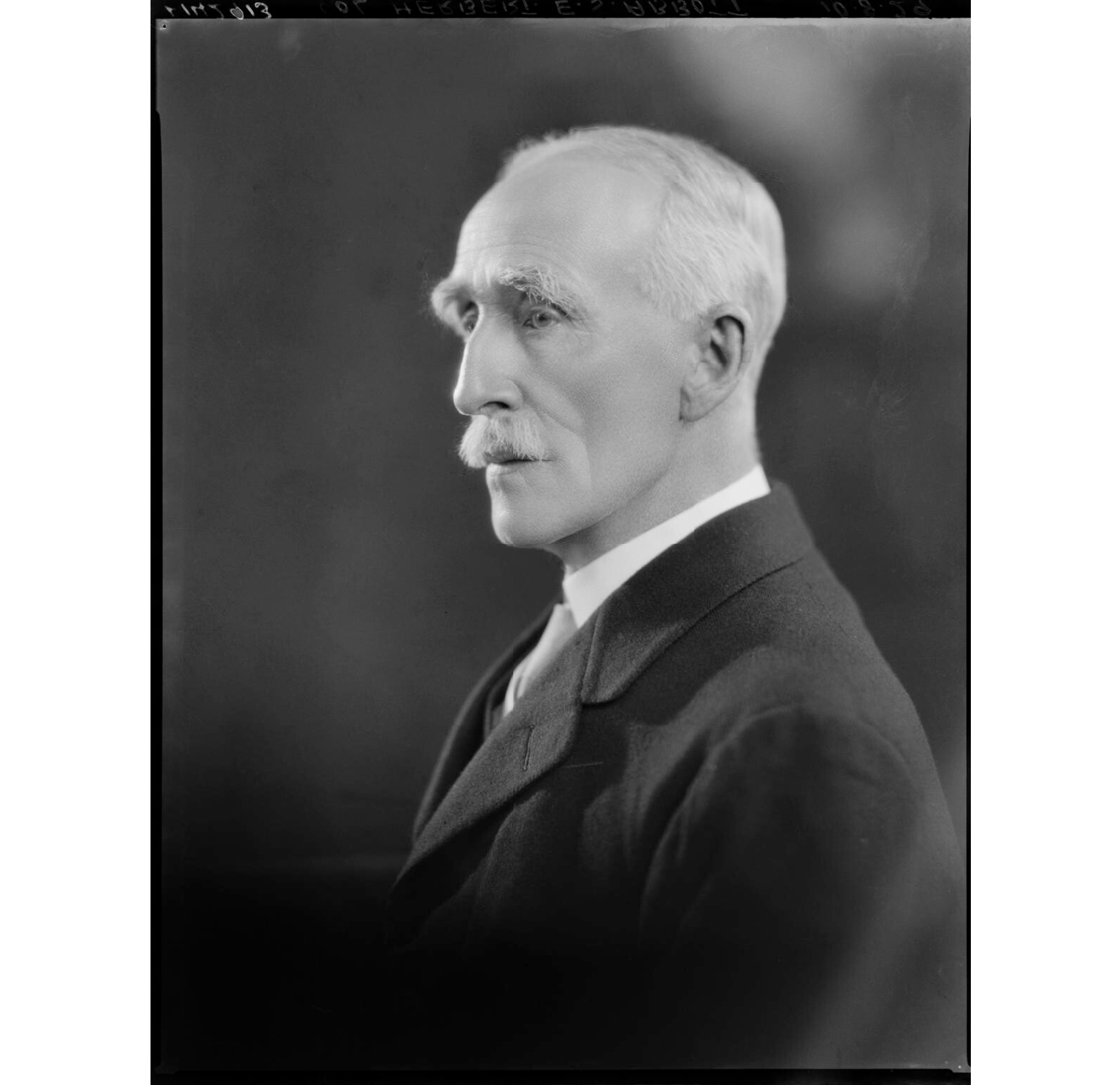
- Herbert Edward Stacy Abbott by Lafayette
- Born: 19 November 1814
- Died: 1883 (aged 68–69); Kensington, London
- Military career
- Allegiance: United Kingdom
- Branch: British Indian Army
- Rank: Major general

Major-General Herbert Edward Stacy Abbott (19 November 1814 – 1883) was an officer in the armies of the East India Company and British Crown in India, under colonial rule.

== Background and education ==
Abbott was the son of George Edward Abbott (died 1822) and Ann (or Anna) Maria Stacy, who married in India. He had an older sister, Marianne Sarah Abbott (1808–1887), who married Charles Scott Hadow. Abbott's father was the Head Assistant in the Calcutta General Post Office. while his mother was the daughter of the Reverend Henry Peter Stacy (born c.1760), who was believed to have been chaplain at Danapur. An image of Reverend H. P. Stacy is in the Manchester Art Gallery.

Abbott was educated at Addiscombe Military Seminary from 1829 to 1831, from where he joined the 74th Native Infantry.

== Publications ==
Abbott published anonymously a short account of the Indian Rebellion of 1857, not intended for widespread public circulation, entitled Particulars of the Mutiny at Delhi, on the 11 May, 1857.

== Other contributions ==
In about 1886 Abbott designed the Ellerslie building in Shimla which is the home of the Himachal Pradesh Secretariat.

A photograph of General Abbott and his medals are in the collection of the National Army Museum, London.

== Personal life ==
Abbott married Sarah Masson. Their son, Herbert Abbott (1855–1939), became a keen cricketer, who played for the Marylebone Cricket Club, and was a decorated British Army officer.
