= William Henry Carmichael-Smyth =

Major William Henry Carmichael-Smyth (30 July 1780 – 9 September 1861) was a British military officer in the service of the East India Company.

== Biography ==
He was born in England in 1780. His father was James Carmichael Smyth, a Scottish physician and he was educated at Charterhouse School.

In 1797, at the age of seventeen, he was commissioned into the Bengal Artillery. On arriving in Bengal that same year he was deployed on a military expedition to the Philippines. When the expedition was abandoned he returned from Penang and served in Allahabad. In 1803 the Second Anglo-Maratha War broke out, and he was present at the battles of Aligarh, Delhi and Laswari. In May 1804 he accompanied a force against Rampoora, and later served at the Battle of Deeg and Siege of Deeg where he was mentioned in dispatches. In 1805 he was present at the Siege of Bharatpur and after it was abandoned he was made garrison engineer at Agra. The following year in 1806 he directed the attack on Gohud. He returned to England in 1807 due to ill health.

Carmichael-Smyth returned to India in 1810 as a captain, and served in the Invasion of Java in 1811. Thereafter he returned to Bengal and went to Callinger as a field engineer where he was mentioned in dispatches for exemplary valour in 1812. He subsequently was deployed on surveys before he was selected to assist in a campaign against Alwar. Following the campaign he returned to his position as garrison engineer at Agra where he would remain until 1819. During the Anglo-Nepalese War between 1814 and 1816 he served in all the operations under Sir David Ochterlony. In February 1817 he assisted in the reduction of Hathras. That same year he joined the army of Lord Hastings in the Third Anglo-Maratha War. On 13 March 1817 at Cawnpore he married Anne Thackeray, the widow of Richmond Thackeray, and became step-father to a young William Makepeace Thackeray. He returned to England in 1820 and was elevated to Major in 1821.

In 1822 he was appointed Resident Superintendent at East India Company Military Seminary in Addiscombe. He remained in the post until he was succeeded by Robert Houston on 6 April 1824. He died in Ayr, Scotland on 9 September 1861.
