= James Andrews (clergyman) =

American Presbyterian minister (1928 - 2006)

The Reverend James E. Andrews
- Born: December 29, 1928; Whittenburg, Texas, U.S.
- Died: March 7, 2006 (aged 77); Decatur, Georgia, U.S.
- Education: Austin College
- Occupation: Presbyterian minister
- Known for: Stated Clerk of the Presbyterian Church (U.S.A.)

James E. Andrews (December 29, 1928 – March 7, 2006) was an American Presbyterian minister who served as Stated Clerk of the Presbyterian Church in the United States (PCUS) from 1973 until its 1983 reunion, and then as Stated Clerk of the Presbyterian Church (U.S.A.) from 1983 to 1996. He facilitated the 1983 merger of the PCUS and the United Presbyterian Church in the United States (UPCUSA).

== Early life and education ==
Andrews earned a bachelor’s degree from Austin College in 1952 and a master’s degree in 1953. He was ordained in the Presbyterian Church in the United States in 1956.

Following his ordination, Andrews served as assistant pastor of St. Andrew’s Presbyterian Church in Houston from 1956 to 1958. He then went to Geneva, Switzerland, and served from 1958 to 1960 as secretary of information for the World Alliance of Reformed Churches). After returning to the United States, he became an assistant to the president of Princeton Theological Seminary (1960–71) and then assistant to the Stated Clerk of the PCUS (1971–73).

== Contributions and legacy ==
Andrews was a key architect of the 1983 reunion of the Presbyterian denominations.

On March 6, 2006, at the age of 77, Andrews died after being struck by a car near his home in Decatur, Georgia.

Religious titles
New title	Stated Clerk of the Presbyterian Church (USA); 1984–1996	Succeeded by Clifton Kirkpatrick
