= James Andrew (educator) =

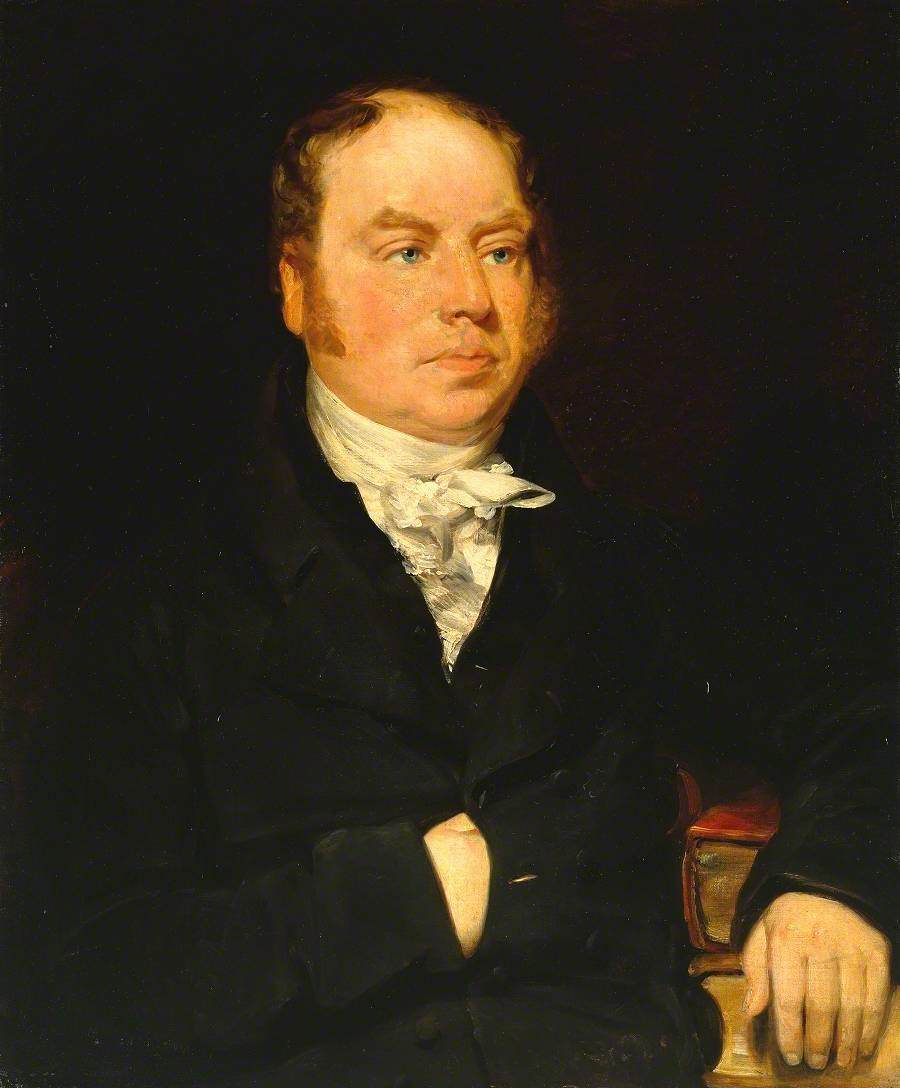
The Revd Dr James Andrew, 1818, by John Constable (1776-1837) - N05965 - Tate Gallery

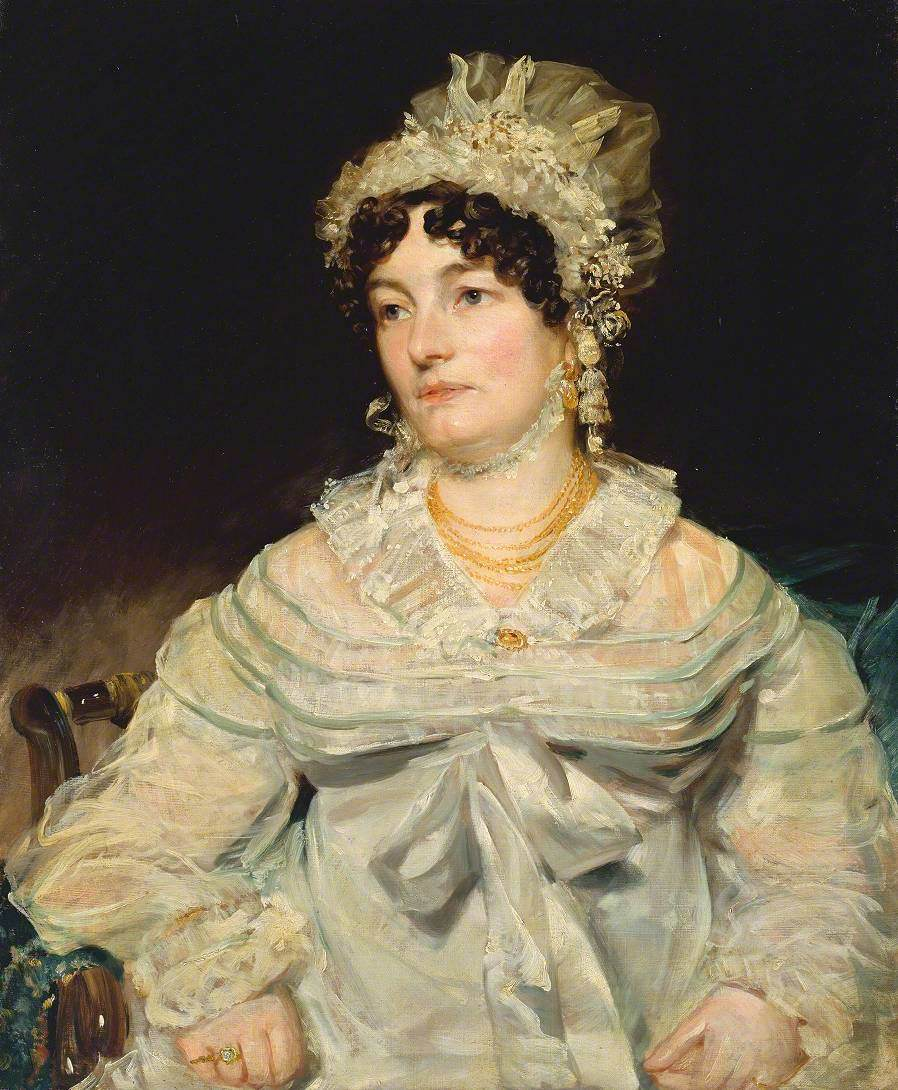
Mrs James Andrew, 1818, by John Constable (1776-1837) - N05966 - Tate Gallery

James Andrew, LL.D. (1774?–13 June 1833), was the principal of the East India Company's Military Seminary at Addiscombe, Surrey from 1809 to 1822.

Andrew originated from Scotland, and received his education at Aberdeen. He attended Marischal College, gaining an MA in 1792. He established a successful private military academy at Woolwich Common which prepared pupils for the Royal Military Academy, Woolwich. In 1809 the East India Company purchased Addiscombe Place, near Croydon, to be its military seminary, training cadets for its private army in India. Andrew was appointed headmaster and Professor of Mathematics. He was elected a Fellow of the Royal Society in March, 1821.

The terms of his contract allowed him to accrue large profits from the cadets' fees: following criticism, the system was changed at his request in 1821. He retired in August 1822 and died at Edinburgh on 13 June 1833.

Andrew was the author of Astronomical and Nautical Tables (1805); Institutes of Grammar and Chronological Tables (1817); Key to Scriptural Chronology (1822); and Hebrew Grammar and Dictionary without Points (1823). The copy of this book in the British Library belonged to the Prince Augustus Frederick, Duke of Sussex, and contains an autograph letter of Andrew.

== Family ==
James Andrew was baptised on 24 December 1774 at St Nicholas, Aberdeen. His parents are recorded as James Andrew and Jean Low. James Andrew and Jean Lowe were married on 2 May 1771 at Inverkeithny, Banff. Jean Low was baptised at Inverkeithny on 9 May 1746. Her parents are recorded as Gavin Low and Margaret Alexander.

He married Jane Falding, of Lewisham, on 21 February 1809 at St Paul's Church, Shadwell, now in the London Borough of Tower Hamlets. His address is given as Woolwich, Kent.

In Astronomical and Nautical Tables James Andrew credits his uncle, Gavin Lowe of Islington, "to whom I am indebted for a complete Table of Formulæ for reducing Time out of one denomination to another...". In his will of 1812, Gavin Lowe, "of the Parish of St Mary, Islington", appointed "my dear nephew Doctor James Andrew of Addiscombe" as his executor. After stating that his books and mathematical and optical instruments are to be sold, Gavin Lowe bequeathed his chronometer to James Andrew. Gavin Lowe, of Paradise Row, Islington, died in 1815, aged 72.

== Sources ==
- "Andrew, James" . Dictionary of National Biography. London: Smith, Elder & Co. 1885–1900.
- Stearn, Roger T. (2006) [2004]. "Andrew, James (1774?–1833)". Oxford Dictionary of National Biography (online ed.). Oxford University Press.
