= John Callow =

English artist (1822–1878)

John Callow (1822–1878) was an English artist.

== Life ==
John Callow was born in 1822. He was taught by his brother, the artist William Callow. He became a member of the New Watercolour Society, and an associate of the Old Watercolour Society. He was junior professor of drawing at the Royal Military College, Addiscombe from 1855 to 1861. According to H.M. Vibart, writing in 1894, Callow "never became a favourite of the cadets, for he was a jaundiced, saturnine character with no good-humour or geniality about him." He was master of landscape at the Royal Military Academy, Woolwich, 1861–1865, and professor at Queen's College, London, 1875–1878. He painted marine subjects and landscapes, mostly in watercolour. He died in 1878 in New Cross, south-east London.
