= Bert Abbott (rugby union) =

- Full name: Herbert Melville Abbott
- Born: 30 April 1903 Beaconsfield, TAS, Australia
- Died: 5 October 1973 (aged 70)
- Height: 6 ft 1 in (185 cm)
- Weight: 14 st (196 lb; 89 kg)

Rugby union career
- Position: Flanker
Provincial / State sides
Years	Team	Apps	(Points)
1928–29	New South Wales	4	(9)
International career
Years	Team	Apps	(Points)
1928	Australia		

Herbert Melville Abbott (30 April 1903 – 5 October 1973) was an Australian international rugby union player.

Born in Beaconsfield, Tasmania, Abbott played his early rugby with Manly in Sydney, before heading down to Victoria and joining the Melbourne RUFC in 1925. He was a Victoria interstate representative.

Abbott, having returned to Manly, earned a New South Wales call up in 1928 for their visit to New Zealand, which retrospectively has come to be considered a full national team tour. He featured as a back rower in three uncapped tour matches, against Wanganui, Southland and Marlborough.

== See also ==
- List of Australia national rugby union players
