= Bert Abbott (footballer) =

English footballer (1875–1911)

Personal information
- Full name: Herbert Wood Abbott
- Date of birth: 1875
- Place of birth: Bromham, England or Devizes, Wiltshire
- Date of death: 22 October 1911 (aged 35–36)
- Place of death: Gibraltar
- Position: Centre-half

Senior career*
Years	Team	Apps	(Gls)
- Ruddington
1894–1897	Nottingham Forest	5	(0)
1897–1899	Sheppey United		
Total		5	(0)
- * Club domestic league appearances and goals

Herbert Wood Abbott (1875 – 22 October 1911) was an English footballer who played at centre half in the Football League for Nottingham Forest. He was born in Devizes, Wiltshire in Q4 1875.

Bert Abbott played for Ruddington prior to playing for Nottingham Forest. He made his league debut for Forest on 1 January 1895 in the 0–0 draw away at Blackburn Rovers.

Abbott mainly played for the Nottingham Forest Reserve team.

After his time at Forest, in 1897 Abbott moved to Sheppey United on the Isle of Sheppey.

== Death ==
After his football career, Abbott became an Artificer serving in the Royal Navy. He died whilst diving from the yard-arm of the floating barrack HMS Calcutta on 22 October 1911 in Gibraltar. He was stunned on contact with the water and drowned. He was 35 years old.

== Career statistics ==
Appearances and goals by club, season and competition
Club	Season	League			FA Cup		United Counties League		Total	
Club	Season	Division	Apps	Goals	Apps	Goals	Apps	Goals	Apps	Goals
Nottingham Forest	1894–95	First Division	3	0	0	0	3	0	6	0
Nottingham Forest	1895–96	First Division	1	0	0	0	0	0	1	0
Nottingham Forest	1896–97	First Division	1	0	0	0	0	0	1	0
Career total			5	0	0	0	3	0	8	0
