= 20th Regiment of Bengal Native Infantry =

Regiment of Bengal

== Chronology ==
- 1776 raised for the Vizier of Oude under Captain Baillie
- 1777 incorporated in HEIC service as the 27th Regiment of Bengal Native Infantry
- 1781 became the 20th Regiment of Bengal Native Infantry
- 1784 became the 23rd Regiment of Bengal Native Infantry
- 1786 became the 23rd Battalion of Bengal Native Infantry
- 1796 became the 2nd Battalion 5th Regiment of Bengal Native Infantry
- 1824 became the 20th Regiment of Bengal Native Infantry
- 1857 Mutinied at Meerut 10 May

In 1861, after the mutiny, the title was given to the 8th Regiment of Punjab Infantry
