= Dalry, North Ayrshire =

Coordinates: 55.711°N 4.723°W

Dalry: Scottish Gaelic: Dail Ruighe
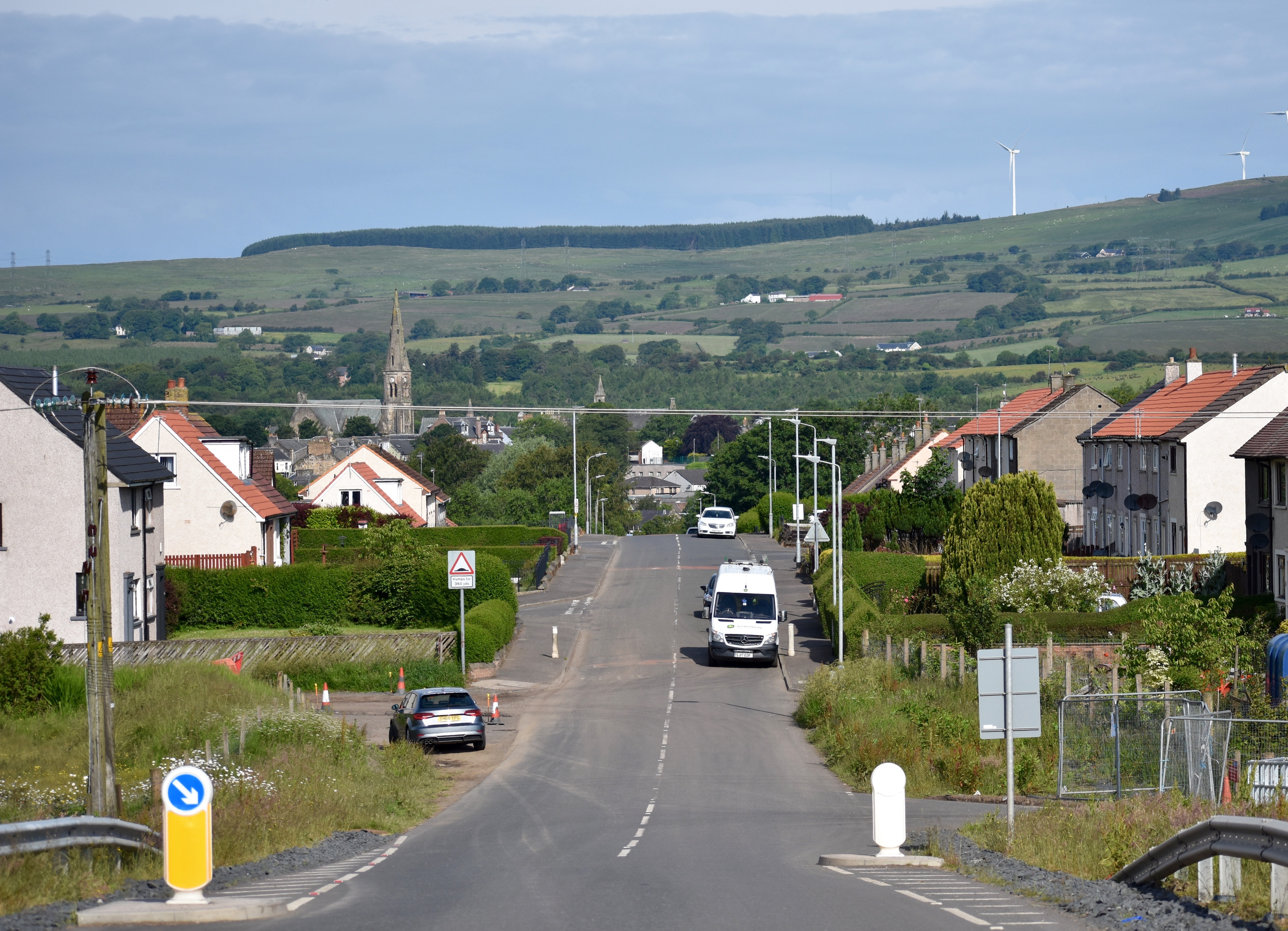
- Dalry town centre, North Ayrshire

- Location within North Ayrshire
- Population: 5,250 (2020)
- OS grid reference: NS290497
- Council area: North Ayrshire
- Lieutenancy area: Ayrshire and Arran
- Country: Scotland
- Sovereign state: United Kingdom
- Post town: DALRY
- Postcode district: KA24
- Dialling code: 01294
- Police: Scotland
- Fire: Scottish
- Ambulance: Scottish
- UK Parliament: North Ayrshire and Arran
- Scottish Parliament: Cunninghame North

Dalry (/dælˈraɪ/) is a town in the Garnock Valley in North Ayrshire, Scotland. Drakemyre is a northern suburb.

== History ==
Dalry (from Scottish Gaelic: Dail Ruighe, 'the haugh at the slope') is a small settlement on the Rye Burn. Its history has signs of early inhabitants in the area; the remains of an ancient fort, made of three concentric round walls, can be found on the summit of Carwinning Hill to the North of Dalry, west of the B784 to Largs.

In 1883, excavations by John Smith of caves in the Dalry Blair estate at Cleeves Cove found evidence of prehistoric man and otter bones.

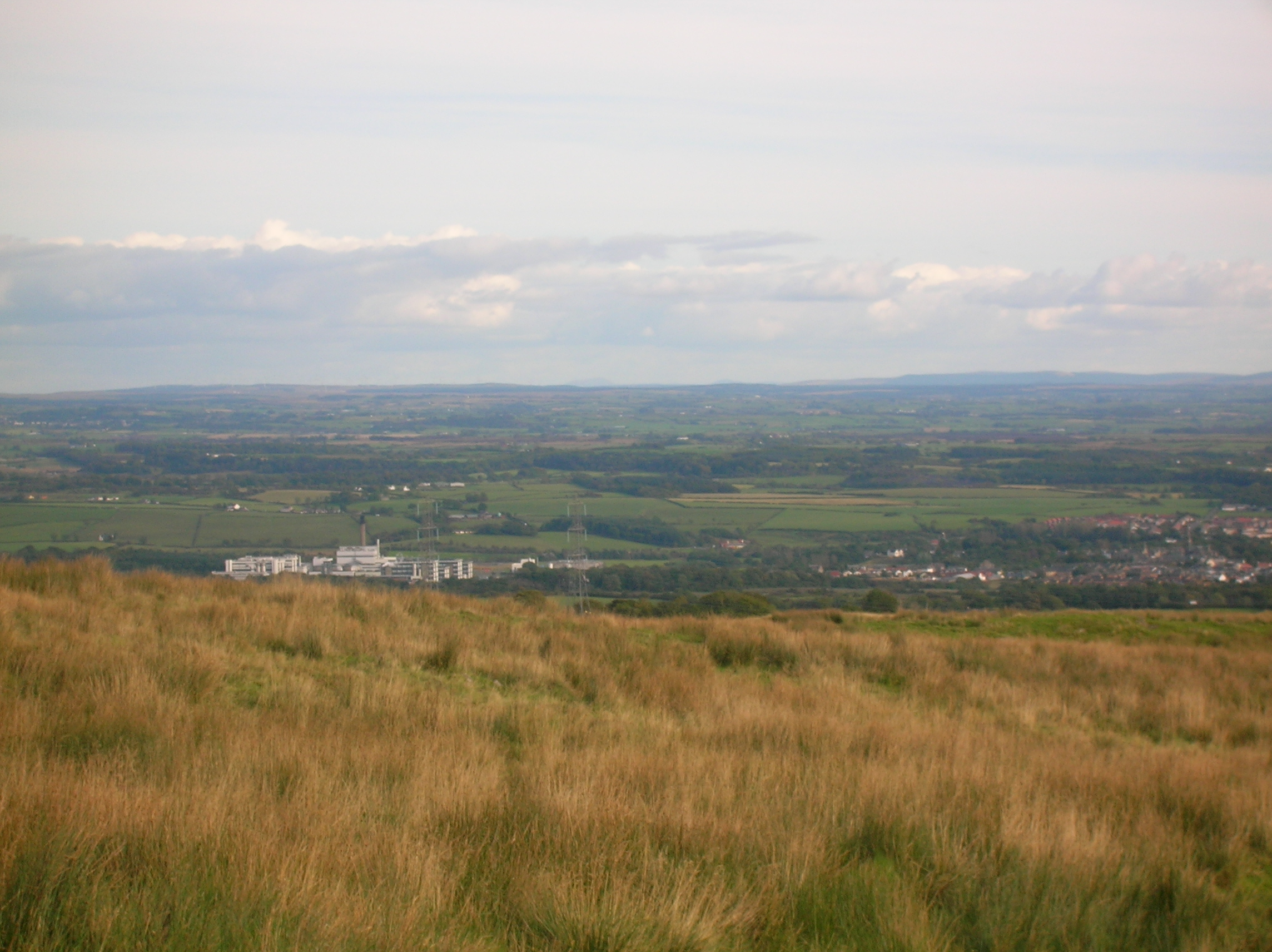
Dalry from Baidland Hill.

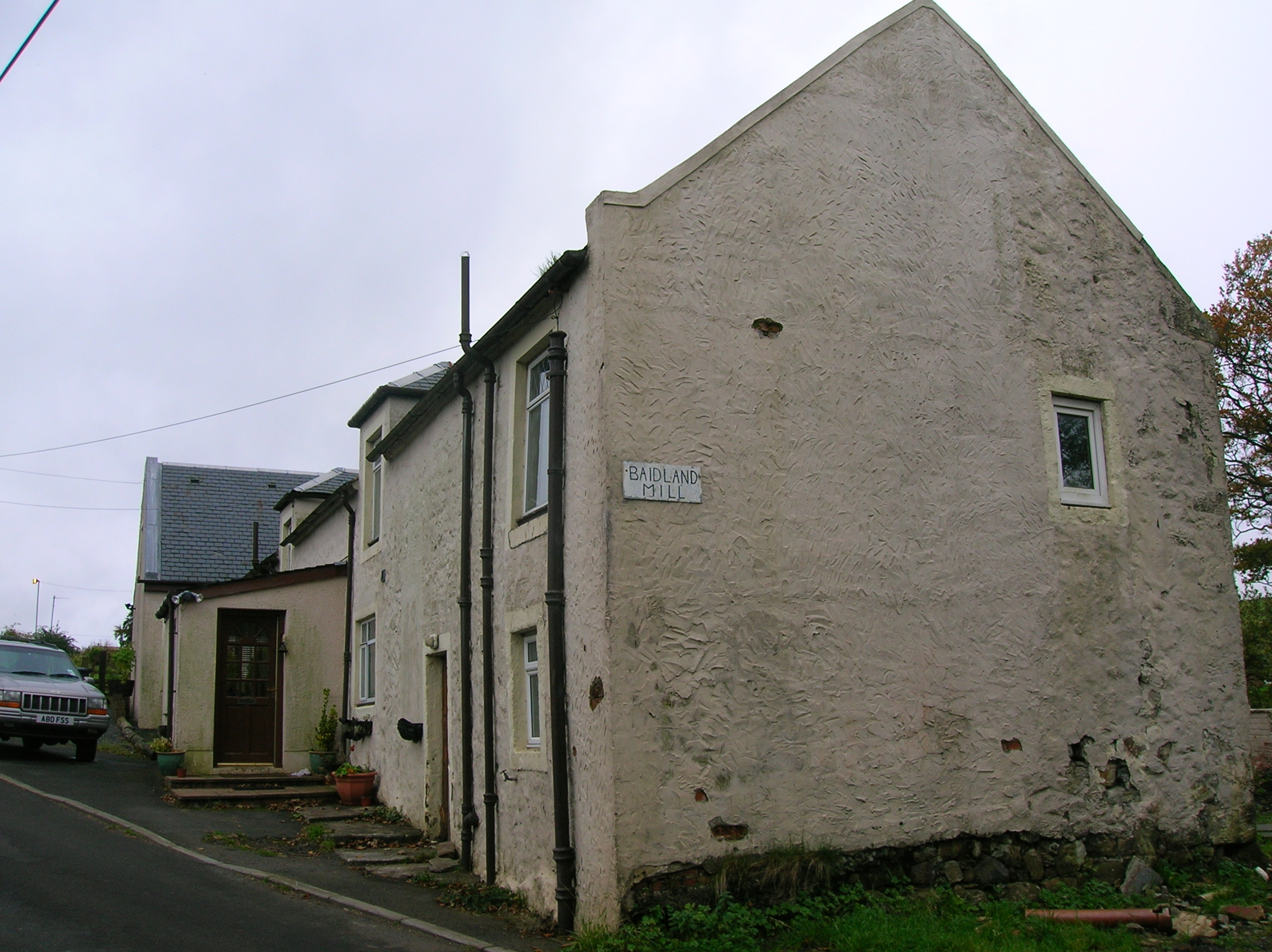
Baidland Mill on the old Baidland estate.

Aitnock Fort at the south-west angle of Hindog Glen, was excavated by John Smith in 1901–02, it showed a possible dun occupying the summit of a cliff which rises about 60 feet (18 m) perpendicularly from the Rye Water. He stated in his Excavations of the forts of Castlehill, Aitnock and Coalhill, Ayrshire, that it was defended on one side by the steep drop to the Rye and by a horseshoe shaped deep ditch and stone walls.

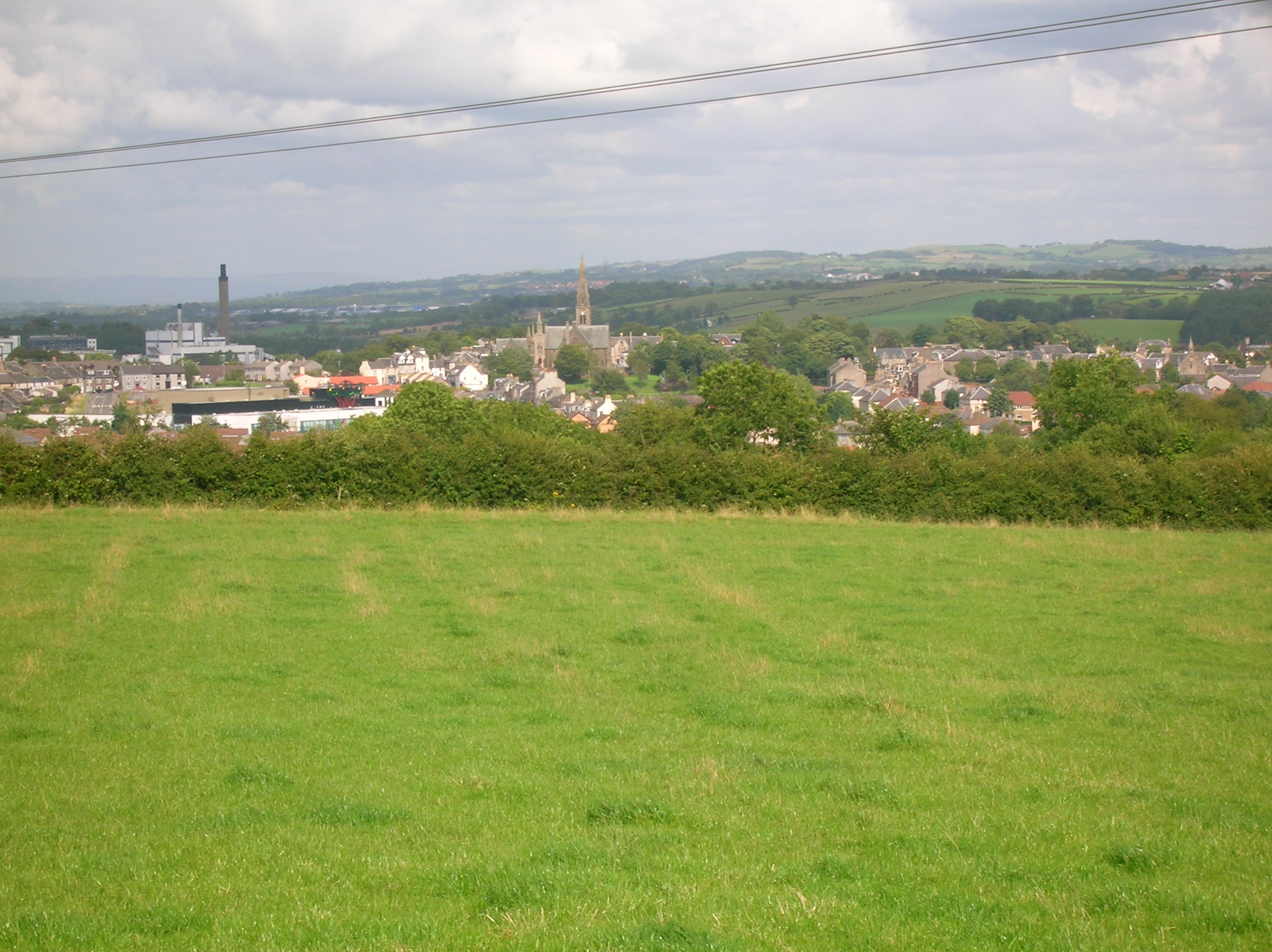
Dalry from Lynncraigs Hill.

The interior was about 30 feet (9.1 m) in diameter, the floor had been leveled, then covered with yellow clay over which a pavement of rough slabs and river pebbles had been laid. On the pavement was an accumulation of deposits, in some places 6 inches (150 mm) deep, in and on which the relics were found... coins, stone objects, a glass bead, 1st- or 2nd-century Samian bowl fragments, burnt bones and iron objects. A sandstone cauldron was found near the centre of the interior, close by was a fireplace of slabs set on edge; this, he states, was possibly used to heat the water in the cauldron. An irregular lump of sandstone was also found, bearing two chiseled cup marks one on each side, almost opposite each other. During his excavations he found four silver Roman coins, all denarii, two of Antoninus Pius and one each of Vespasian and Hadrian, all of which came from parts of an upper black layer of occupation. Smith's collection of this material was donated to the National Museum of Antiquities of Scotland in 1981.

At Courthill, excavations were undertaken by Cochrane–Patrick (1878) & Dobie (1876) in the 1870s. The remains of a timber hall similar to those in England dated to around the 8th century were found. These digs refer to a timber hall or court structure with a turf roof, that was then replaced by a motte (a structure on a hill) similar to those used by the early Normans infiltrating the area then. Amongst the debris a flint arrow head from an even earlier period was found.

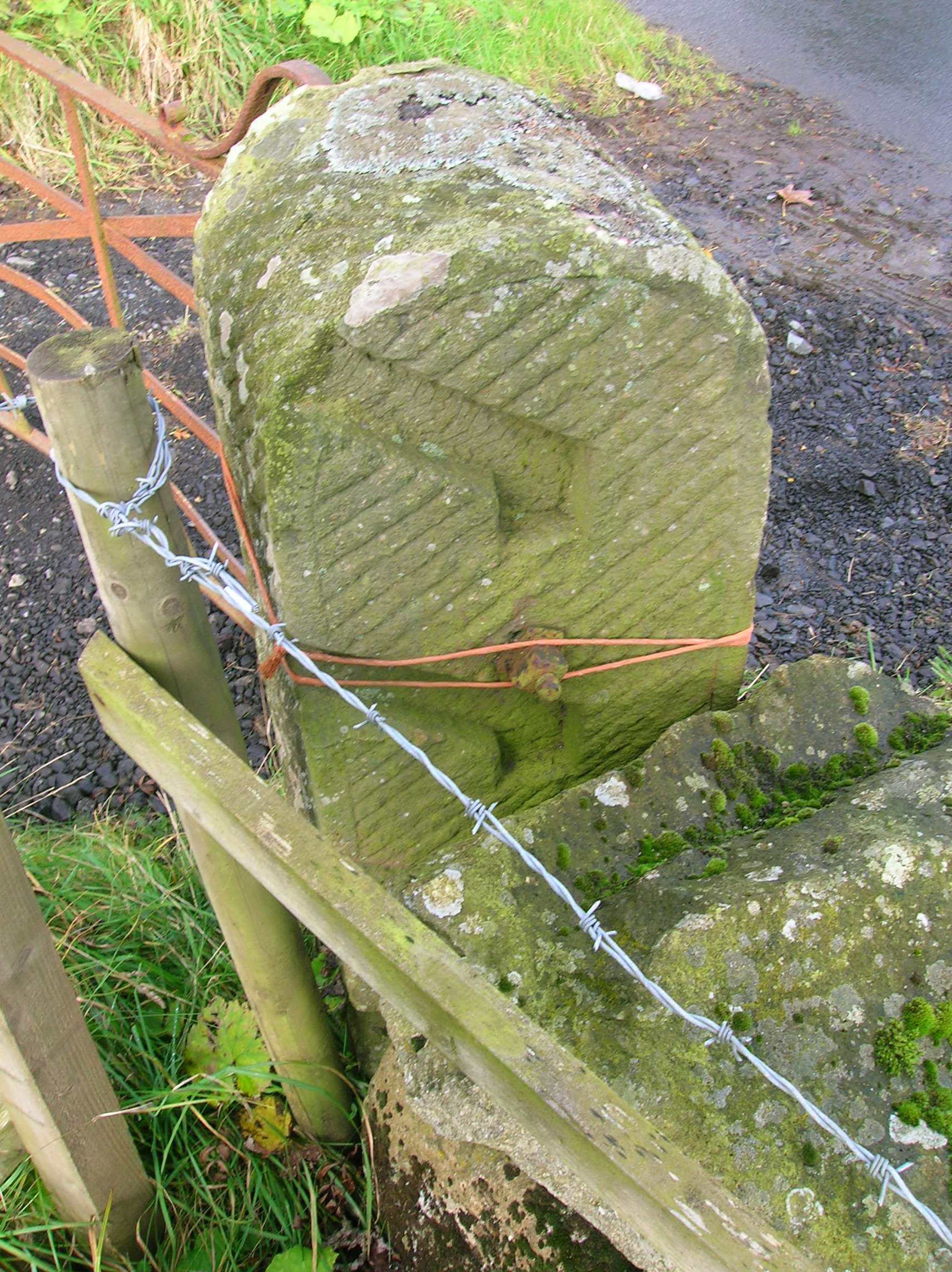
A number of old originally 'hingleless' stile posts suggests the long history of farming in the area

At Auchinskich, meaning Cleeves Cove, there is a natural cave mentioned as the "Elf House" about 183 feet (56 m) in length near the middle it expands into a large chamber, 35 feet (11 m) long by 12 feet (3.7 m), and 12 feet (3.7 m) in height.

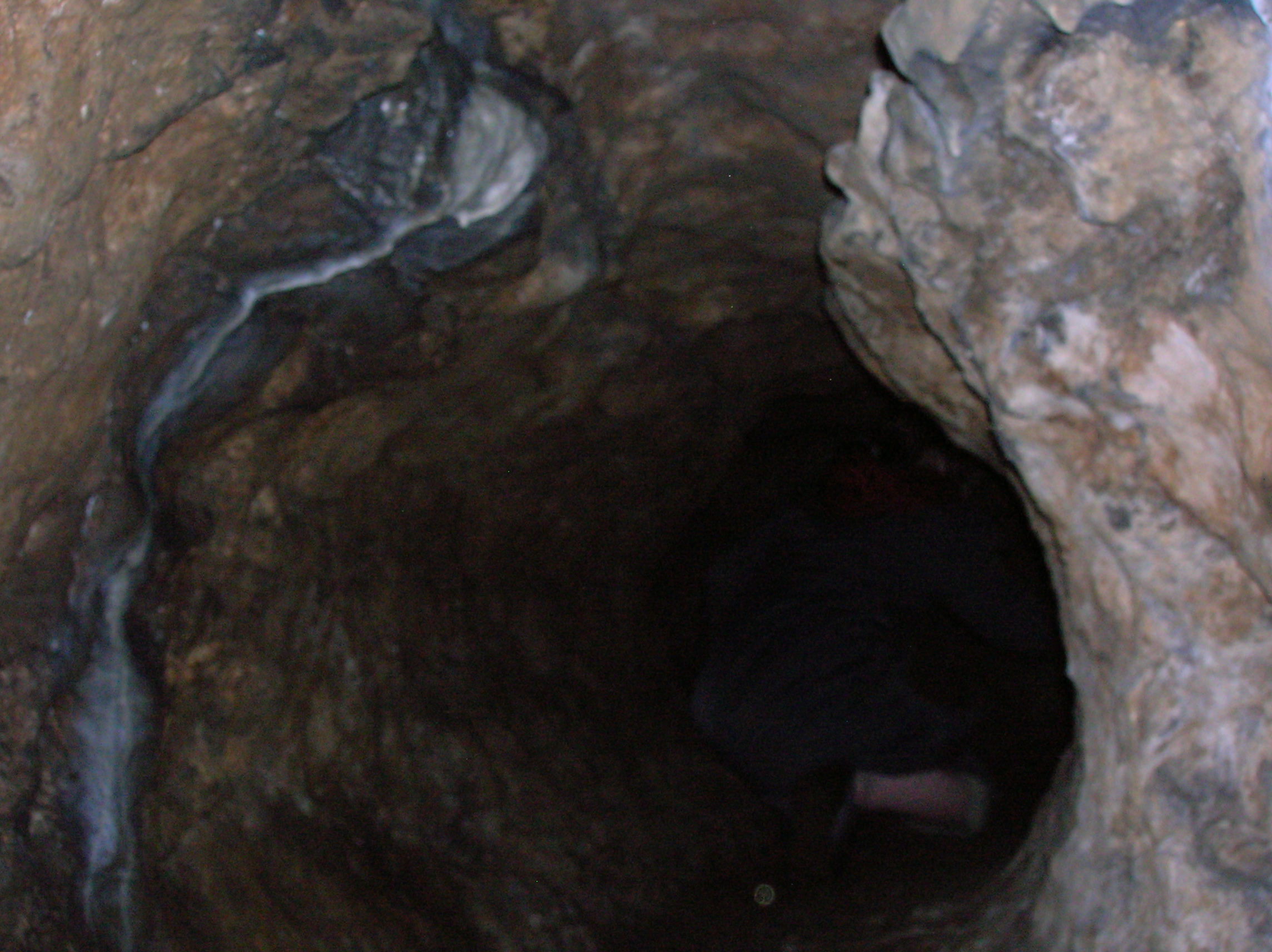
A passageway at Cleeves Cove, the 'Elf Hame,' showing the erosion activity of water and limestone deposition

In the reign of Charles II, it was said to be a refuge to the covenanters of this parish from the violence of their persecutors.

When David I (1082–1153) was crowned King of Scots, he brought in and created a high-ranking Norman aristocracy in his new kingdom. These Norman nobles were given lands creating in Scotland an influential Norman aristocracy.

One of these "nobles or knights", Hugh de Morville, was made Lord High Constable of Scotland and given lands in Cunninghame. De Morville probably then gave some of these lands or baronies to a relative a Walter de Lynne, to William de Blair, to William Kerr and to the Boyles of Kelburne.

The name Lynne then meaning "a waterfall," is first noted in the area of Dalry in the years 1200-1300 They were located here and had land and owned the Castle of Lin near the waterfall of the Calf.

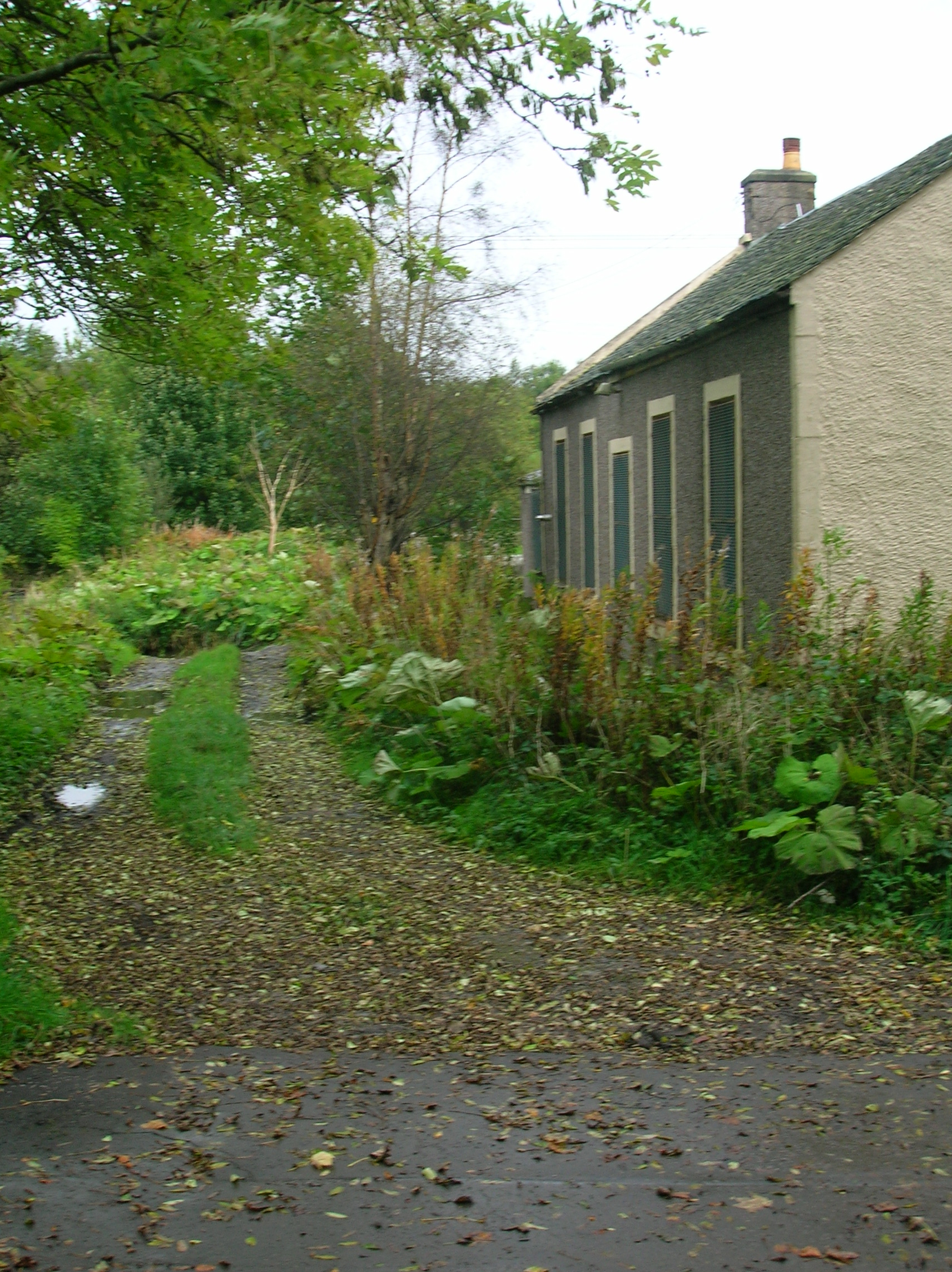
The old Dalry Cottage Hospital by the Rye Water Ford.

The name Blair at that time meant "a field clear of woods" and is recognised in the area in late 12th century when a Norman keep was within the barony of Blair. This was later replaced by the Blair castle.

Dalry was mentioned in 1226 as a "chapel of Ardrossan". The parish of Dalry was probably formed in 1279 when a "Henry, Rector of the Church of Dalry" appears in the Register of the Diocese of Glasgow. Two places of worship in the parish appear by the late 13th century. One on the east bank of the River Garnock at Kilcush, and the other on the west, located near the Old Glebe. This was the main parish church, it almost certainly dedicated to St. Margaret of Antioch, a 3rd or 4th century virgin martyr.

A Knights Templar stone coffin of an Ardrossan Baron was found when excavations were made to the Ardrossan Parish Church. It would most likely have been made by a French mason working on the construction of Kilwinning Abbey during the late 12th - early 13th centuries. "Templand" names derived from the word templar are to be found in the Dalry area.

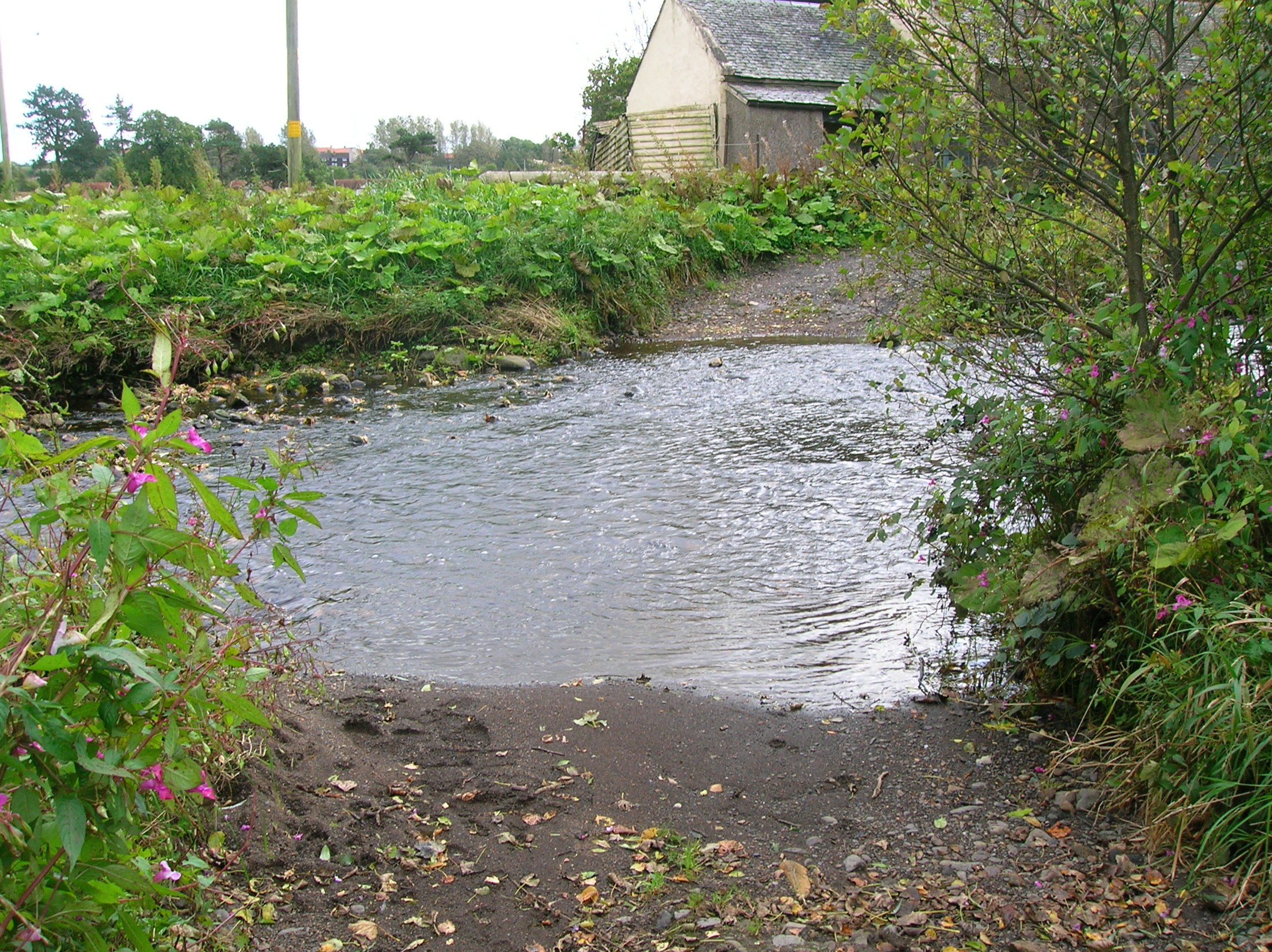
The Rye Water Ford, a rare survival in Ayrshire.

Lands including the area of Pitcon in Dalry were given by Robert the Bruce to his right-hand man Robert Boyd in 1316.

In the 15th century, the parish had five main baronies; Kelburne, Blair, Kersland, Lynn and Pitcon. These names are still reflected in some of the areas, farms, houses and surnames in the area. Kersland had a church school and ruined castle and is linked to the covenanter Robert Ker of Kersland.

The Rye Water’s source is among the nearby high hills. There is a spot here considered historically interesting, where the stream was crossed by a ford below Ryefield House. Before the creation of any bridges at Drakemire, this fording of the stream had been considered by some to be very fun and interesting. This can be seen in the song "Comin' Thro' the Rye", which commemorates the scene.

"Gin a body meet a body Comin’ through the Rye,
Gin a body kiss a body Need a body cry ?,
Ilka lassie has her laddie, Nane, they say, ha’e I !
Yet a’ the lads they smile on me,
When comin’ through the Rye."

A Rye Water ford still exists to this day (2008).

A Cholera pit is located in a field near the Caaf Bridge on the town side of the Caaf Water.

=== Broadlie House ===
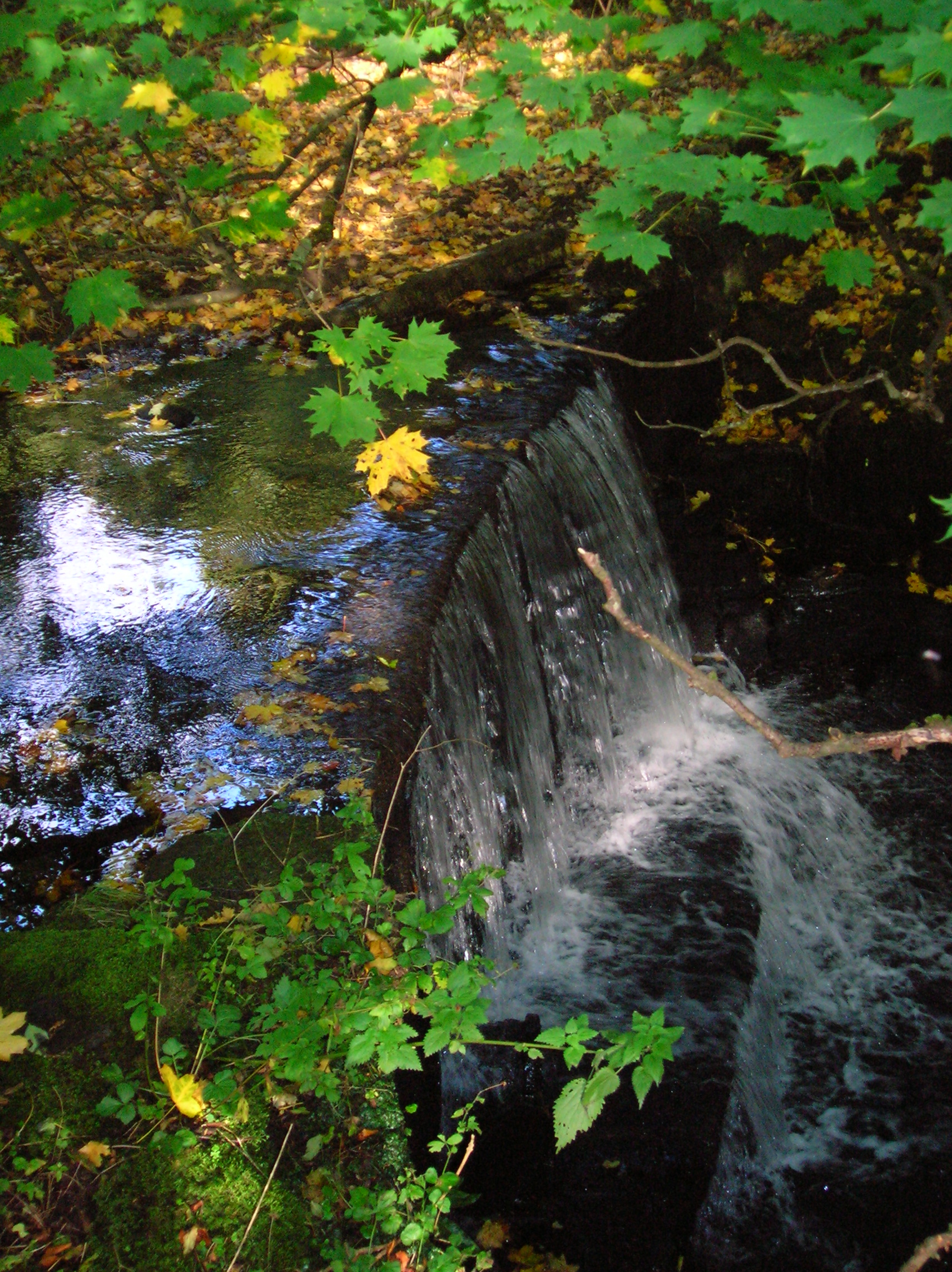
The cast iron pipe which took water to the turbine house can just be seen bottom left.

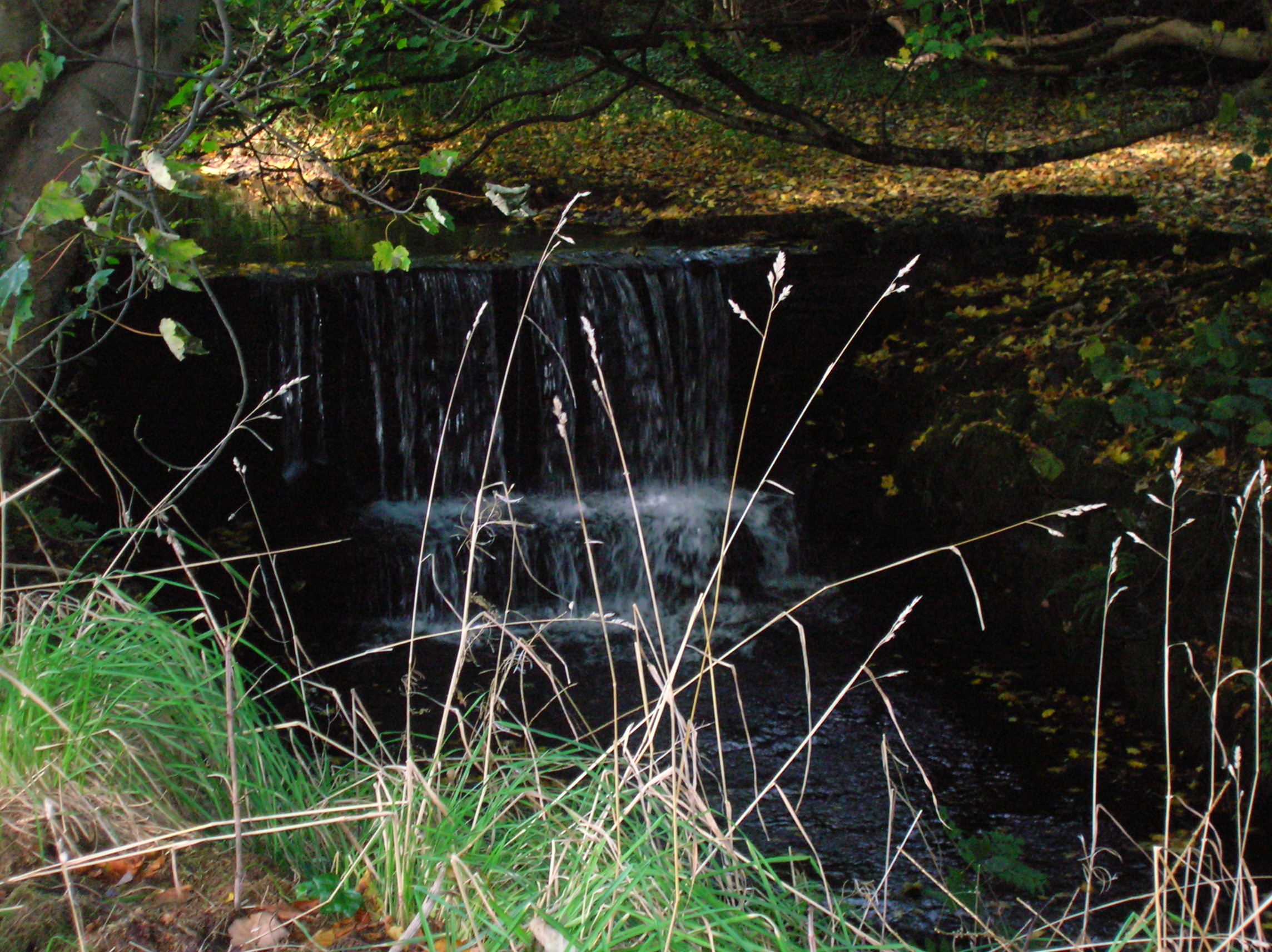
A frontal view of the dam.

In 1892, John Fulton installed one of the first hydroelectric plants in Ayrshire, generating electricity for Broadlie House. The dam still exists (2008) and can be seen on the Putyan Burn close to a pedestrian bridge that gave views of the installation to visitors. The water was carried downstream to a turbine house through a cast iron pipe.

=== Doggartland House ===
This house derives its name from 'Dogger'. Dogger is Scots for a course ironstone, which has been mined in the area as witnessed by waste bings below Ryefield and at Flashwood. A fine, but now redundant, cast iron bridge crosses the Rye Water at Doggartland.

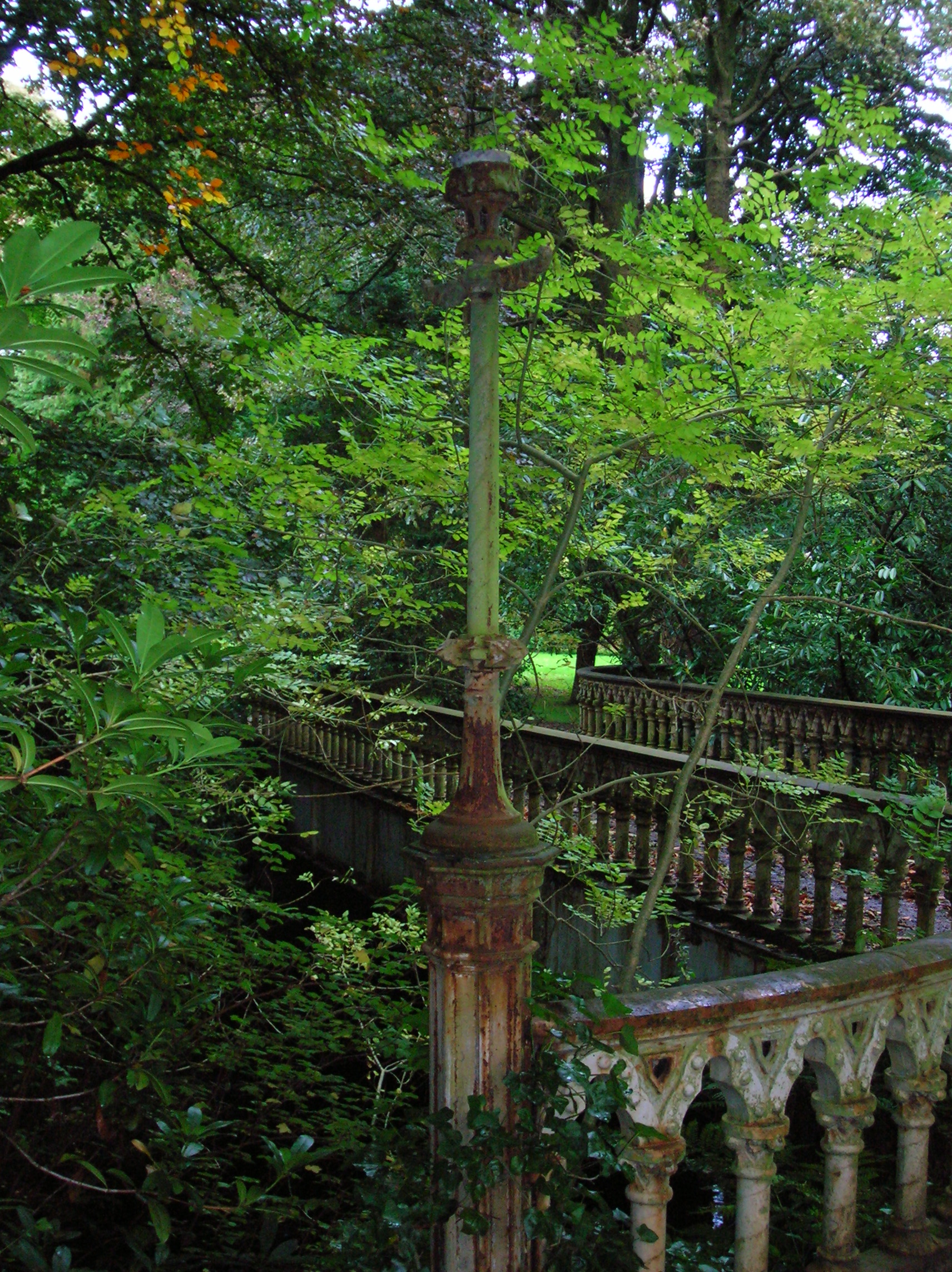
Detail of an old gas light on the Doggartland Bridge.

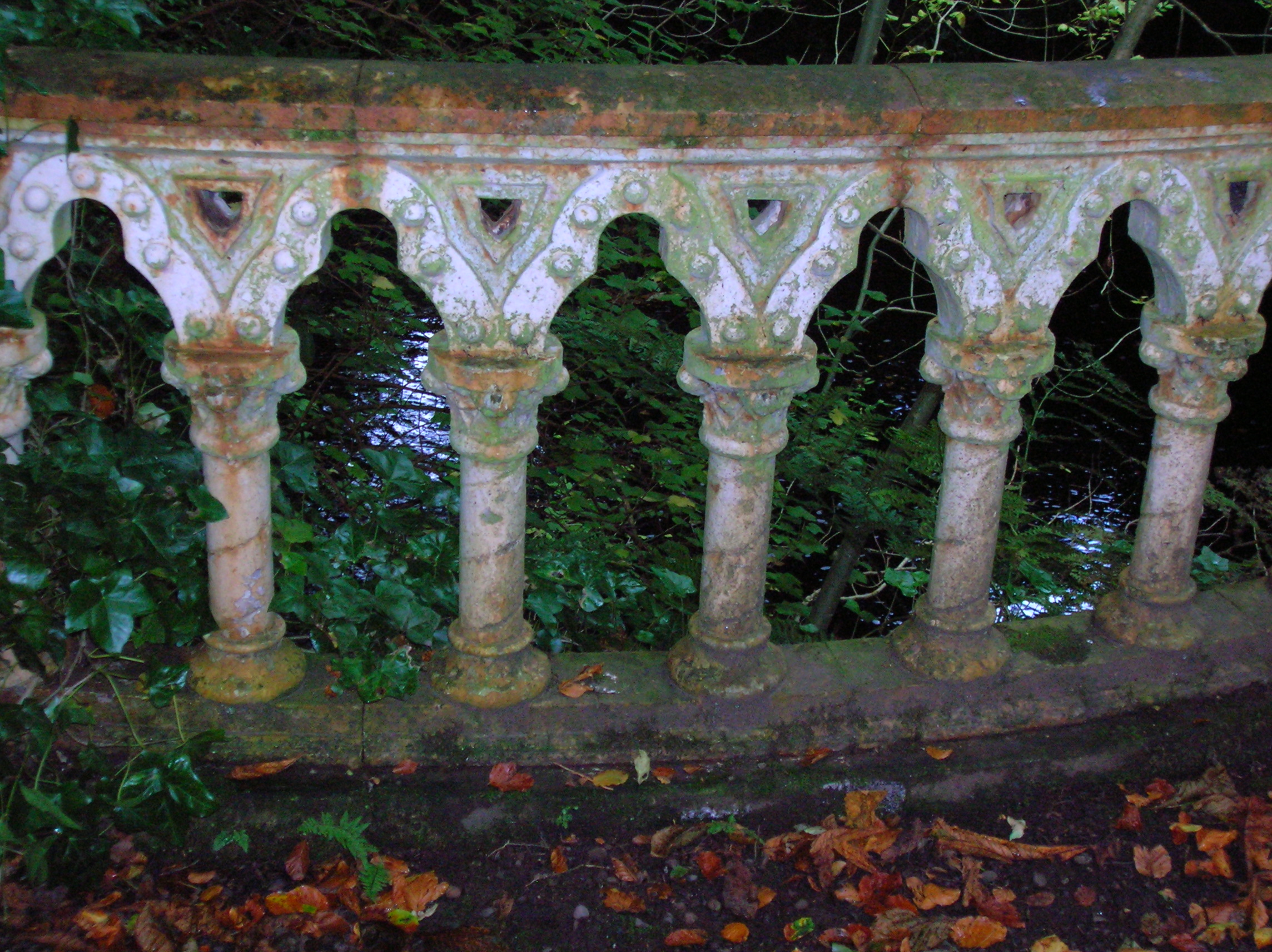
Detail of the cast iron railings at the Doggartland Bridge.

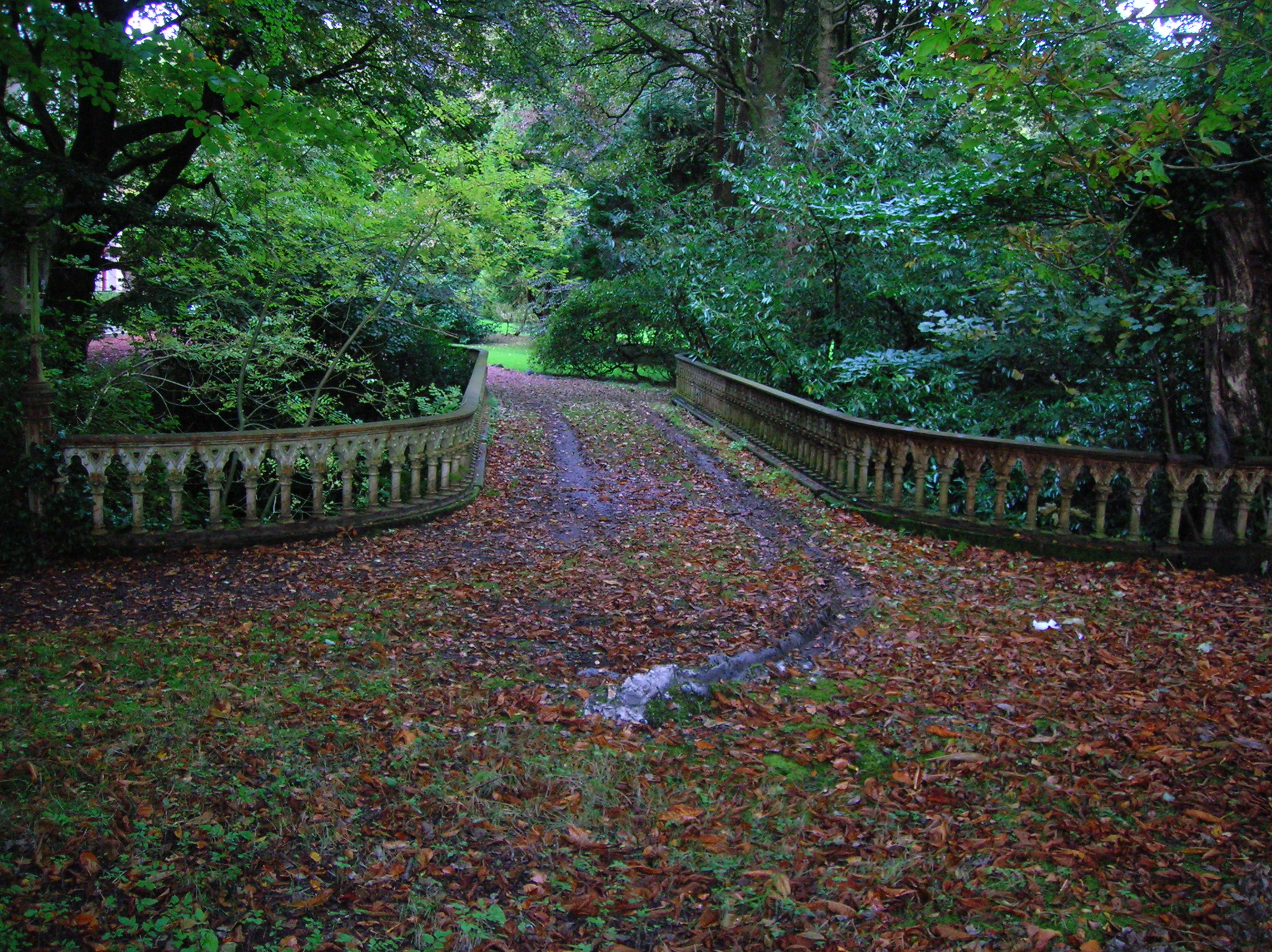
The Doggartland Bridge.

=== Lords of Lynn ===
The barony of Lynn was created from lands inherited about 1204 from Hugh de Morville. It reportedly was first held by Walter de Lynne, who signed the 1296 Ragman Roll. According to Douglas, the family bore the name Lynne long before coming to Ayrshire. If, as Douglas reports however, the family line is Robert de Lynne appearing in 1207 (Perthshire), William de Lynne appearing in 1246 (Perthshire), and Walter de Lynne appearing in 1296 (Ayrshire), one would expect William (or perhaps even Robert), rather than William's son Walter, to be the de Morville heir, first Lord of Lynn in Dalry, and progenitor of the Lynns of that Ilk. In any case, the Lynns held the property from about 1204 until 1532, when they sold it to the Boyds of Kilmarnock. Even then, however, they retained use of 16 acres of the barony or "dominical lands", which acres were "called Burnesyd, Garden and Lyne Knoll in the town and territory of Lyne, bailliary of Cunningham and sheriffdom of Ayr".

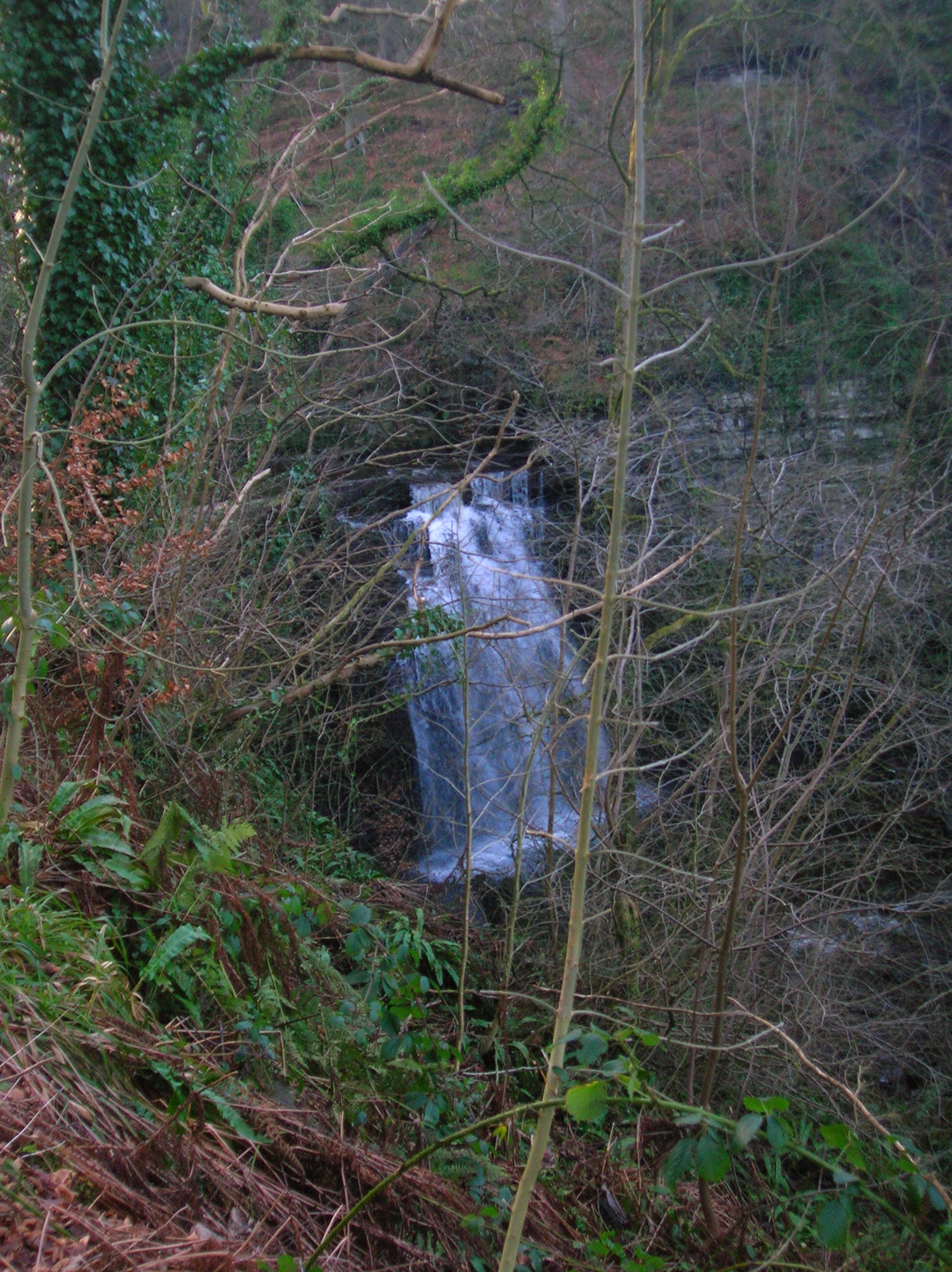
The waterfall on the Caaf Water at Lynn Glen.

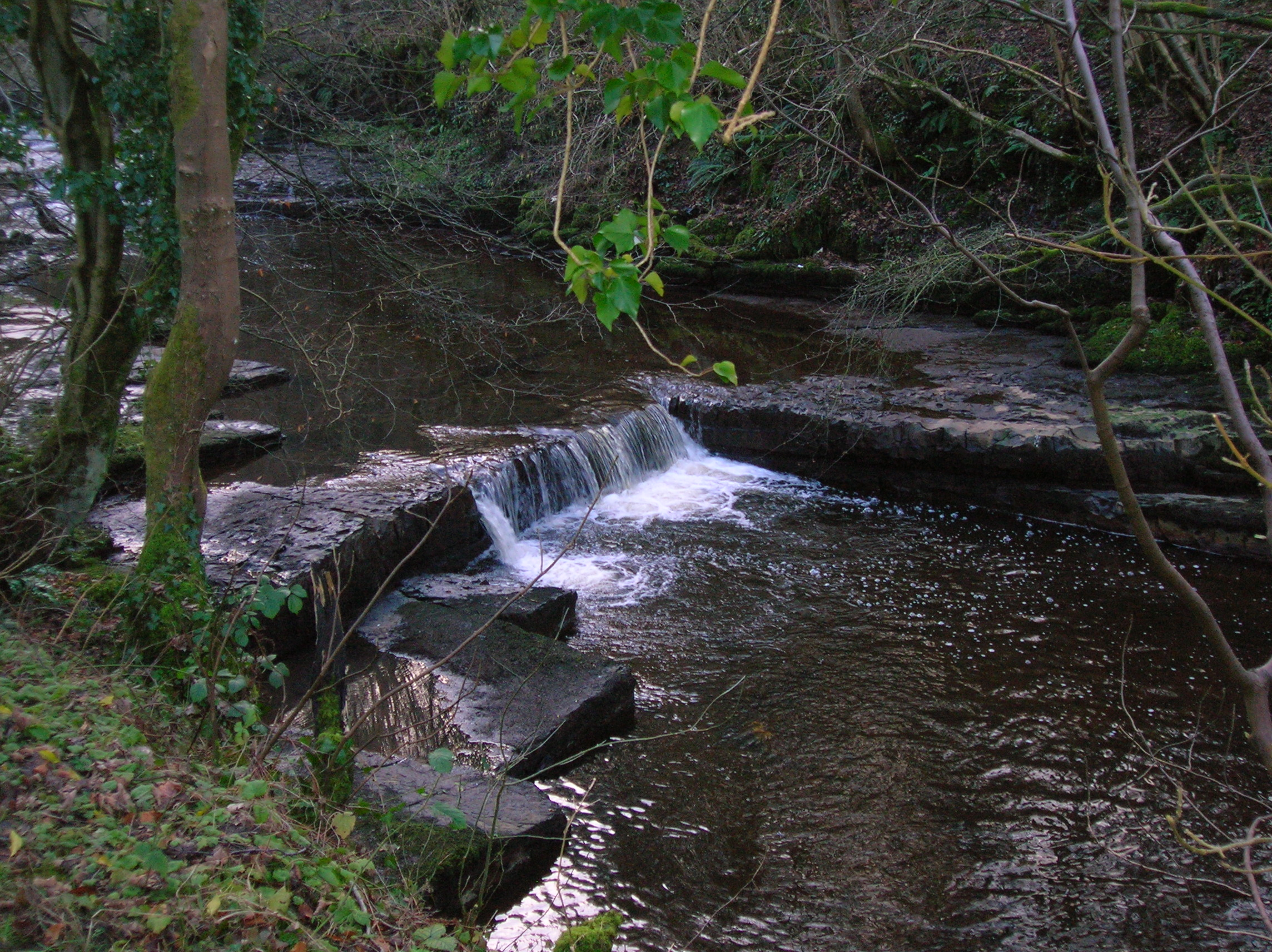
A small waterfall on the Caaf Water at Lynn Glen.

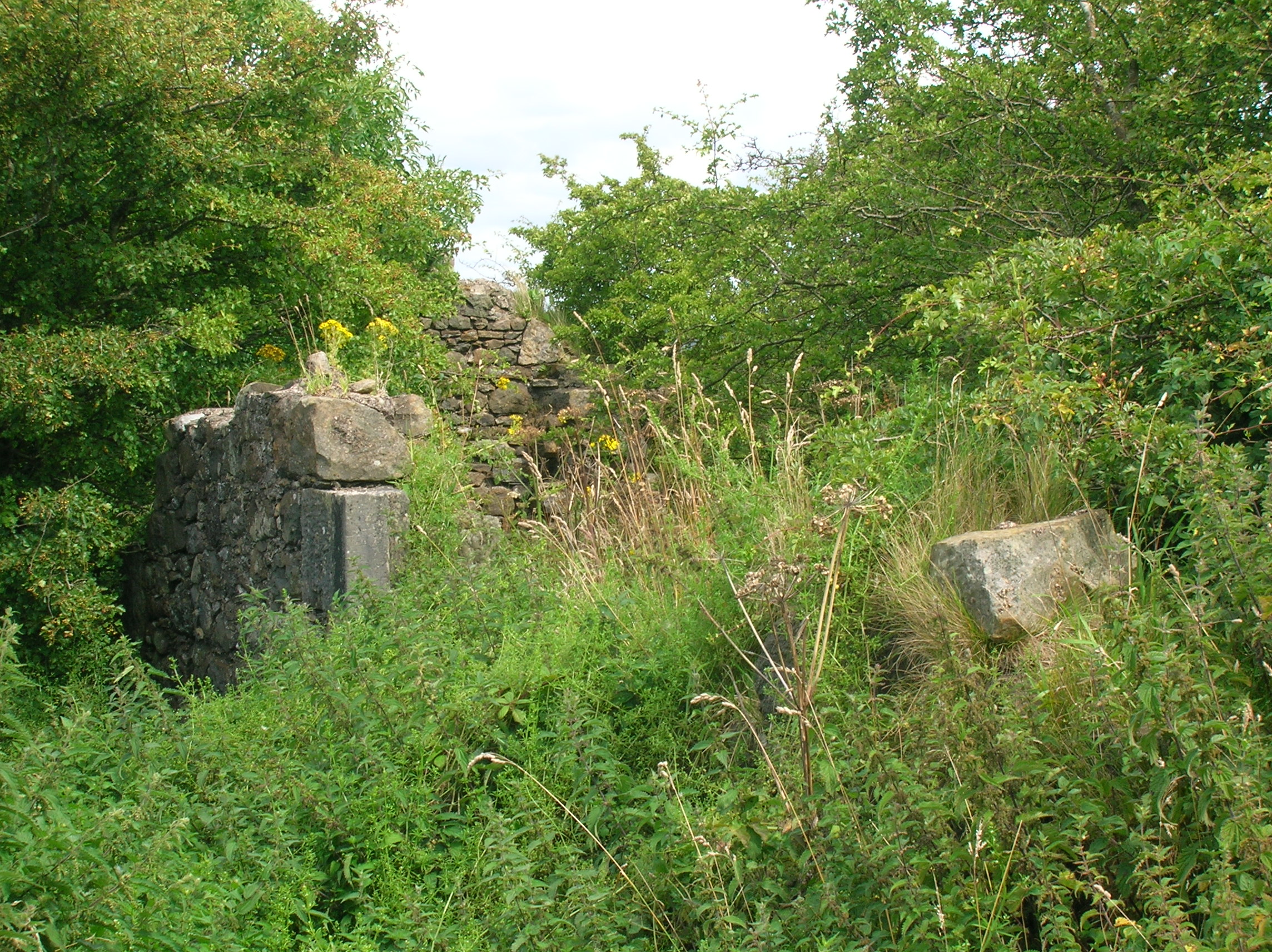
Lynncraigs Farm ruins on the old Drumastle Mill to Dalry route.

During this period, the family also owned Baidland on the north-western side of Dalry, Highlees just south of Dundonald, and the estate of Bourtreehill near Irvine. In 1385, the Laird of Lyne rented Baidland to the Cunninghams for one silver penny, then an average week's wages (this being the only known record of Lynns owning Baidland). In 1452, Andrew Lyn, Lord of that Ilk, gave a charter for Highlees to William Hunter of Arnele "for services rendered and to be rendered" (the Lynns remained superiors of Highlees for more than two centuries, their last recorded title being in 1668). In 1505, Andrew Lyne received a charter for Bourtreehill from Robert Frances, Lord of Stane (the last mention of the Lynns of that Ilk in Bourtreehill being in 1608). In 1614 John Lyn of that Ilk is recorded as the lord superior of the lands of 'Hileis' in the parish of Dalry and Patrick Hunter of Hunterston was his baillie.

In 1522, the 16-acre mains of the barony of Lynn were conveyed in a charter from John Lyne of that Ilk to John Lyne of Bourtreehill, described therein as the "... dominical lands of Lyne called Burnesyd, with a house, garden, and Lyne Knoll." In 1532, John Lyn "for a sum of money to him paid, sold" to Thomas Boyd a portion of Lyn ("forty-shilling land of old extent", the latter term referring to a former valuation). Nevertheless, the Lynns continued to hold the 16-acre mains of the property: in 1583, the mains were conveyed by Laurence Lyn (of Bourtreehill) to William Lyn, his son and heir apparent; on this occasion, the mains were further described as "... dominical lands of Lyne together with the house called Burnesyd with the garden thereof and Lyne Knoll lying in the town and territory of Lyne bailliary of Cunningham and sheriffdom of Ayr" (emphasis added).

The property included the beautiful Lynn Falls or Lynn Spout, lying in a glen said to be the dwelling of witches, elves, and fairies. However, that same glen is the location of Peden's Point, where the noted Covenanting minister Alexander Peden preached to outdoor conventicles from a pinnacle forming a natural pulpit overlooking the water above the falls. The Lynns themselves were Presbyterians, and it may be that they willingly made their land available for the preaching of the reformed faith.

The Lords of Lynn became extinct as a landed family in Dalry, but they were remembered in Ayrshire folklore as "a beloved aristocracy that came, lingered a while, and vanished."

Linn House

Built for the Crichtons in 1812, this house was a small mansion house by 1858 with a vaguely 'Elizabethan' appearance. It was purchased by the Neilsen family of Chapeltoun in 1924 and sold by them in 1960. The house lay empty for a number of years and was demolished so that the site could be redeveloped as a housing estate. Only the gatepiers remain, leading onto the Dalry to Kilwinning road.

== Legends of Lynn Glen ==
=== Views of Craig Mill and Lynn Glen ===
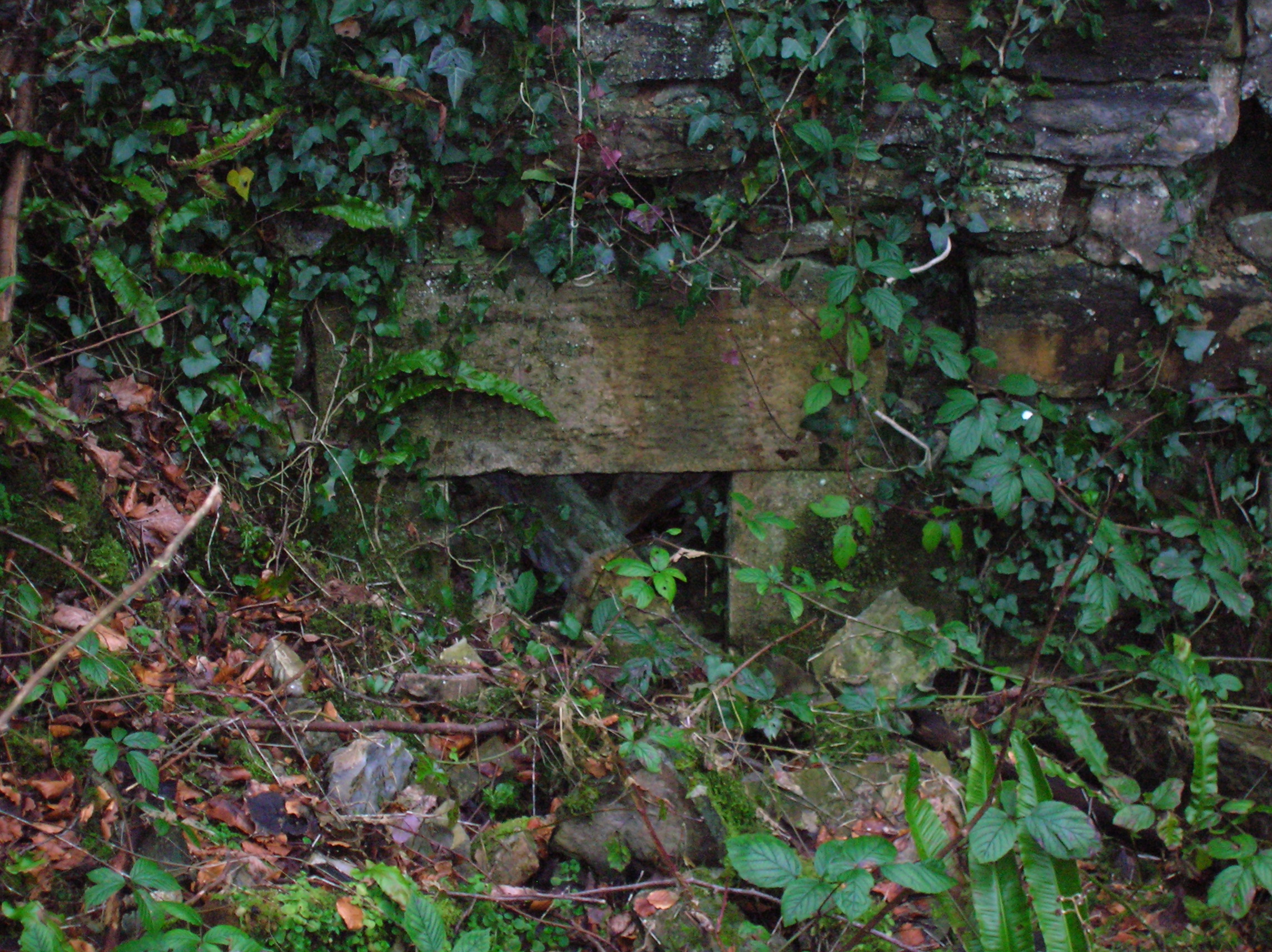
Detail of an opening in the gable end of the old mill.

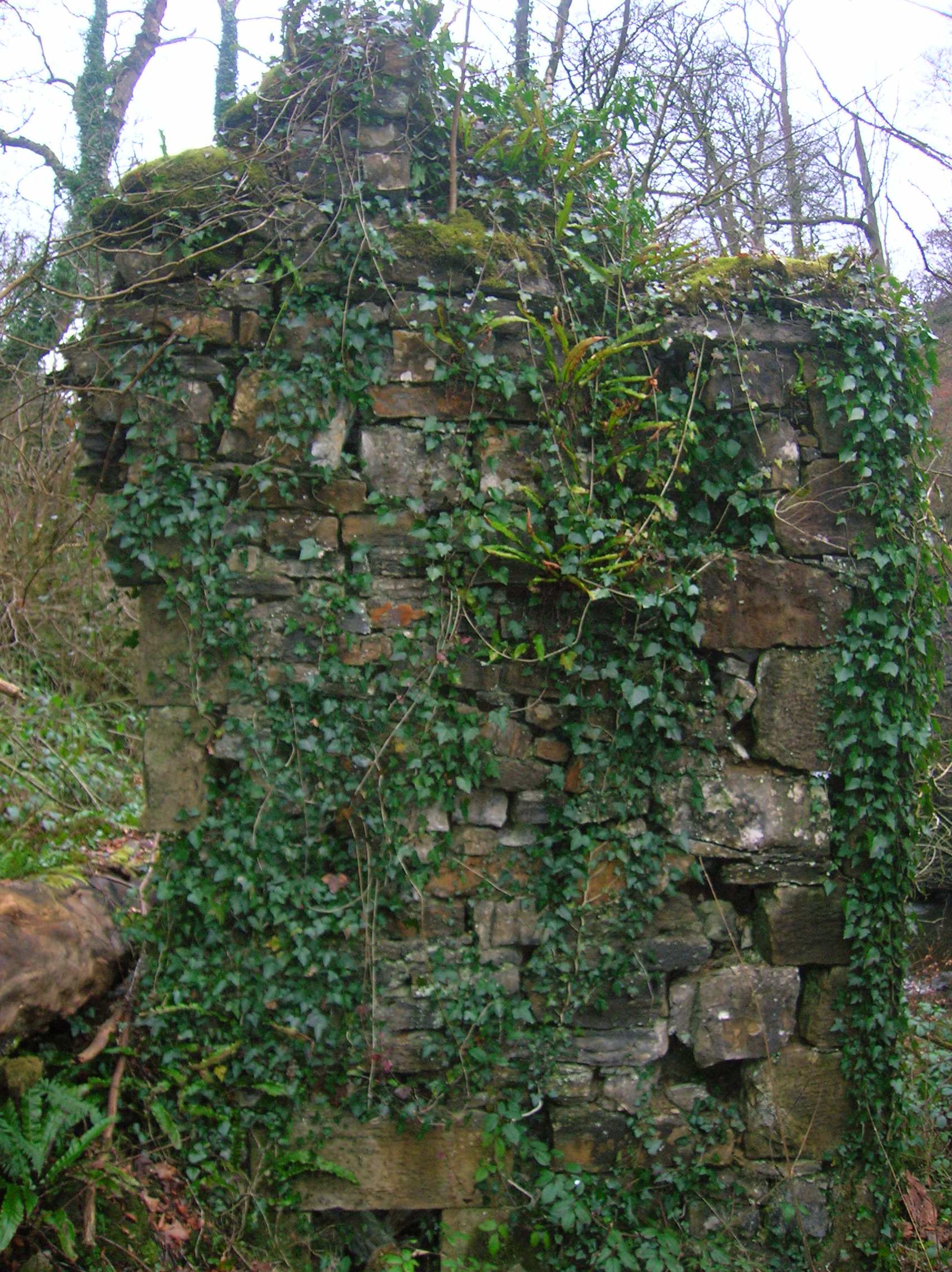
The old mill's gable end facing Linn Spout.

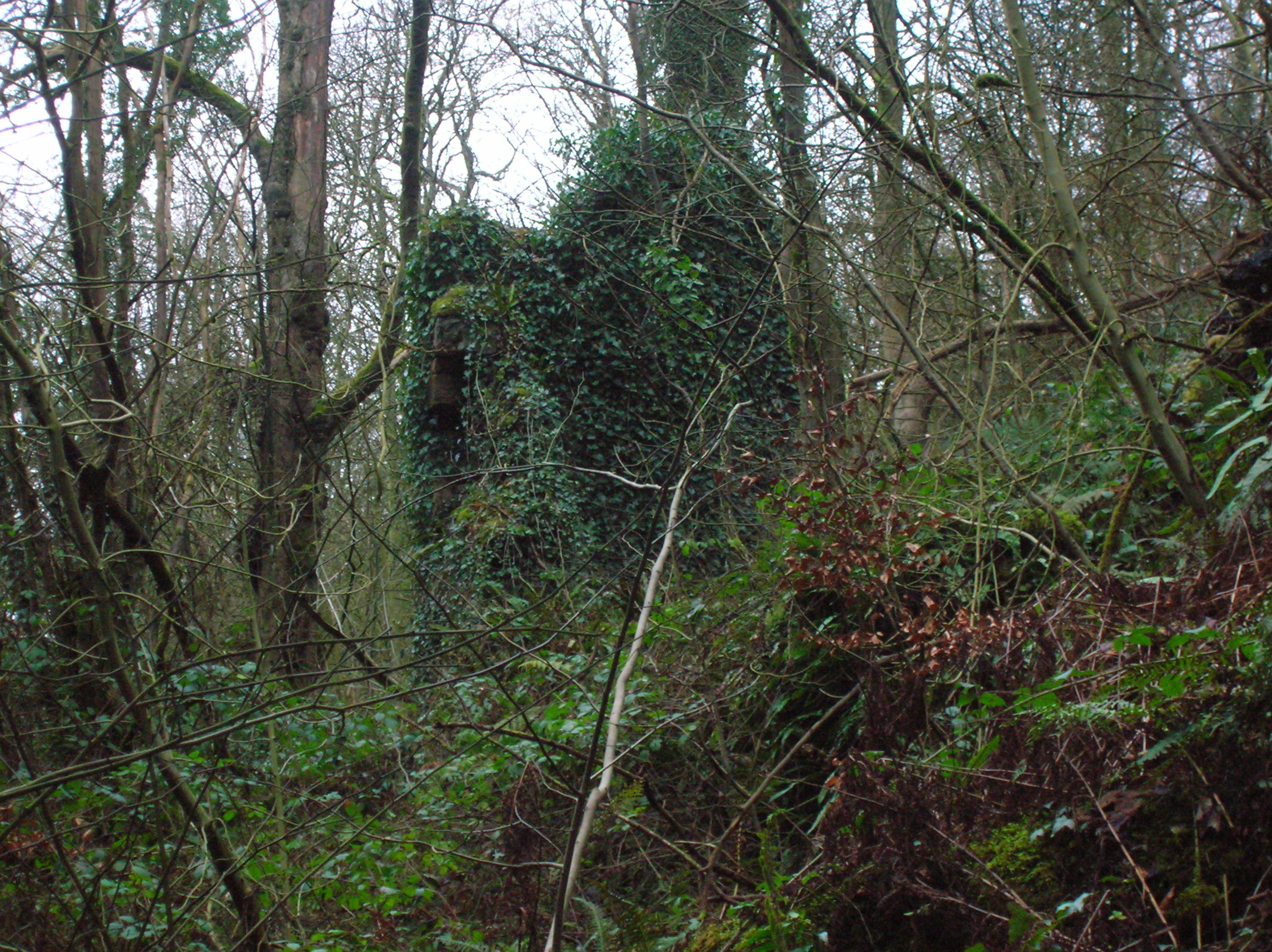
The Craig Mill ruins from below Linn Spout. This mill was associated with Kilwinning Abbey, together with Garnock and Sevenacres mills.

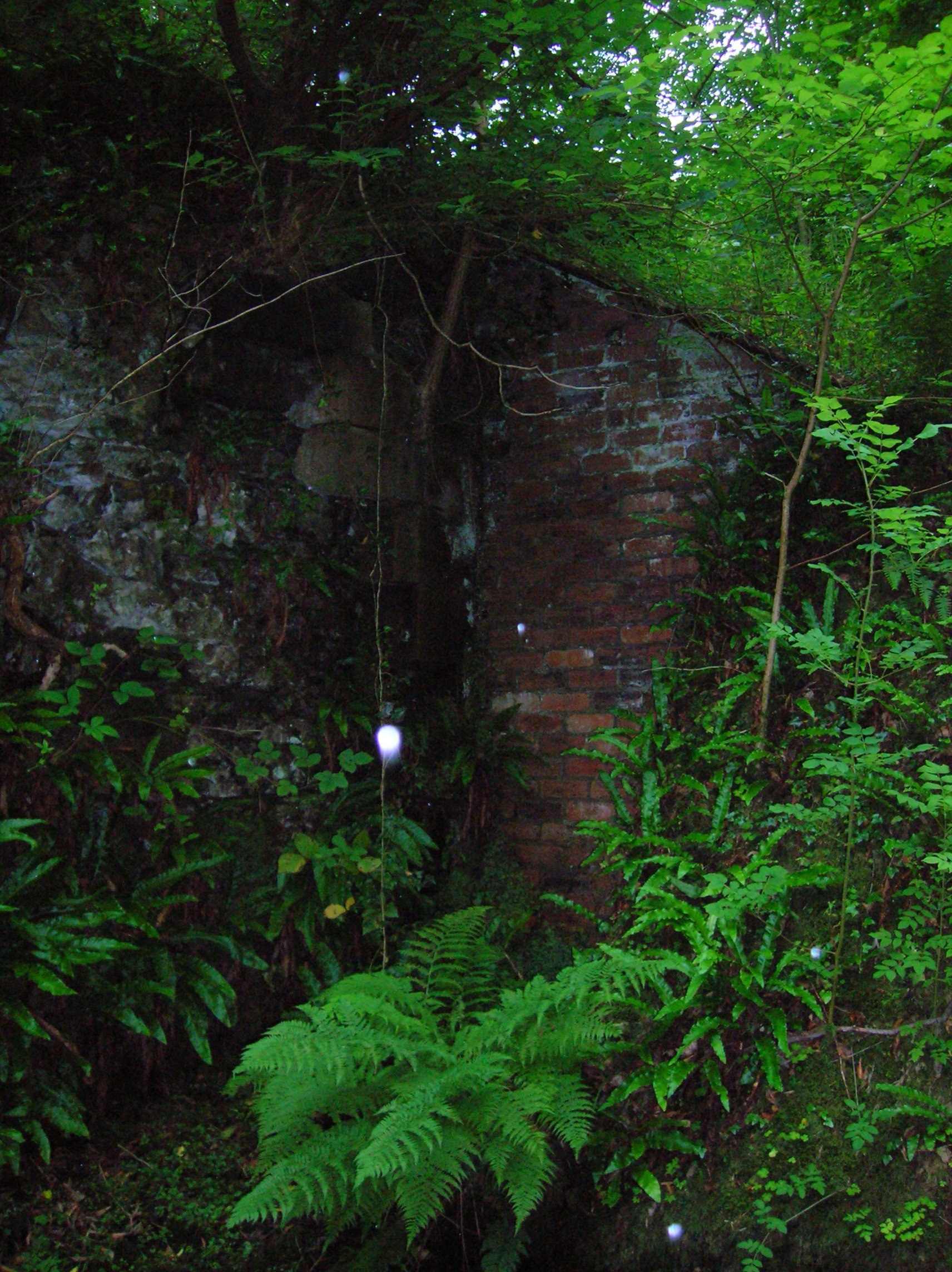
Remains of the mill lade and what may have been a later roofed turbine house.

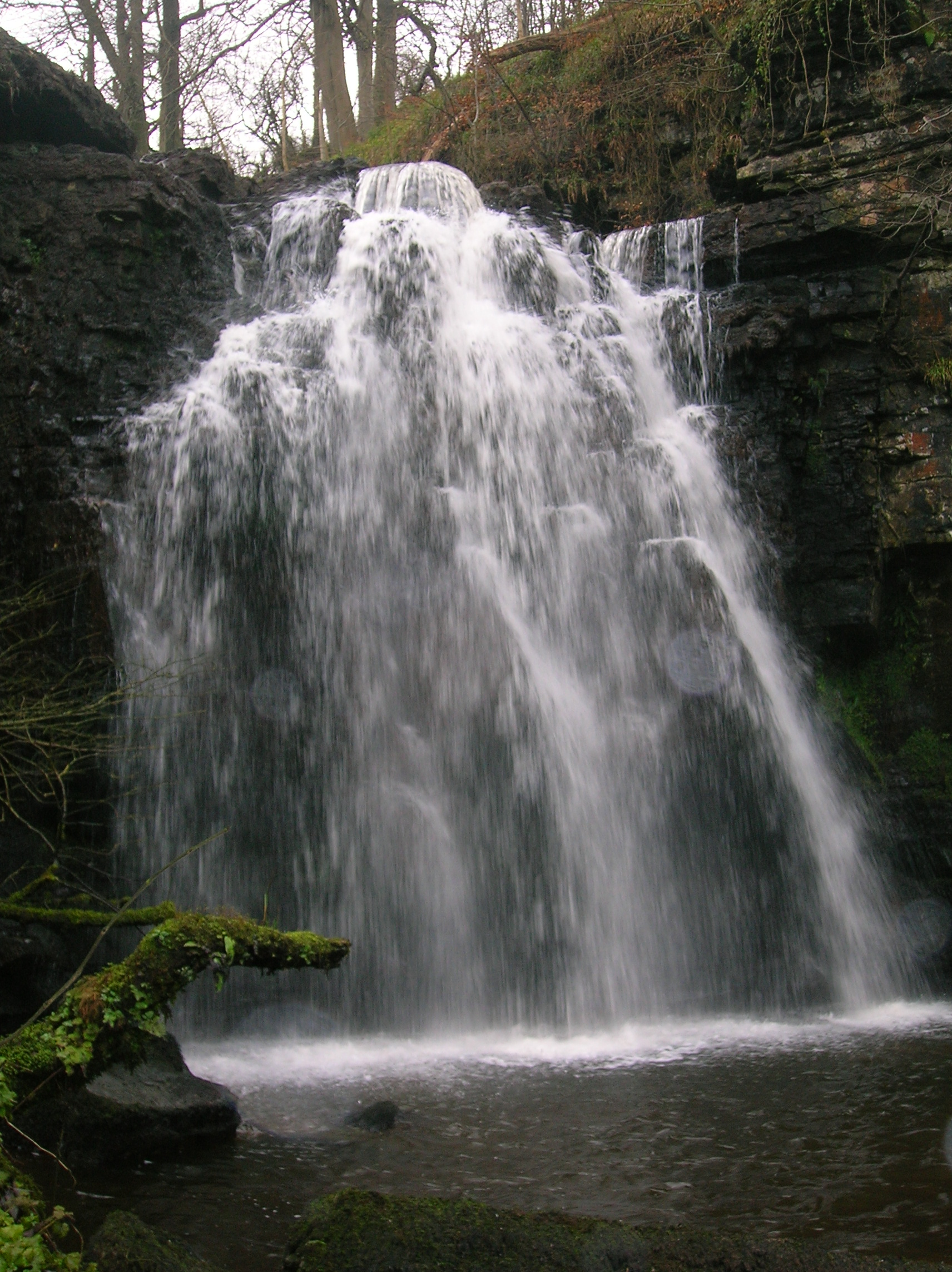
Linn Spout on the Caaf Water.

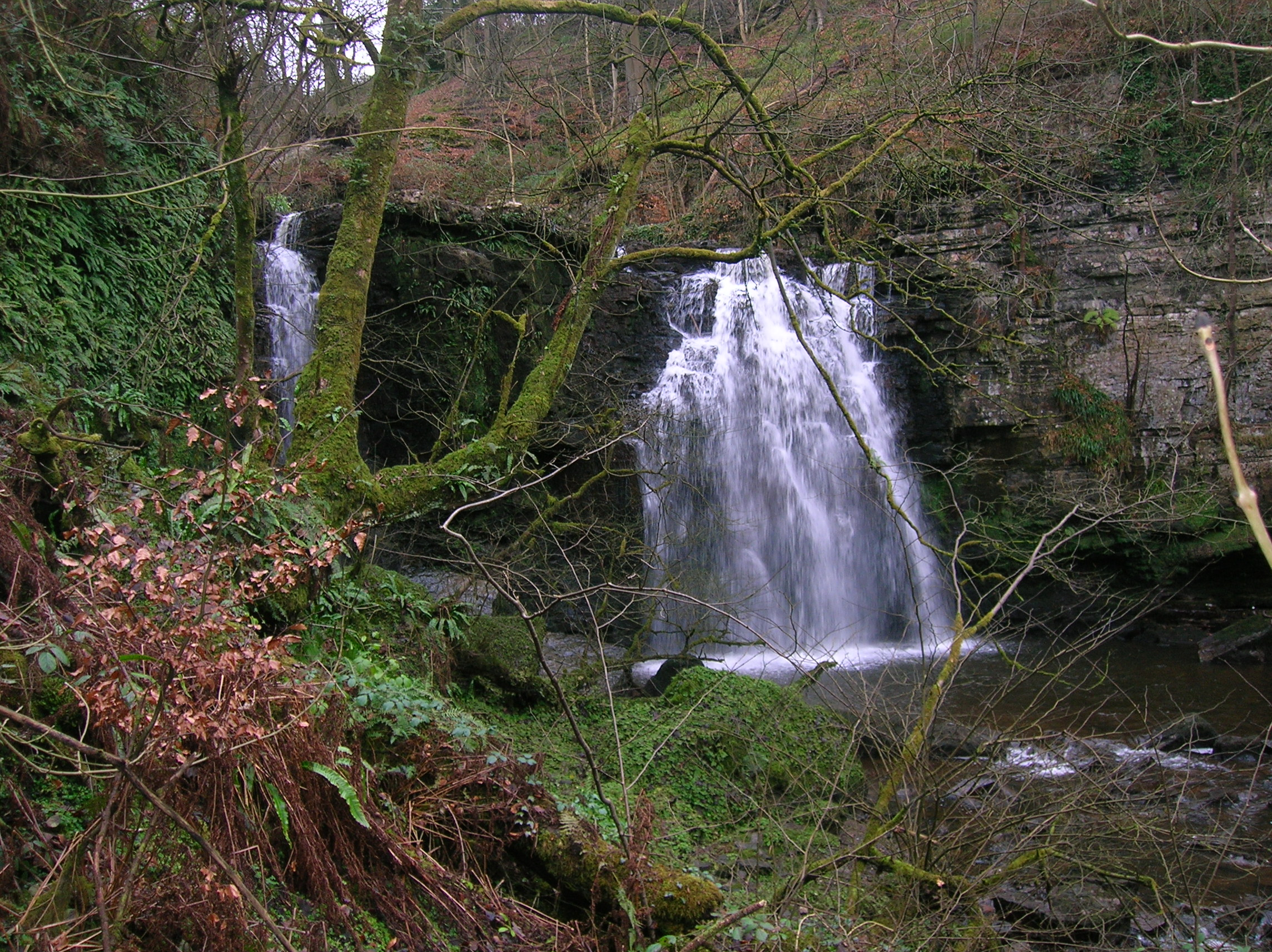
Linn Spout on the Caaf Water; illustrating the thick limestone deposits in this area.

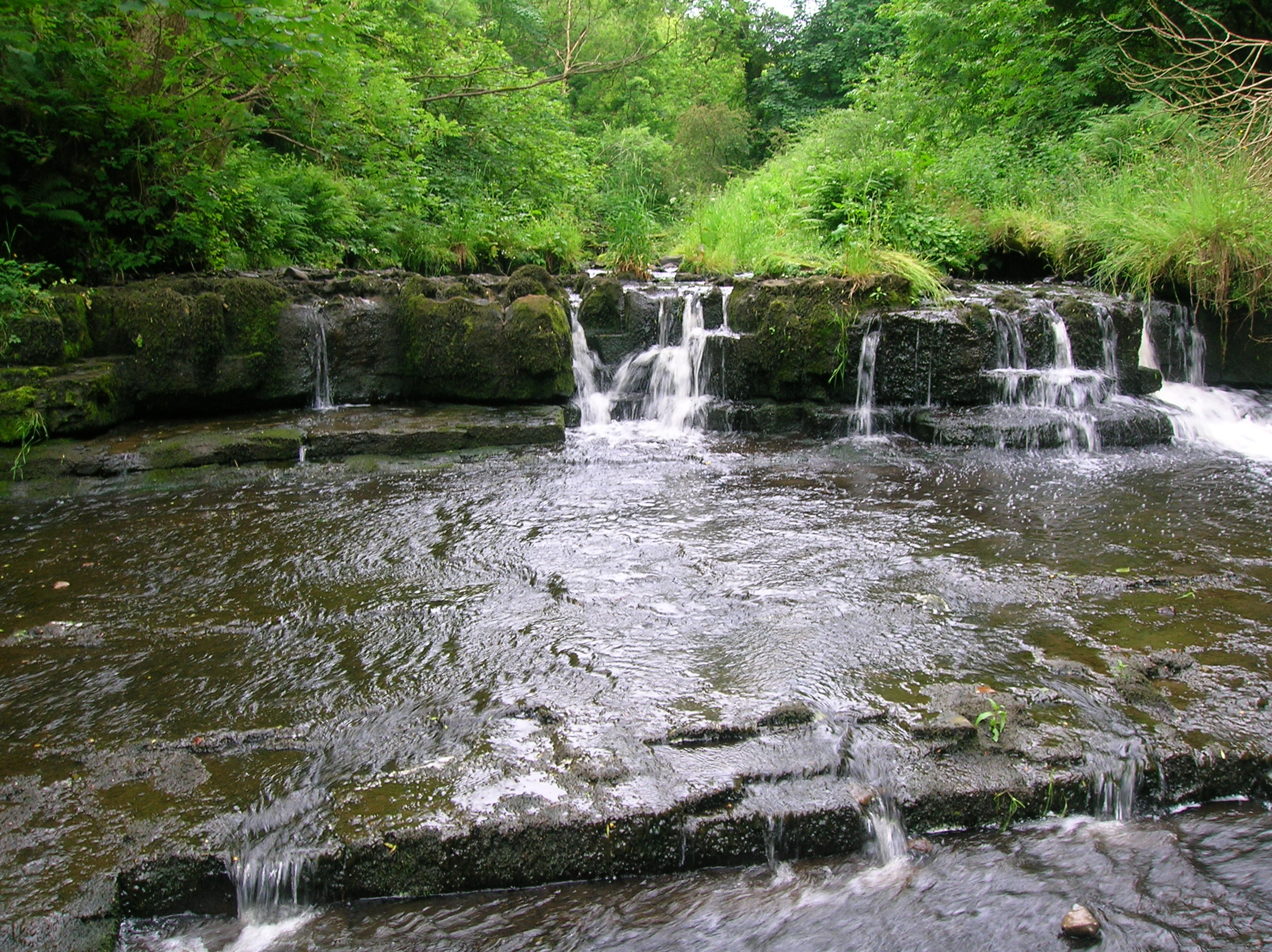
The Caaf Water running over limestone. A good site for rock-cut basins.

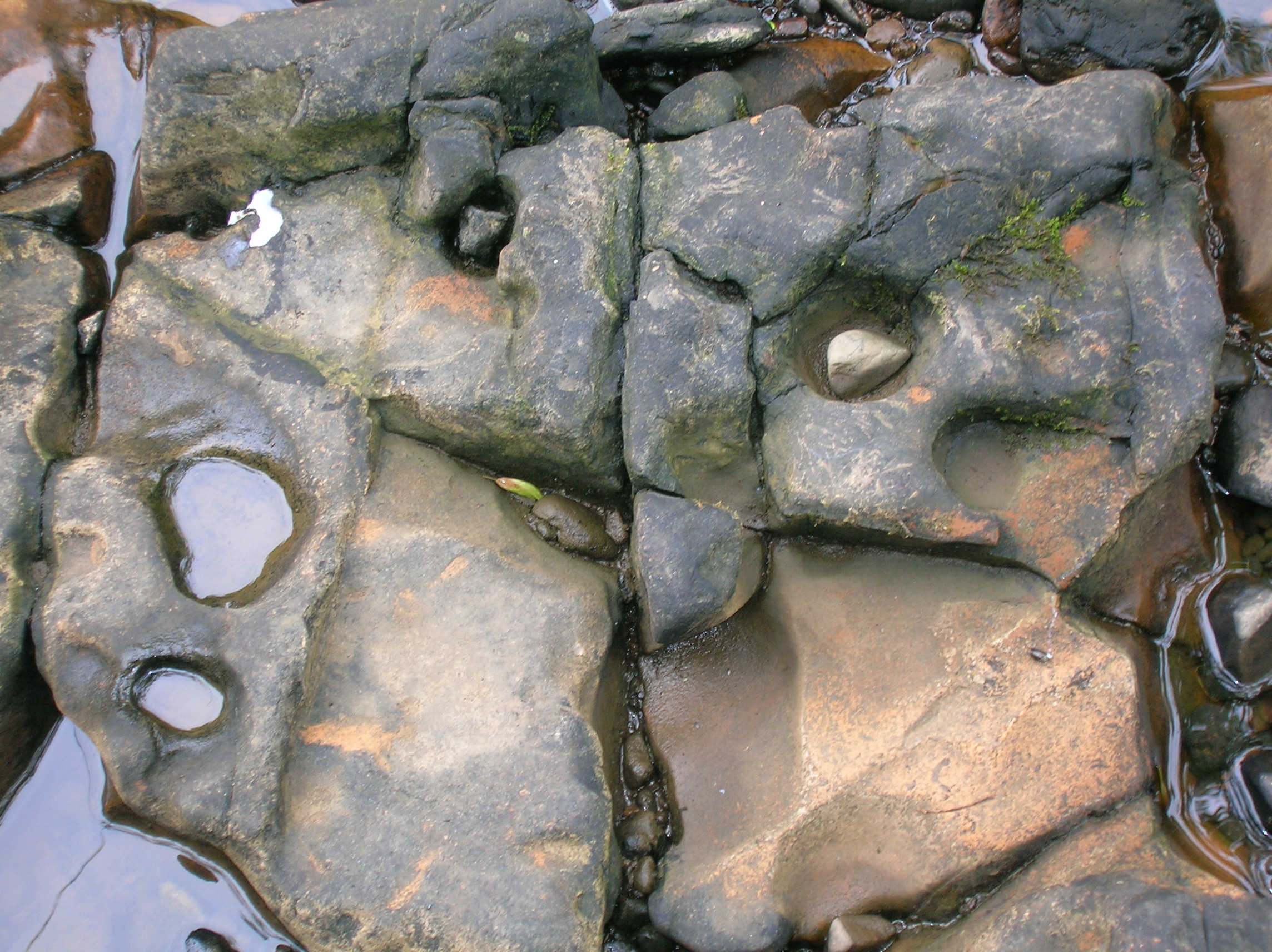
Rock-cut basins with the eroding pebble in situ.

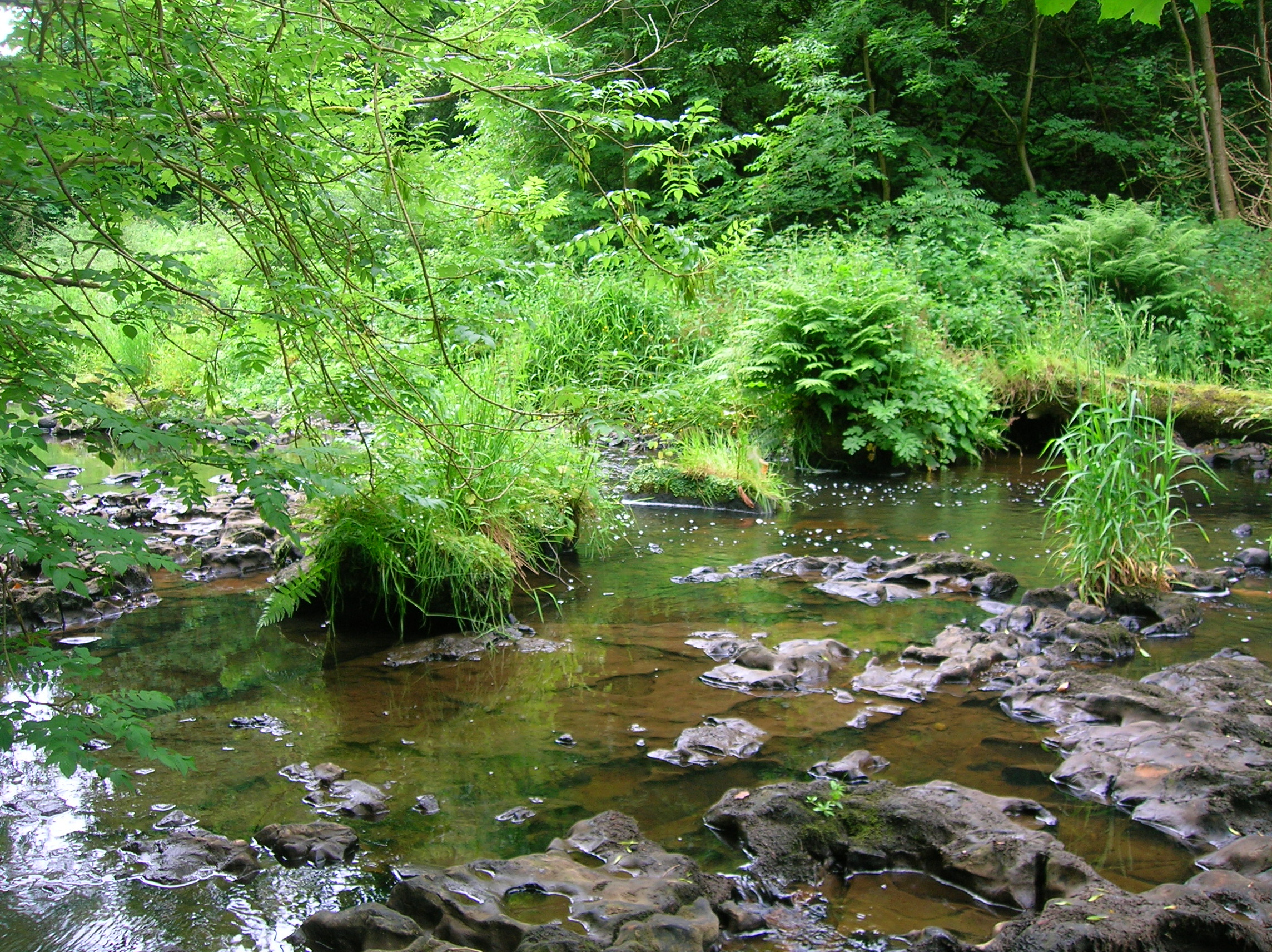
The remains of an old footbridge near the entrance to the old lade.

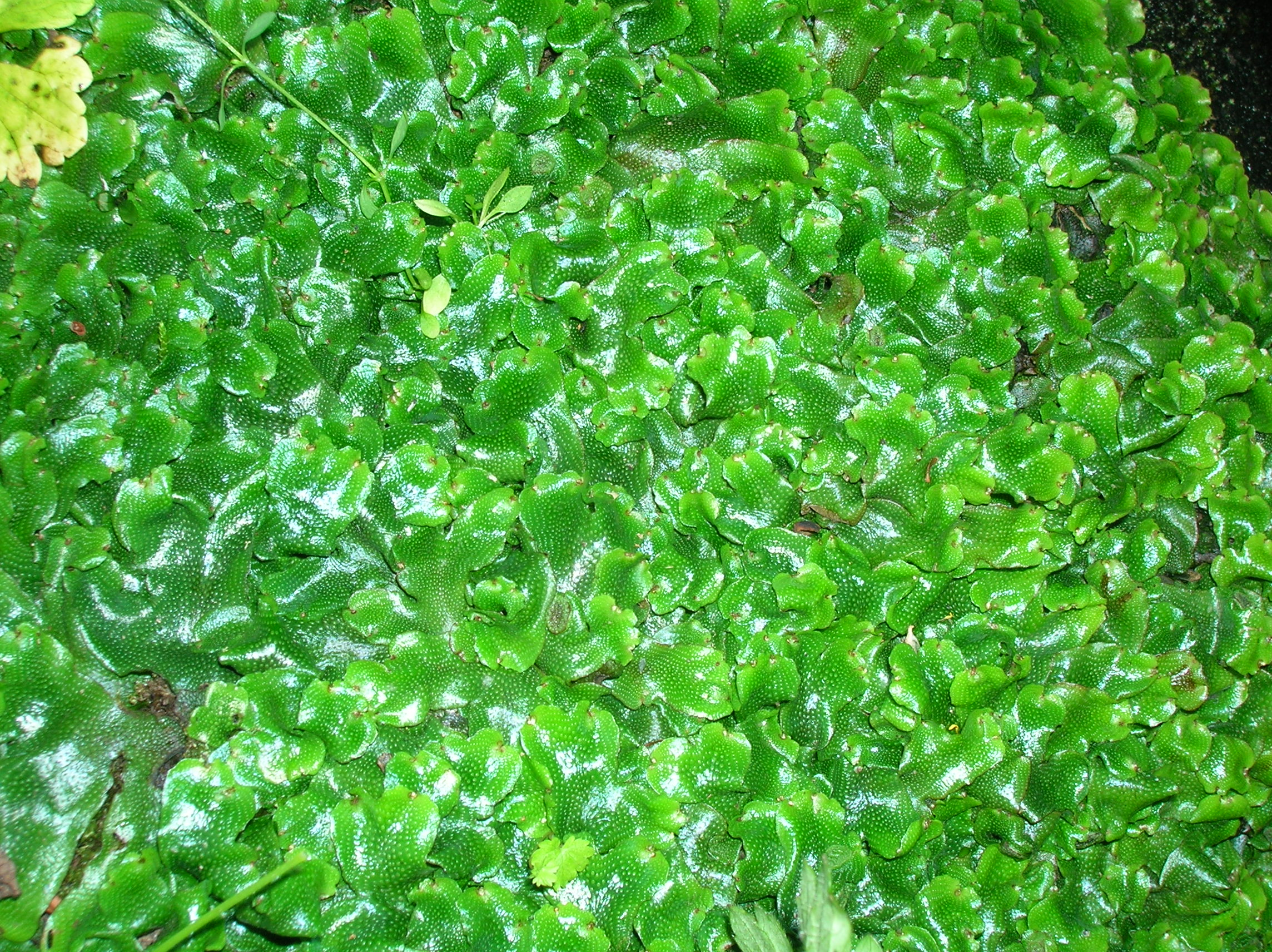
The Liverwort Conocephalum conicum on a rock in the Caaf Water.

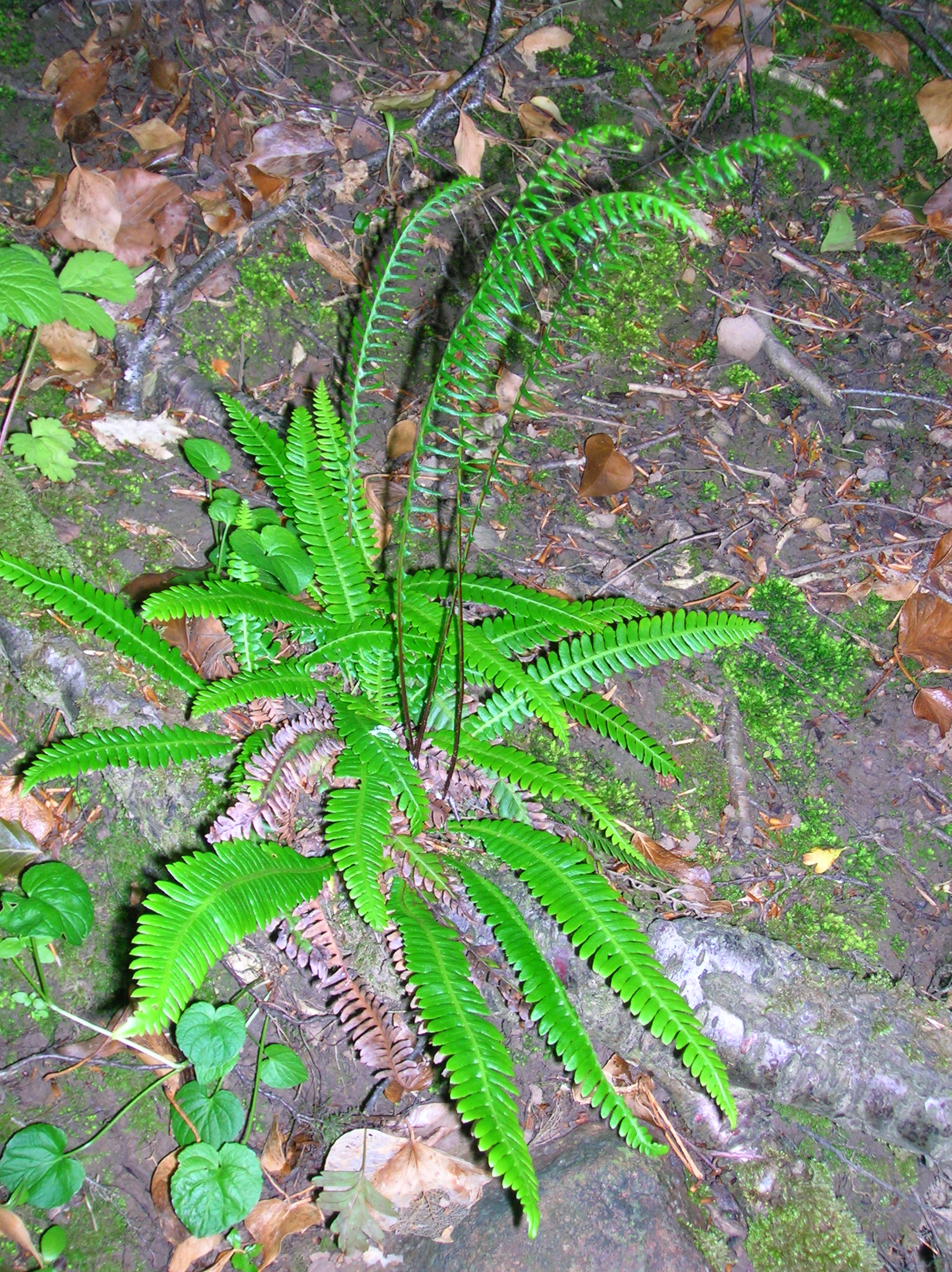
Hard Fern (Blechnum spicant) in the Linn Glen. Note the vertical fertile fronds typical of this species.

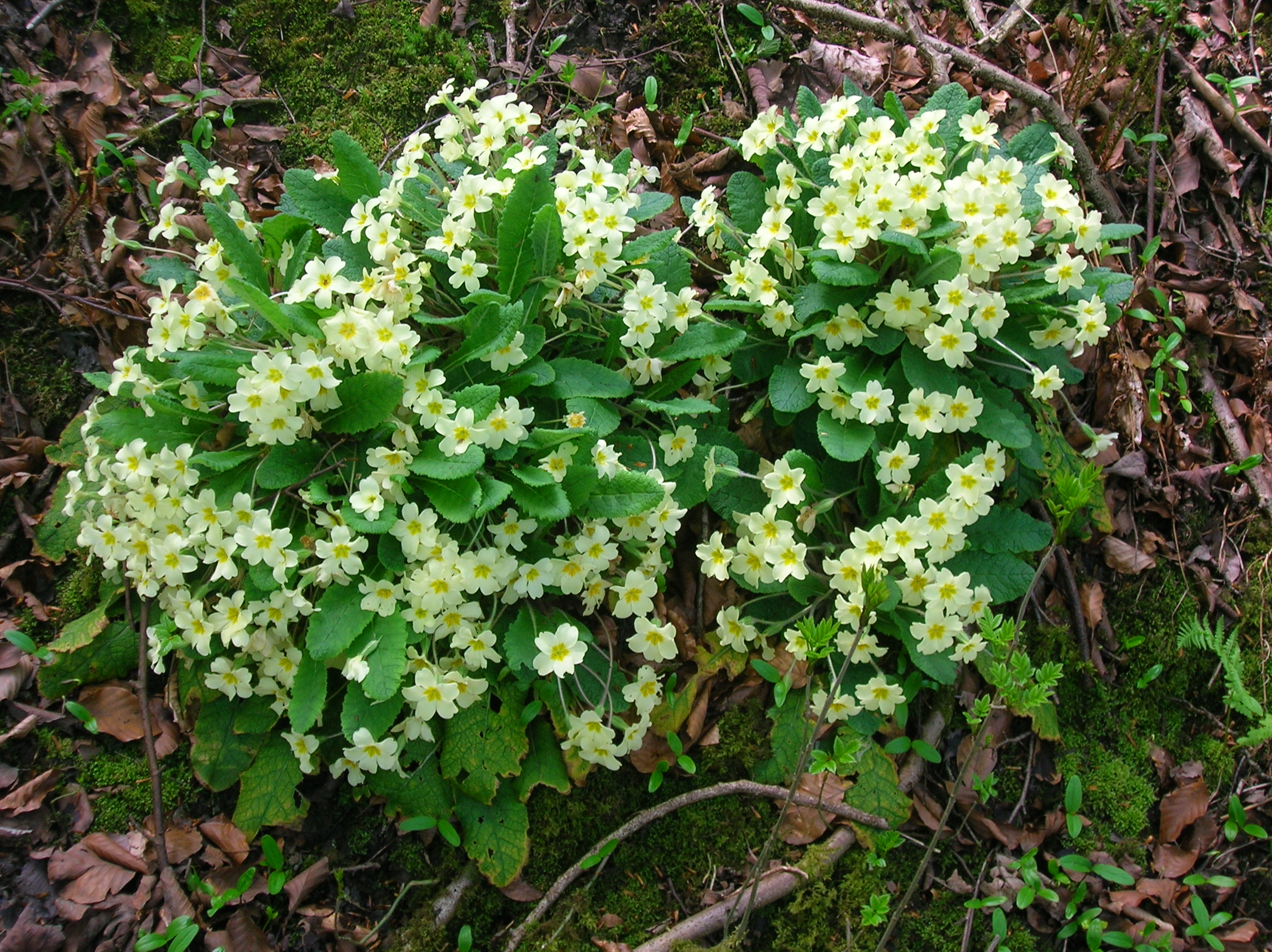
Primroses in the Glen.

=== Dalry Witch ===
On the 8th Nov 1576, midwife Bessie Dunlop, resident of Lynne, in Dalry, was accused of sorcery and witchcraft. She answered her accusers that she received information on prophecies or to the whereabouts of lost goods from a Thomas Reid, a former barony officer in Dalry who died at the Battle of Pinkie some 30 years before.

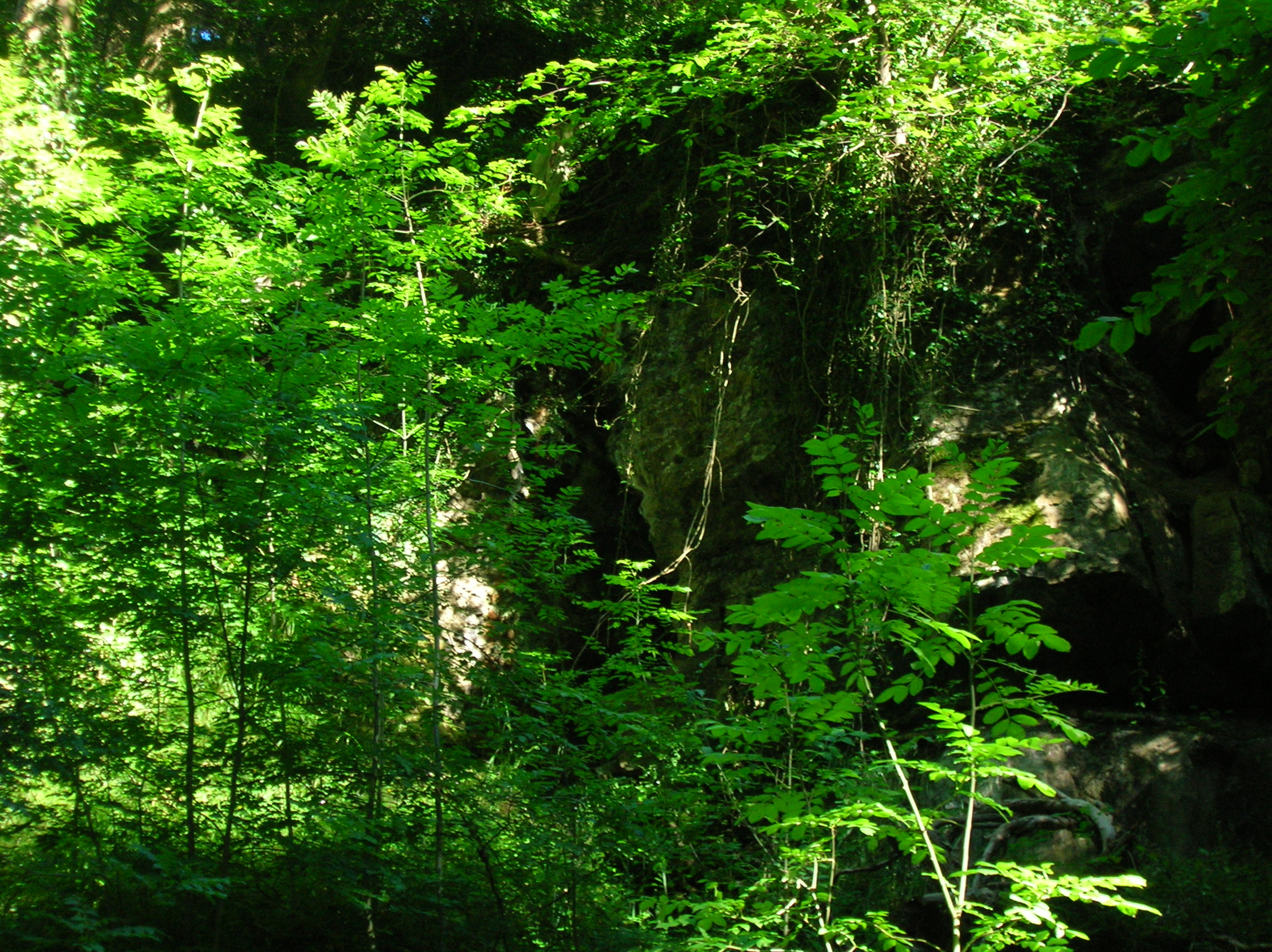
One of the entrances to the Cleeves Cove cave system; the likely Elfhame of the Bessie Dunlop story.

She said she first met him while walking between her own house and the yard of Monkcastle, and after a discussion he then disappeared through a hole in a wall or dyke, apparently too small for a normal person to pass through.

She said she was trained by her "familiar" on how to make and use ointments to heal livestock and people. She was said to have cured and advised various people from poor children to gentry. As a "wise woman" her strange efforts at the time attracted the attention of the law. Her abilities were more akin to today's current psychics, and with an understanding of medicinal herbs, she was identified in a time of witchcraft hysteria. It resulted in a conviction and the tragic outcome was that she was burnt at the stake. at Castle Hill in Edinburgh in 1576. She is also said to have been burnt at Corsehillmuir, just outside Kilwinning.

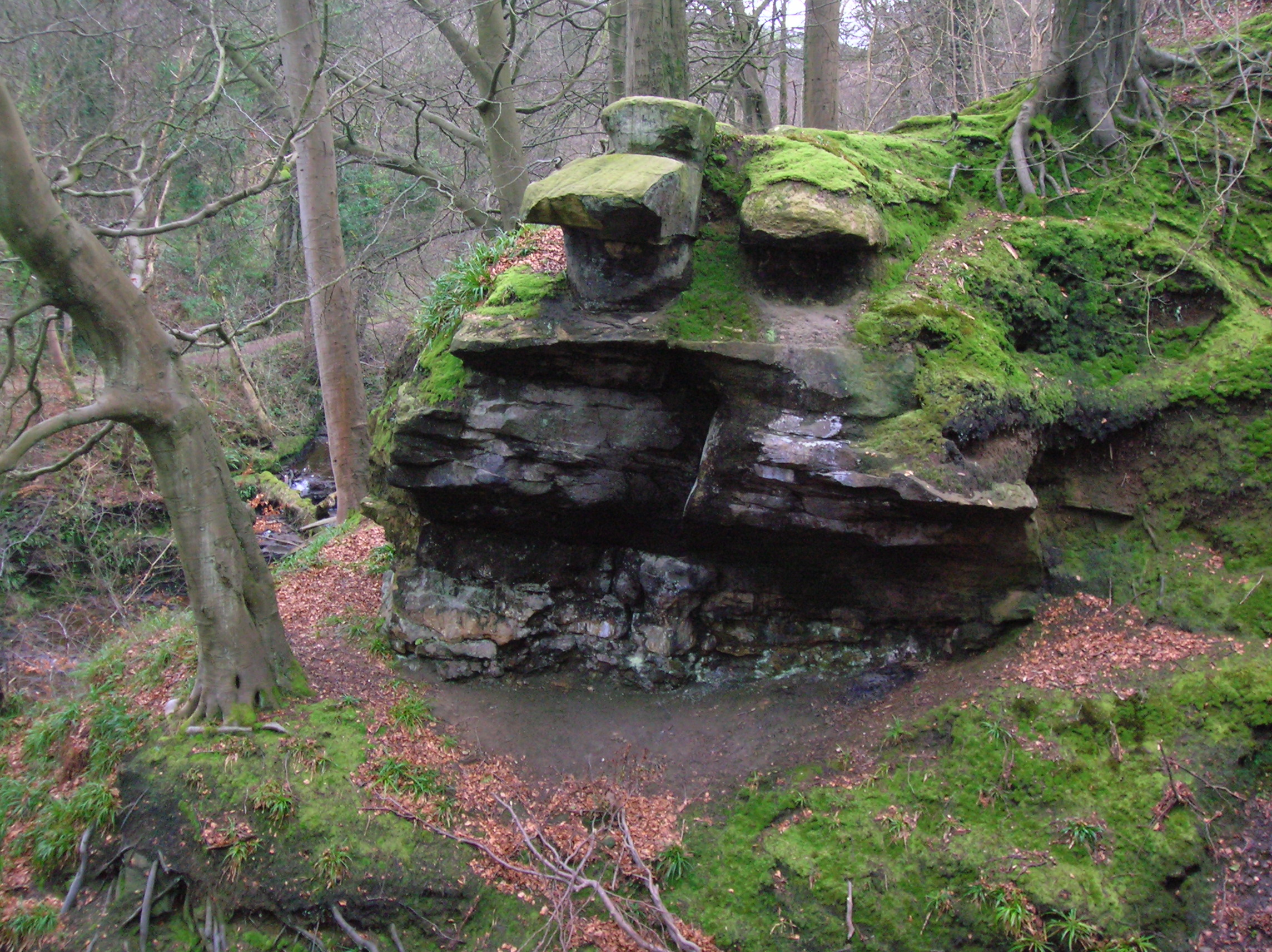
A view in the Lynn Glen.

Alexander Peden (1626–1686) the renowned covenanting minister and remarked as a "profit" (sic) traveled throughout the district. He was said to have preached from Peden's Point (a rocky outcrop) in a natural auditorium at the head of the Lynn glen.

When the main parish church at the Glebe was resited at the "cross" in 1608 it created around it a "kirktoun" establishing the village of Dalry. By 1700 the inhabitants of Dalry still however, numbered barely 100 and contained only about six dwellings. In the mid 18th century, Dalry was still the only town in the parish.

In 1830 there were about 1,000 inhabitants, and the town consisted of five streets, three of these radiated from the "cross" or centre forming a square. Weekly market were held on Thursdays, and there were fairs in January, May and July.

At that time it was a reasonably large irregular shaped rural parish, centred around on the small town of Dalry. The parish included the small settlements / villages of Blair, Burnside, Drakemire, Southfield and the Den.

=== Industrial history ===
Various manufacturing existed in the parish relating to cotton and carpet yarn with silk and harness weaving, in which both men and women were employed. A significant number of women were occupied in sewing and embroidering, mainly for the Glasgow and Paisley manufacturers. The dressing and spinning of flax to some extent was also done in the area.

The opening of numerous limeworks, and a number of coal pits from the 1840s, wholly changed the character of the parish of Dalry. It became an increasingly industrial area peppered with mines to provide the ore and coal to fuel the blast furnaces at the various iron works.

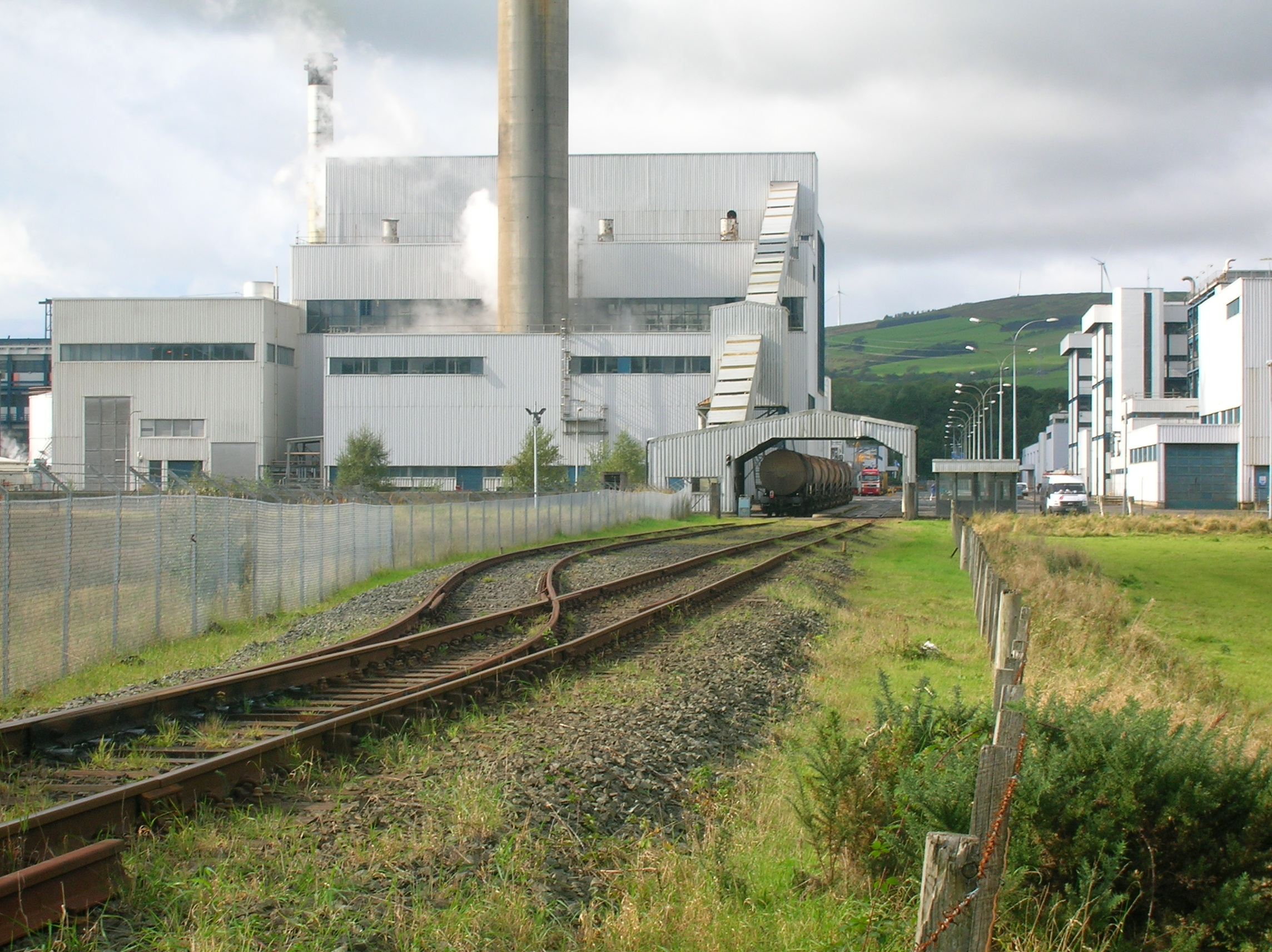
The Dalry DSM-Firmenich factory railway sidings.

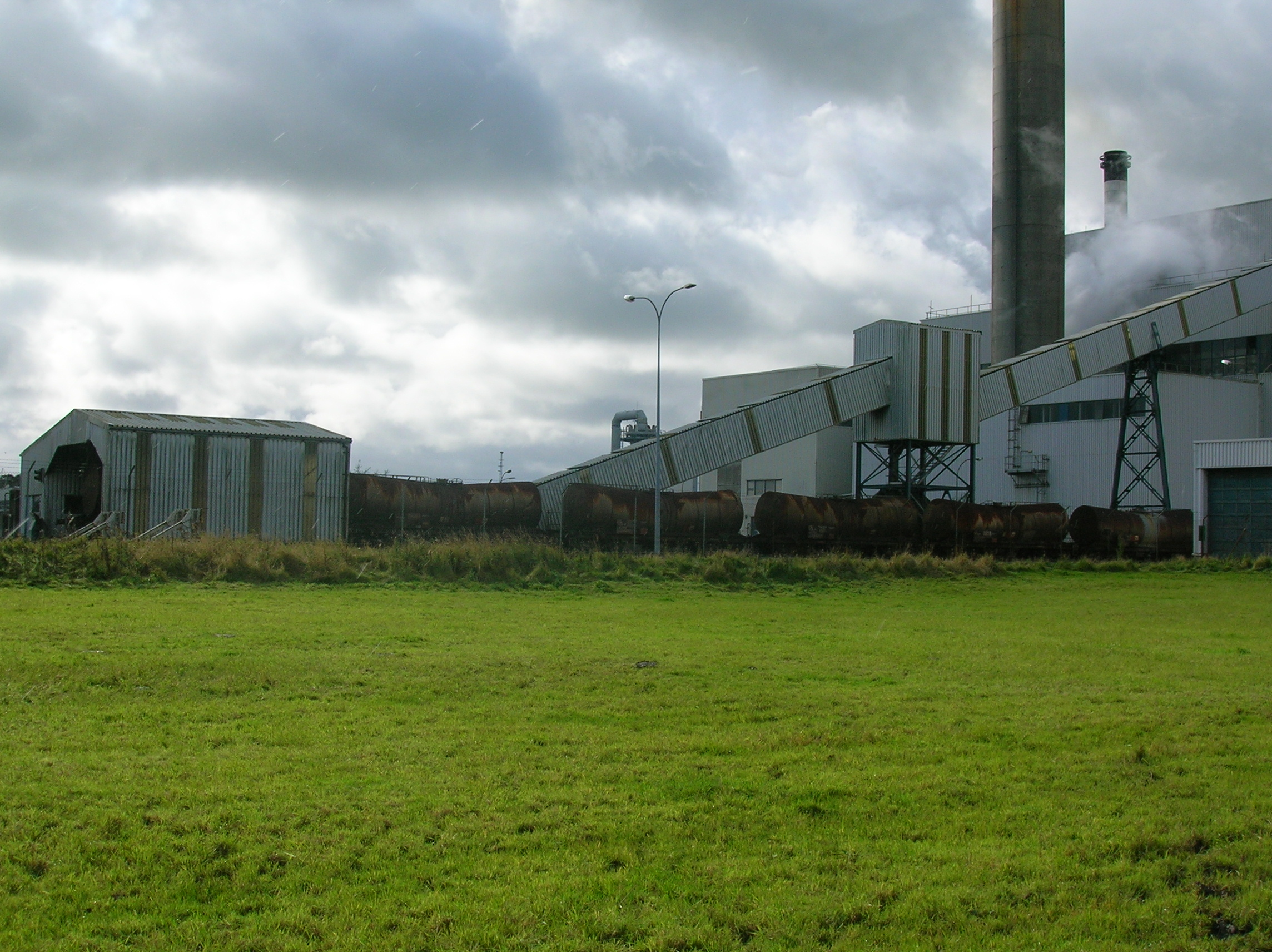
DSM Dalry, Vitamin C and B5 factory.

The town lies on the Ayrshire Coast Line and once was a busier junction with trains from Kilmarnock and the Dalry and North Johnstone Line joining the line here. The railway station at Dalry opened in March 1840 as part of the Glasgow, Paisley, Kilmarnock and Ayr Railway. The station at Dalry Junction opened in April 1843 with the line to Kilmarnock via Crosshouse, subsequently closing in January 1860 with the interchange transferred to Dalry railway station. The line to Kilmarnock remained open with local services ceasing in 1955, with occasional long-distance passenger services remaining. The line closed in 1973, following the electrification of the WCML. The closure of the Dalry and North Johnstone Line to passengers in 1966 and through freight in 1971, and steel freight traffic to Kilbirnie in 1977. Dalry station retained four platforms until rebuilding of the station and associated overbridge as part of the electrification of the Ayrshire Coast line during the early 1980s.

Maps and information of the time indicate a rail line from Blair iron works to the main line. This development of large iron works and the mining of ore and coal further increased the housing stock and population in and around the area. The suburb of Blair for example developed around one such ironworks. Numerous bings next to these excavations in the area are still evident to this day.

Morning and evening daily stage coaches passed through Dalry on the routes between Glasgow and various coastal destinations.

The "Fair Trader" coach stopped at the Crown Inn and the "Herald" coach at the King's Arms, neither ran on Sundays. There were also several public houses, which had accommodation for travellers.

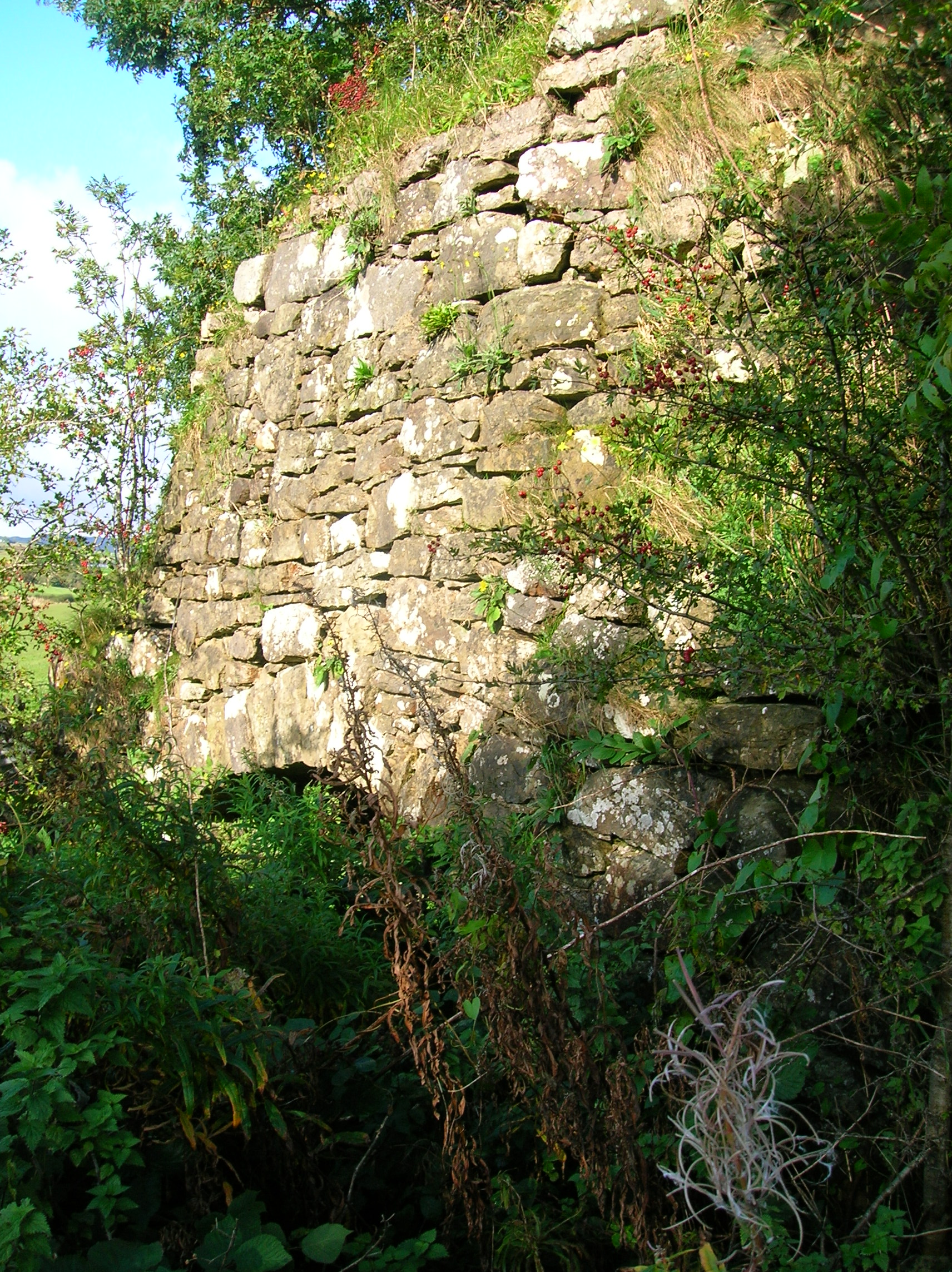
An old Lime kiln at Flashwood.

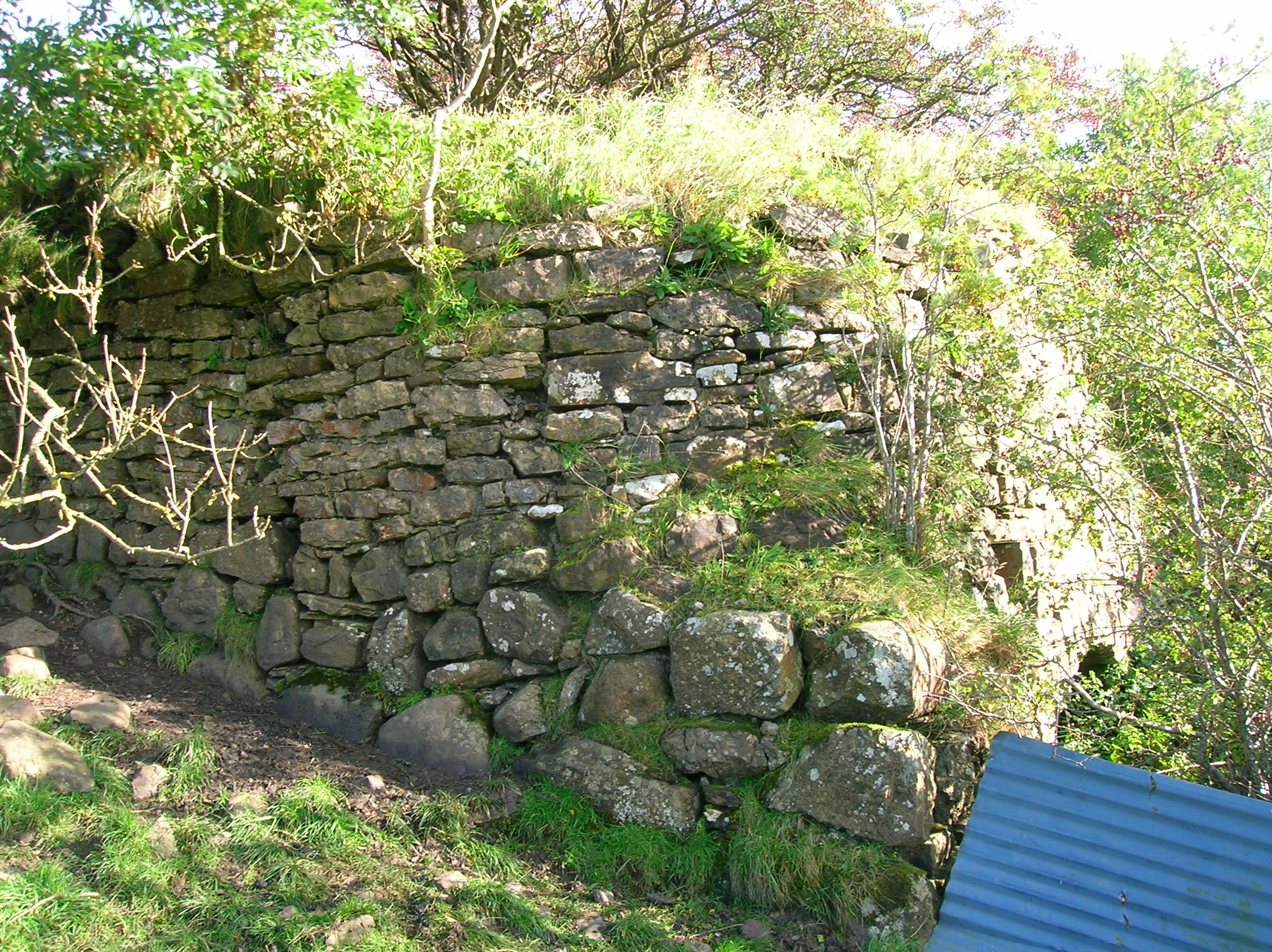
The Flashwood Lime Kiln.

The public libraries at the time were the "Dalry Library", the "Dalry Church Library" and the "United Secession Library". At this time the town was lit by gas, by a Company formed in 1834.

The River Garnock helps to irrigate the valley and, joined by the tributaries Rye Water and Caaf Water, was a driving force behind the establishment of the town. These waters were utilised by the various mills in the 19th century

The industries of limestone, coal and ironstone assisted Dalry to develop into a thriving mining community.

The iron was smelted in the furnaces of the four great iron companies - the Ayrshire, the Glengarnock, the Eglinton and the Blair. In 1845 a visitor was "astonished at the change and at the numerous tasks of the busy labourers. The blaze of furnaces, the smoke of coal-pits, the whiter volume emitted by limekilns, and the building of houses, are at intervals seen all over the district."

In the 1870s it is stated that Blair Iron Works and others in the area were part of the group owned by William Baird & Co. who then was the largest pig iron producer in the world.

This once industrial town, like many such towns in this area of Scotland has seen a sharp decline of traditional industry, which has hit the town hard. In addition to coal mining, iron stone mining and textile manufacturing the town also had clay mines to be used in the areas various brickworks. To produce common red brick these brickworks were also well supplied with clay extracted from coal mine waste, available from the numerous "bings" throughout the valley, whereas the mined clay was required for higher quality fire brick.

On the edge of the town lies a large chemical plant once operated by Roche, but now run by dsm-firmenich, producing vitamins C and B5.

==== The Douglas brickworks and Monkcastle fireclay mine ====
The Douglas Firebrick Company Ltd had its works located where the Wilson Car Auction company now trades (2008). The works closed in September 1945. The railway was double track and narrow gauge, working through a 'cable and pulleys' system on light steel rails. The gravity railroad allowed the weight of the loaded cars, which were disconnected for unloading, to return the empty ones back up to the mine. The surface of the inclined plane railroad was paved with firebricks, for employees to walk up the tracks to get to the main Dalry to Kilwinning road where they could catch a bus. The small brick structure gave them shelter from the weather, while they waited. The building is open on the southerly side, and originally had windows on the others (now bricked in), so that they could watch for the next bus coming. The current access road and bridge are more recent additions, as formerly vehicular access to the works was by a road which connected to the area near the railway station, almost a mile (1.5 km) to the north. The railway went through a short cutting and passed under the main road in a short tunnel. A truck has been preserved at the nearby Dalgarven Mill Museum of Scottish Country Life and Costume.

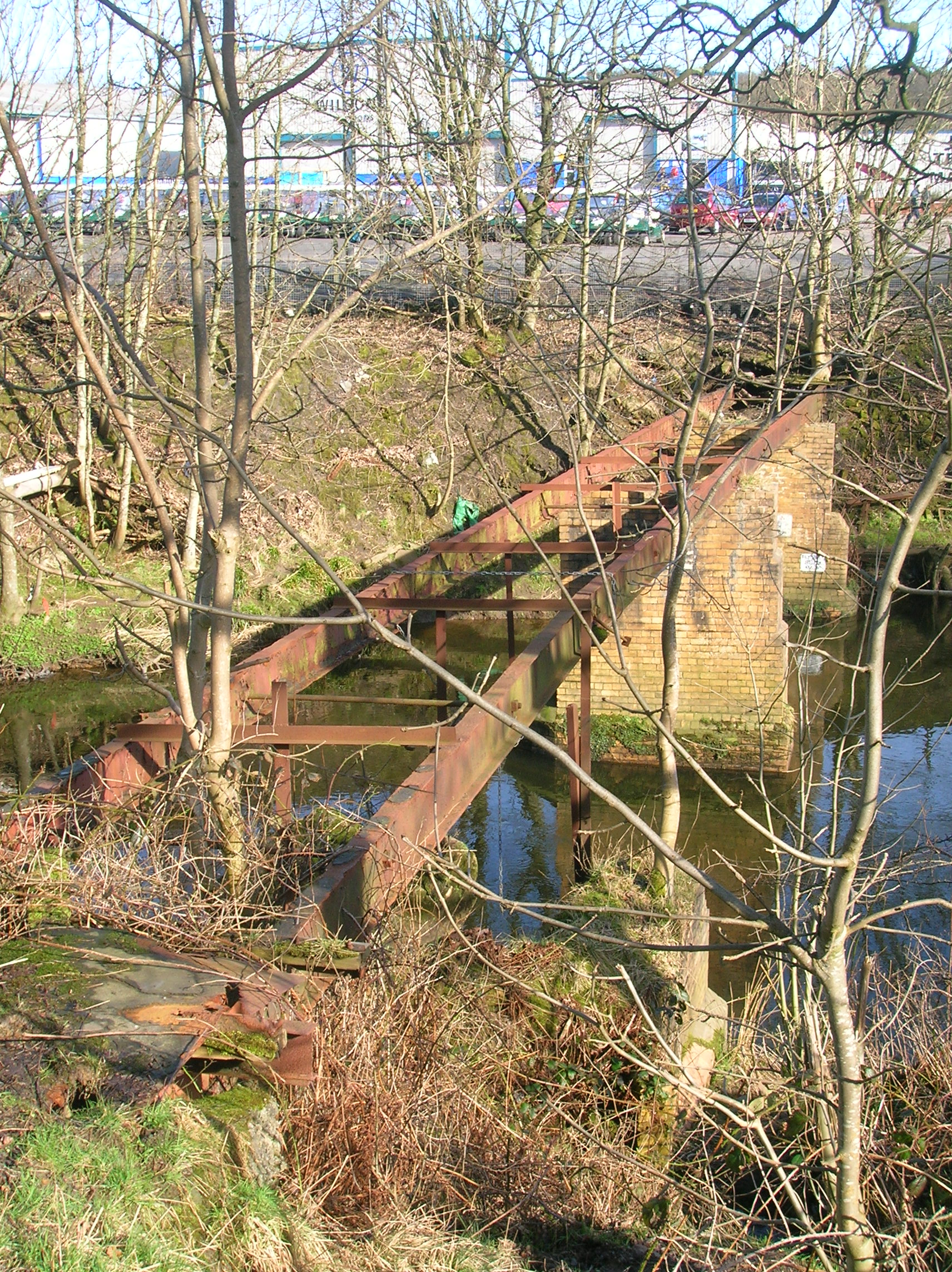
The railway bridge over the River Garnock to the site of the old Douglas Firebrick works.

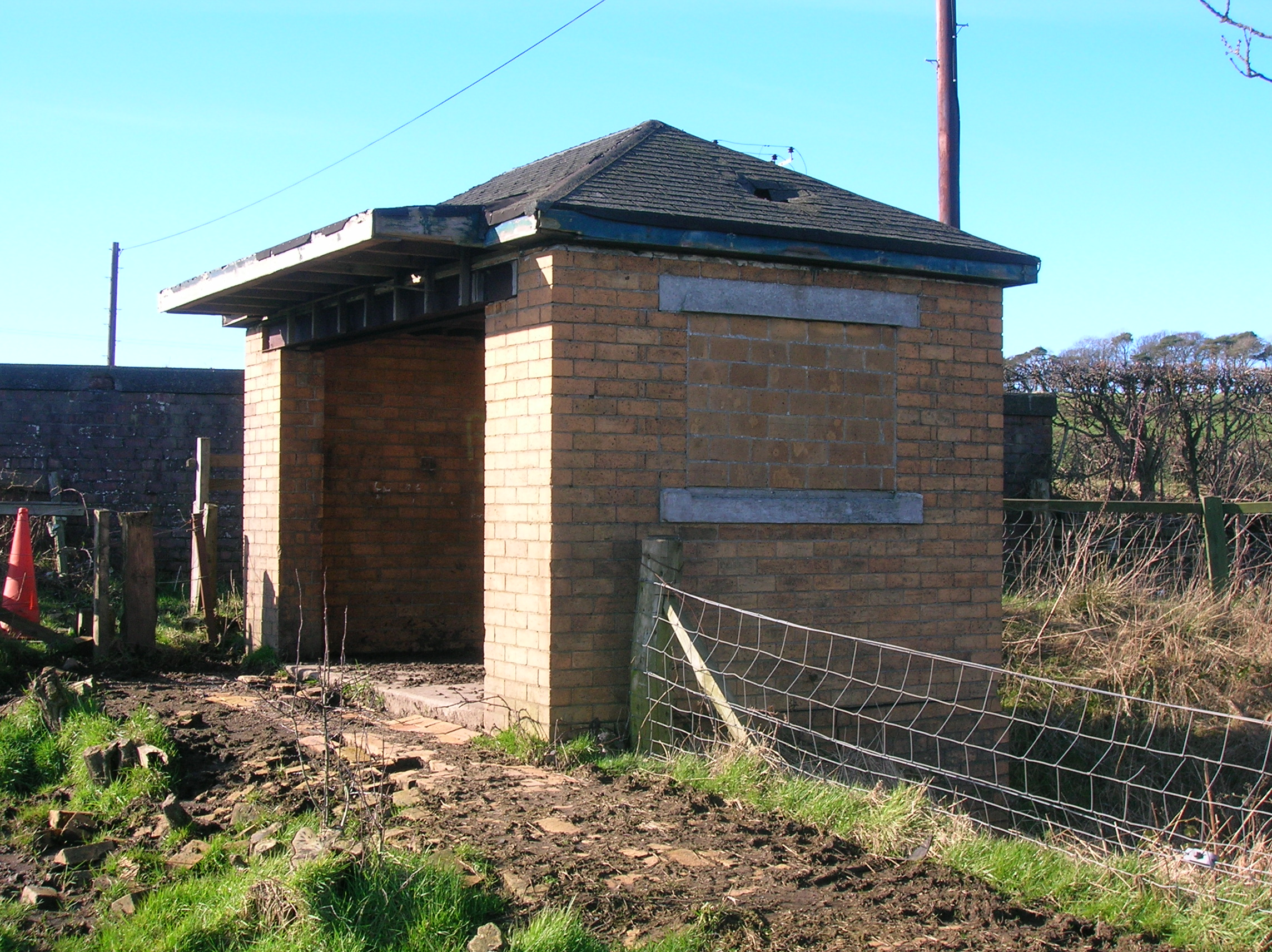
The shelter near the tunnel under the Dalry to Kilwinning road.

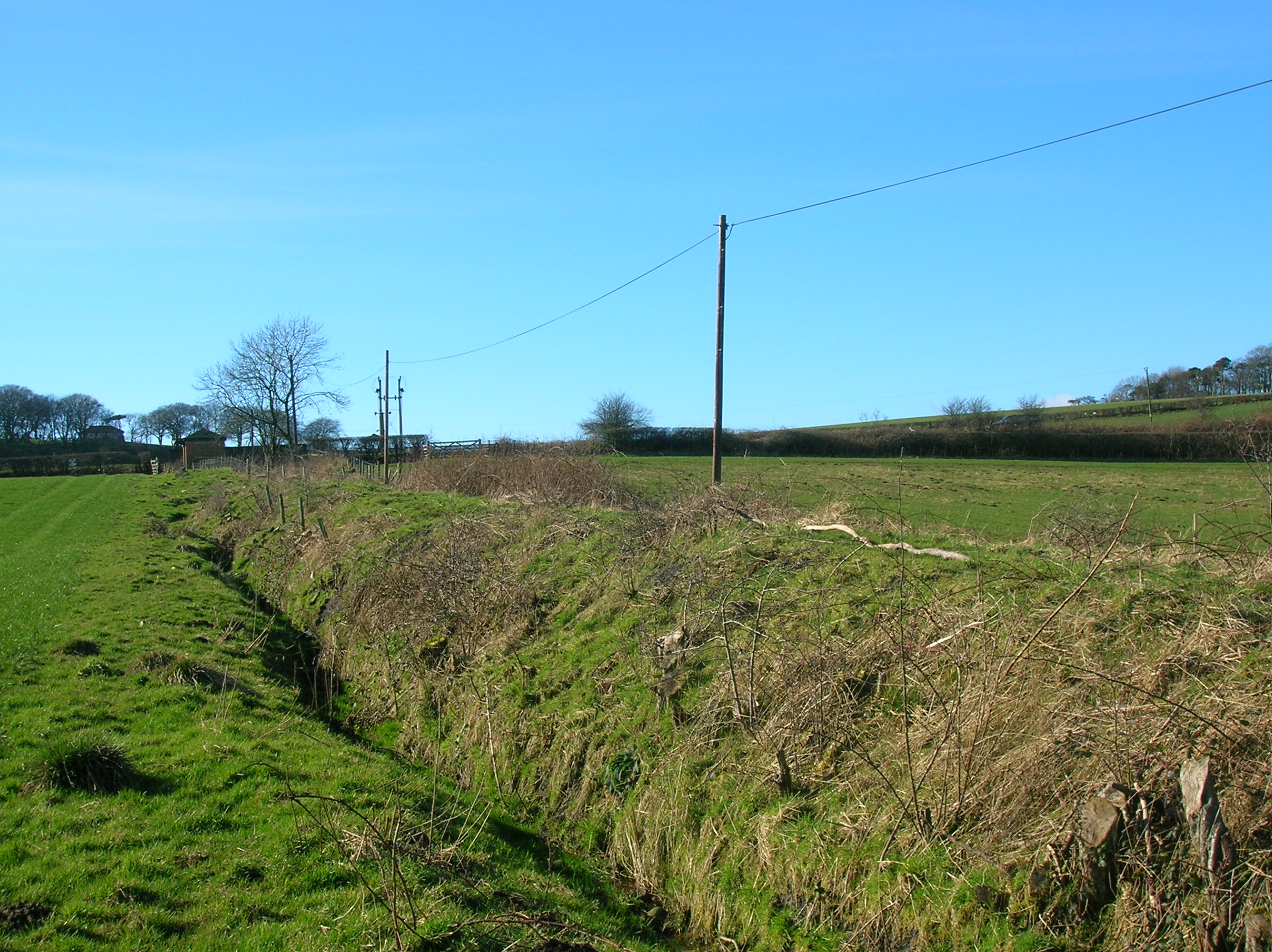
A view of the inclined plane railway's embankment.

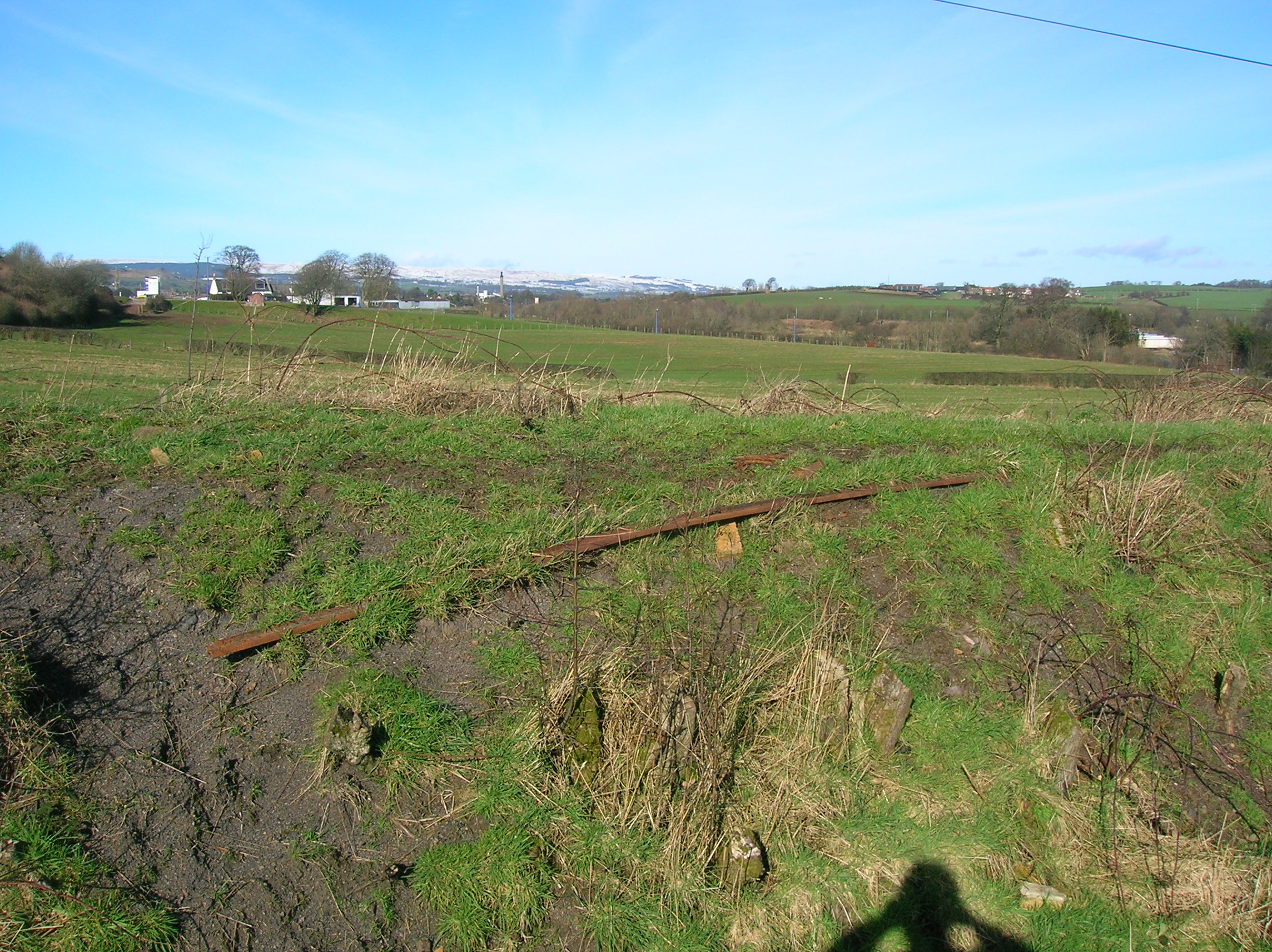
A rail from the old inclined plane railway on the abandoned embankment.

== The Lovers' Walk ==
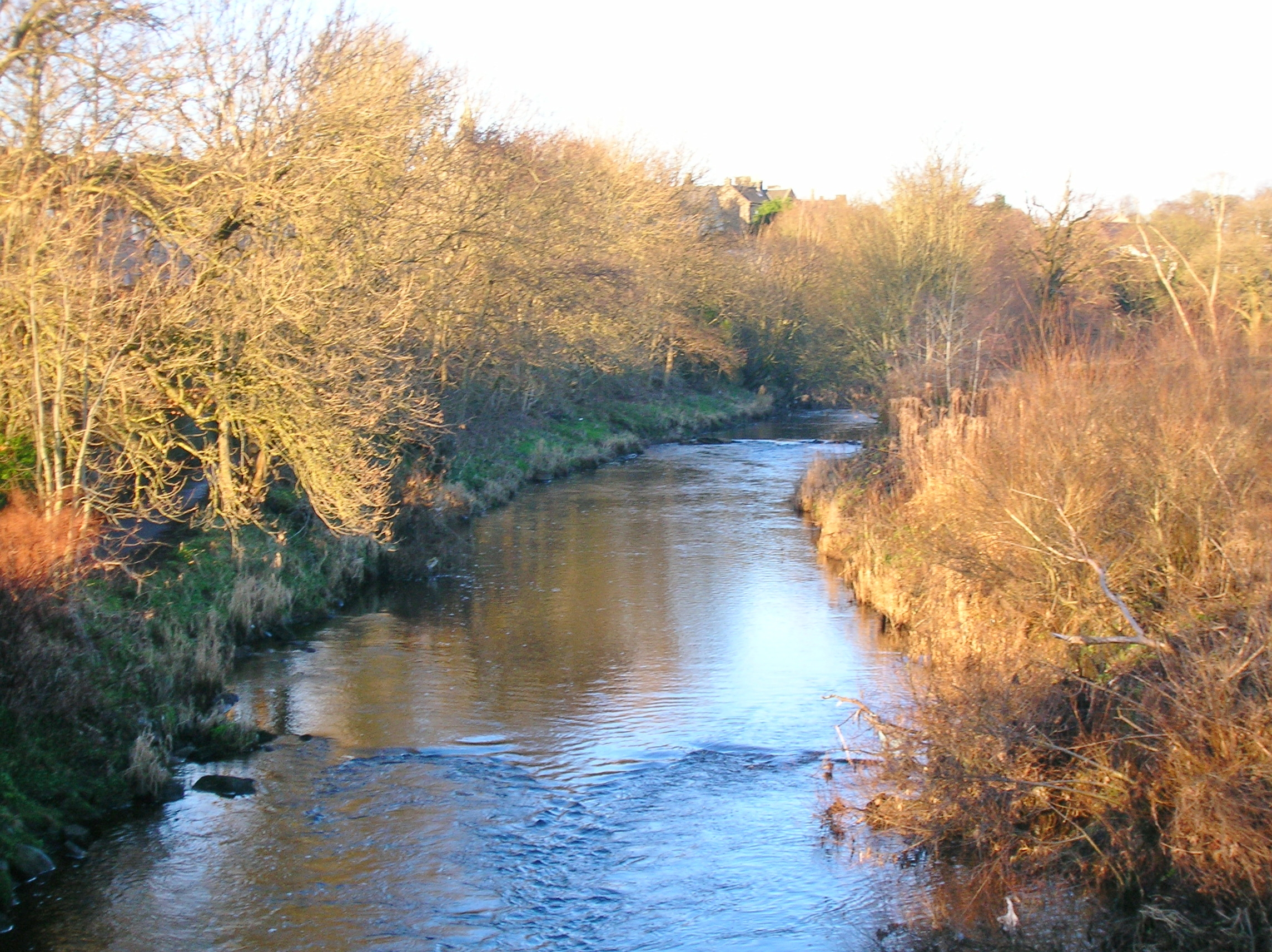
The Garnock from the Lovers' Bridge with the Lovers' Walk on the left.

The Lovers' Lane and Lovers' Bridge in Dalry are recorded on old postcards and maps of the 19th century, however it seems to have evolved over the years to include paths that didn't then exist. The 1856 maps shows that no bridge existed across the River Garnock near the confluence of the Garnock and the Putyan Burn, but a well was located nearby on the town side of the river and a path to this well ran up to Garnock Street and Aitken Street. A formal footpath and a footbridge had been built by 1896 and various postcards show an ever more impressive path running beside the river that is named as the Lovers' Walk. The original bridge was made of steel, now replaced by a wooden construction. A footpath also ran down from Bridgend Lane to the new footbridge and this seems to have been or become part of the Lovers' Walk of Victorian and Edwardian times.

Today the Lovers' Walk seems to have been stretched even more to include the walk down beside the river, under the railway and back up to the Blair Road via Blairland Farm. You can still get rural views from the Lovers' Bridge across the holm to the old Dalry Manse and sightings of kingfishers are reported from time to time, accompanied by that of mallards. The original Lovers' Walk has lost much of its romance, but the name lives on locally.

== The Blair School ==
A rural school that lay near the Blair Estate is recorded in a photograph and is shown on old Ordnance Survey maps. In 1856 the school is marked as 'Blairmains' located on the junction onto the lane to Templelandmuir with two buildings, one possibly the teacher's residence and the school room in what may have been a playground. A well is nearby, reached by a path running from the two buildings and a small building was located a few metres away, just the other side of the Blair Estate boundary wall.

In 1895 the school appears to have been rebuilt with two quite different buildings present that seem to be a school room and a toilet/washroom block. Two wells are present and a path runs across the site on the other side of the buildings. The nearby building in the Blair Estate is no longer marked. In 1909 only a single well is shown and the surrounding grounds are marked as overgrown.

A nearby site of interest is that of a Pre-Reformation chapel that was located nearby on the Blair Estate side of the boundary wall. No remains survive above ground.

== Transportation ==
Dalry is served by Dalry railway station on the Ayrshire Coast Line. The town is bypassed by the A737, the bypass opening in May 2019 at a cost of £31.2 million.

== Noted natives and residents ==
- Daniel Kerr (politician), became a US Congressman from Grundy Center, Iowa in 1886.
- William Gibson Sloan, became a Missionary to the Northern Isles and the Faroe Islands
- George Houston RSA, Scottish landscape artist, (1869–1947) lived in a house overlooking Lynn Glen in Dalry.
- Chris Geddes, a member of Scottish indie band Belle and Sebastian
- Ben Gannon-Doak, football player with Bournemouth and Scotland
- Lewis Gilbert, racing driver

== Dalry natural history gallery ==
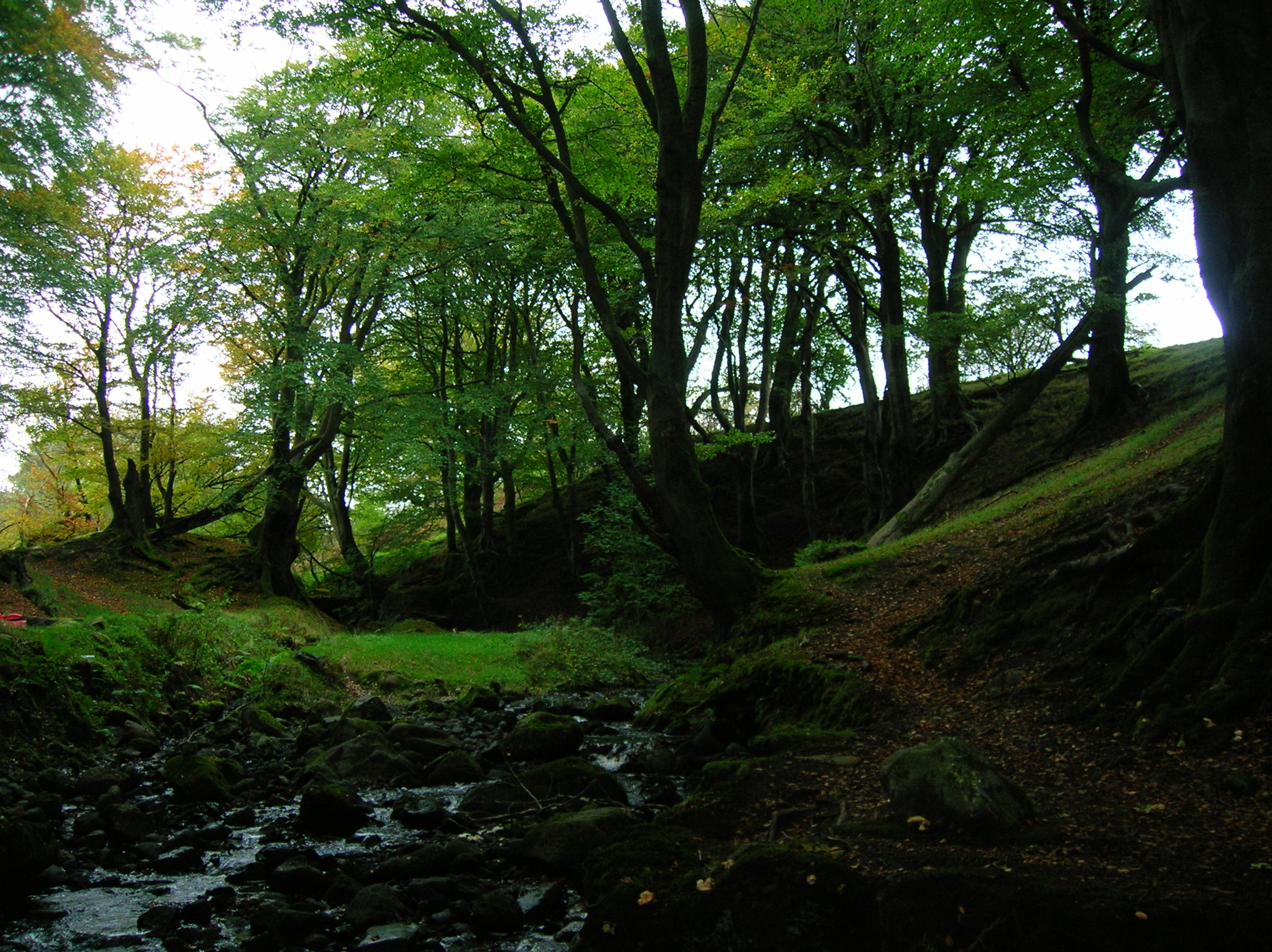
Giffordland Glen beechwood off the Ardrossan and West Kilbride road.

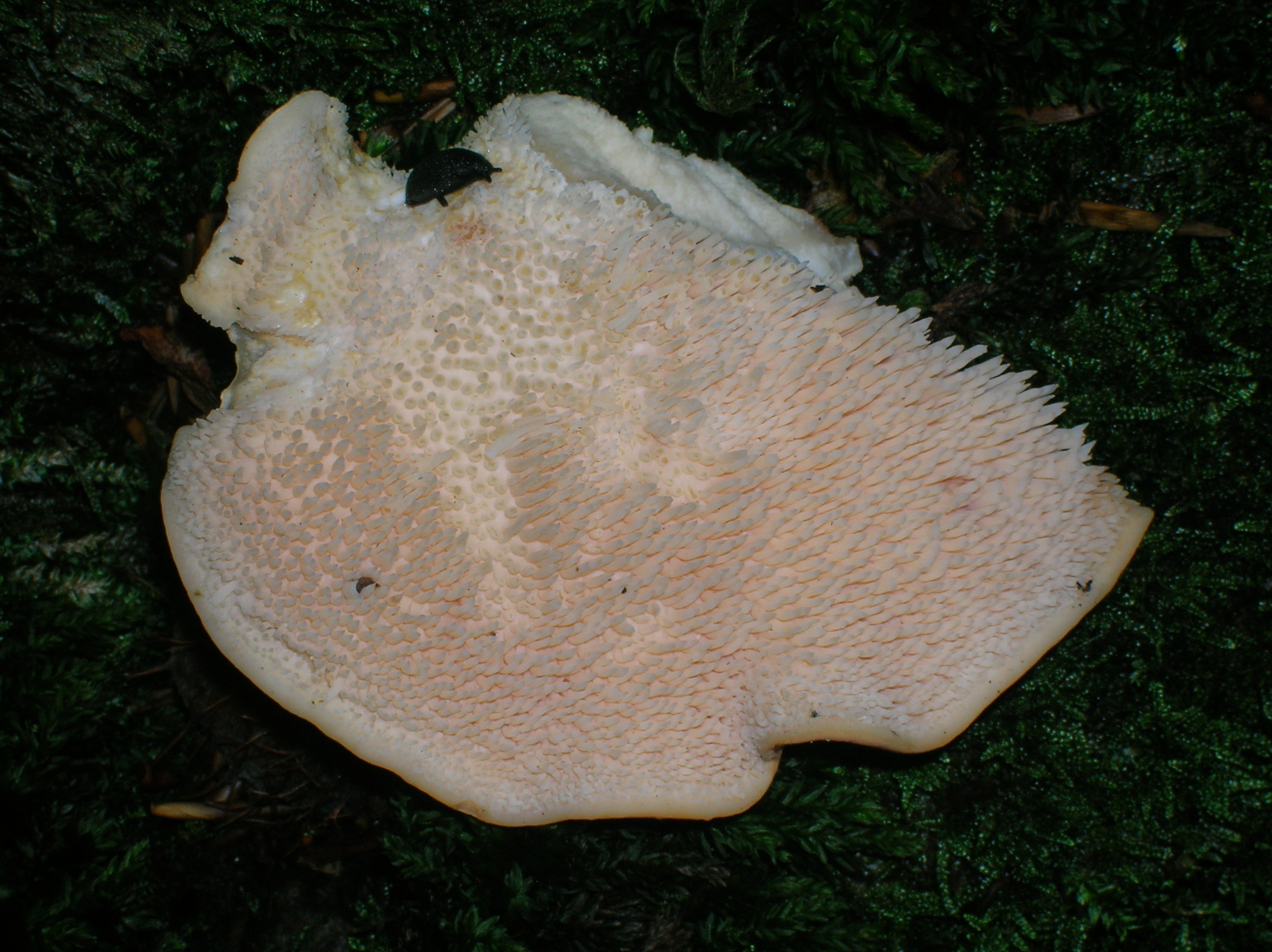
The Hedgehog fungus (Hydnum repandum) at Giffordland.

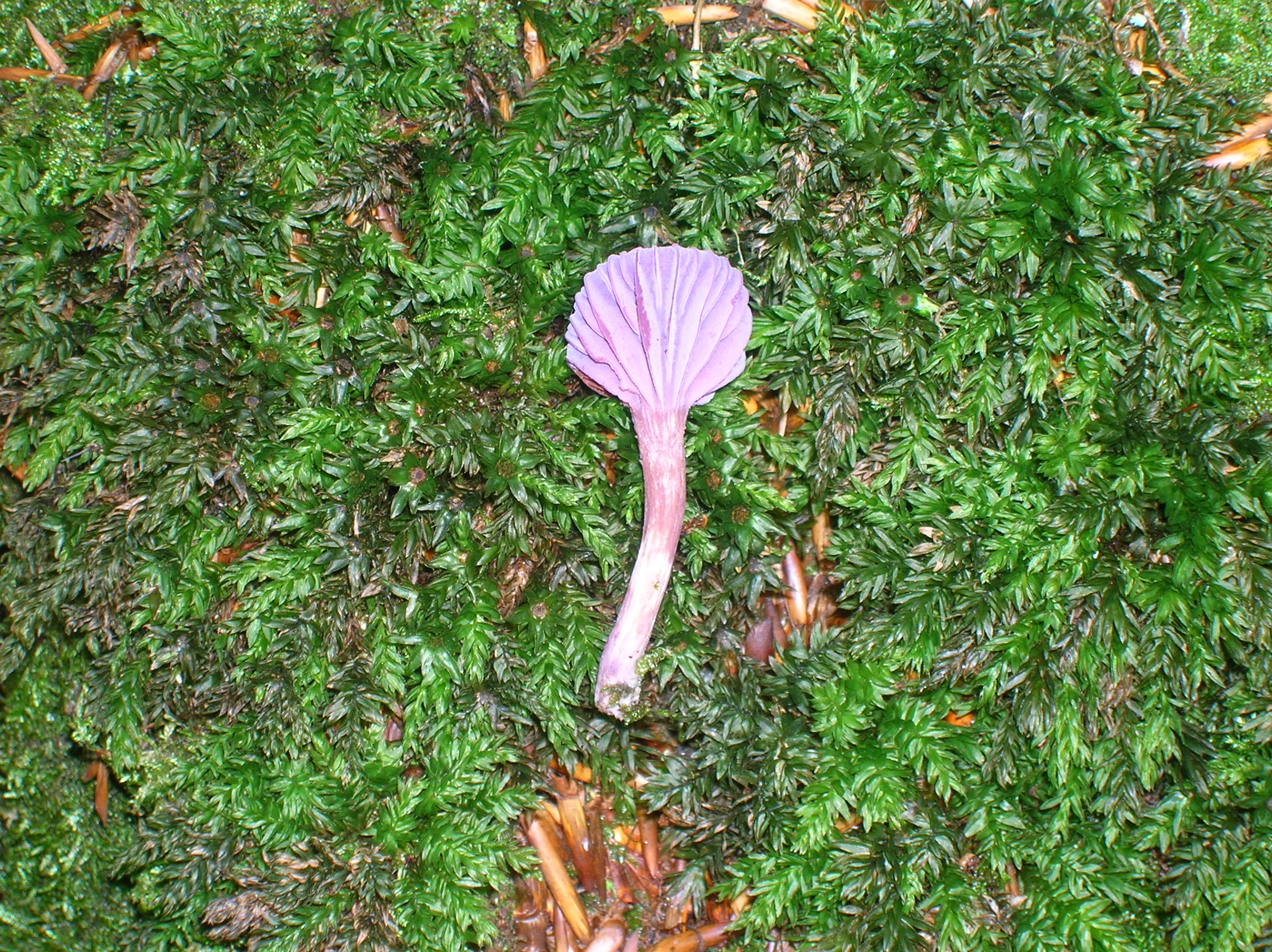
The Amethyst Deceiver (Laccaria) at Giffordland.

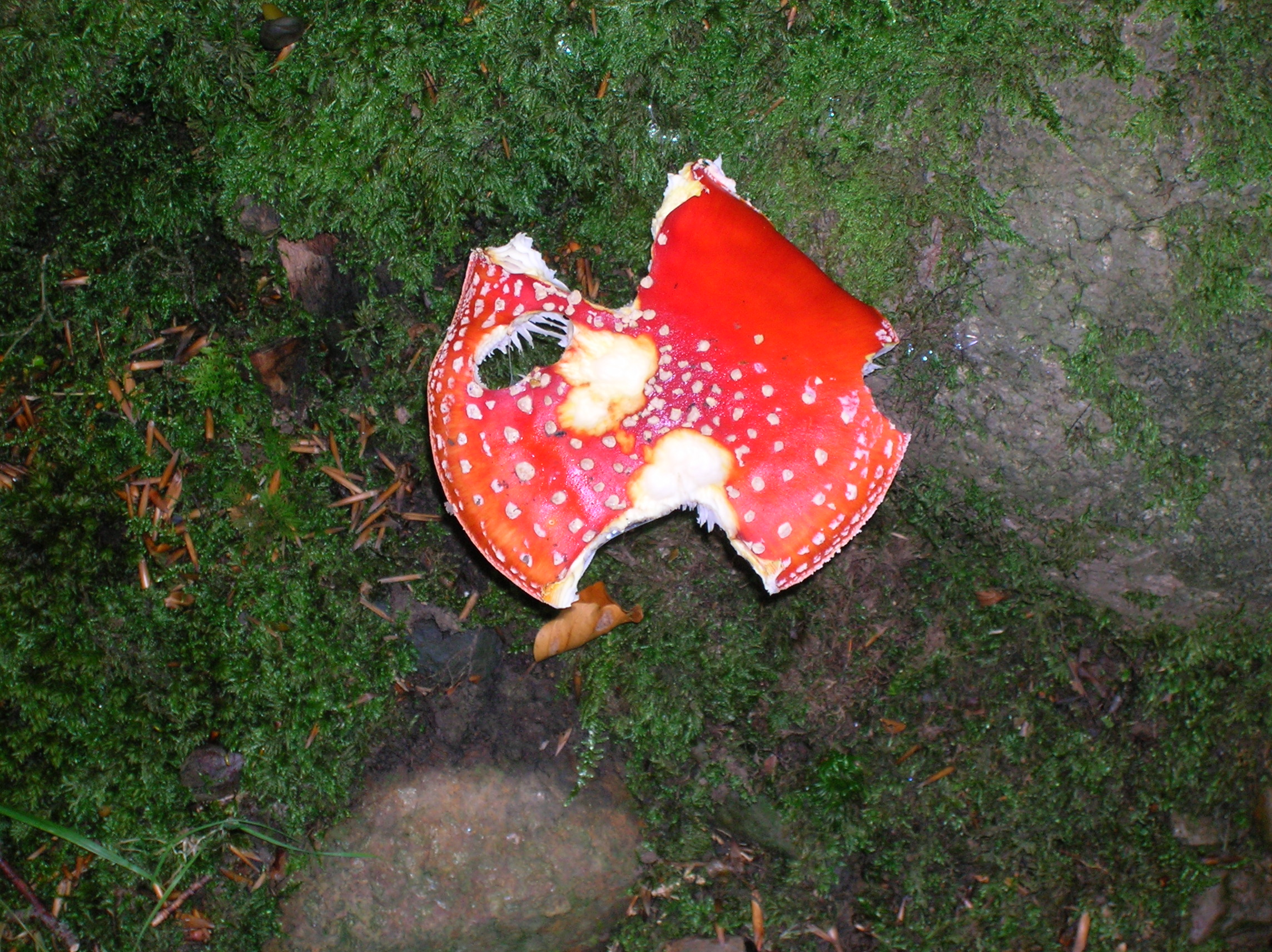
The Fly Agaric (Amanita muscaria) at Giffordland, damaged by slugs.

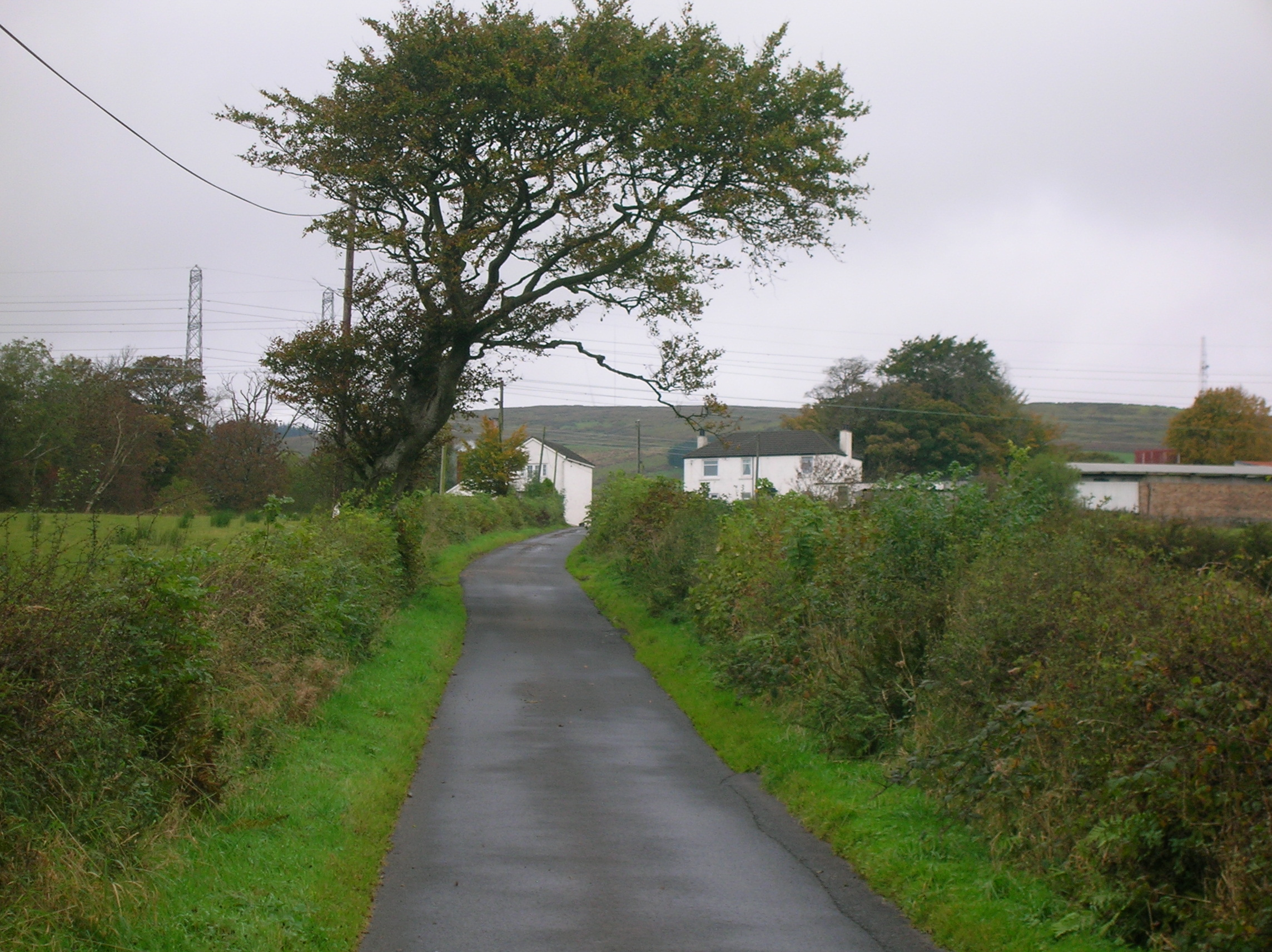
Well established hedgerows at Cubeside Farm and the villa on the lower slopes of Baidland Hill.

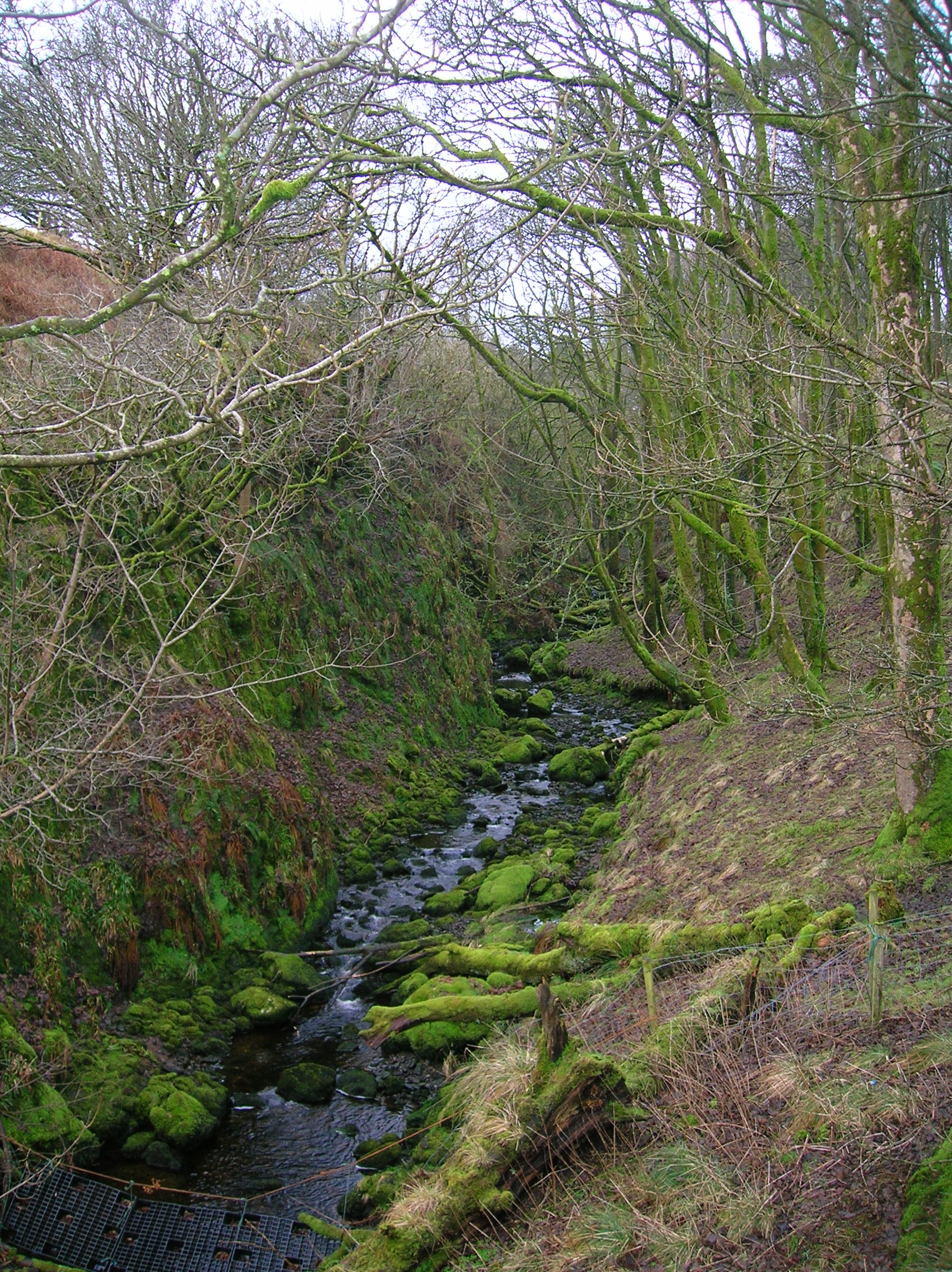
Ferns, mosses and liverworts in Raven's Craig Glen on the South Burn.

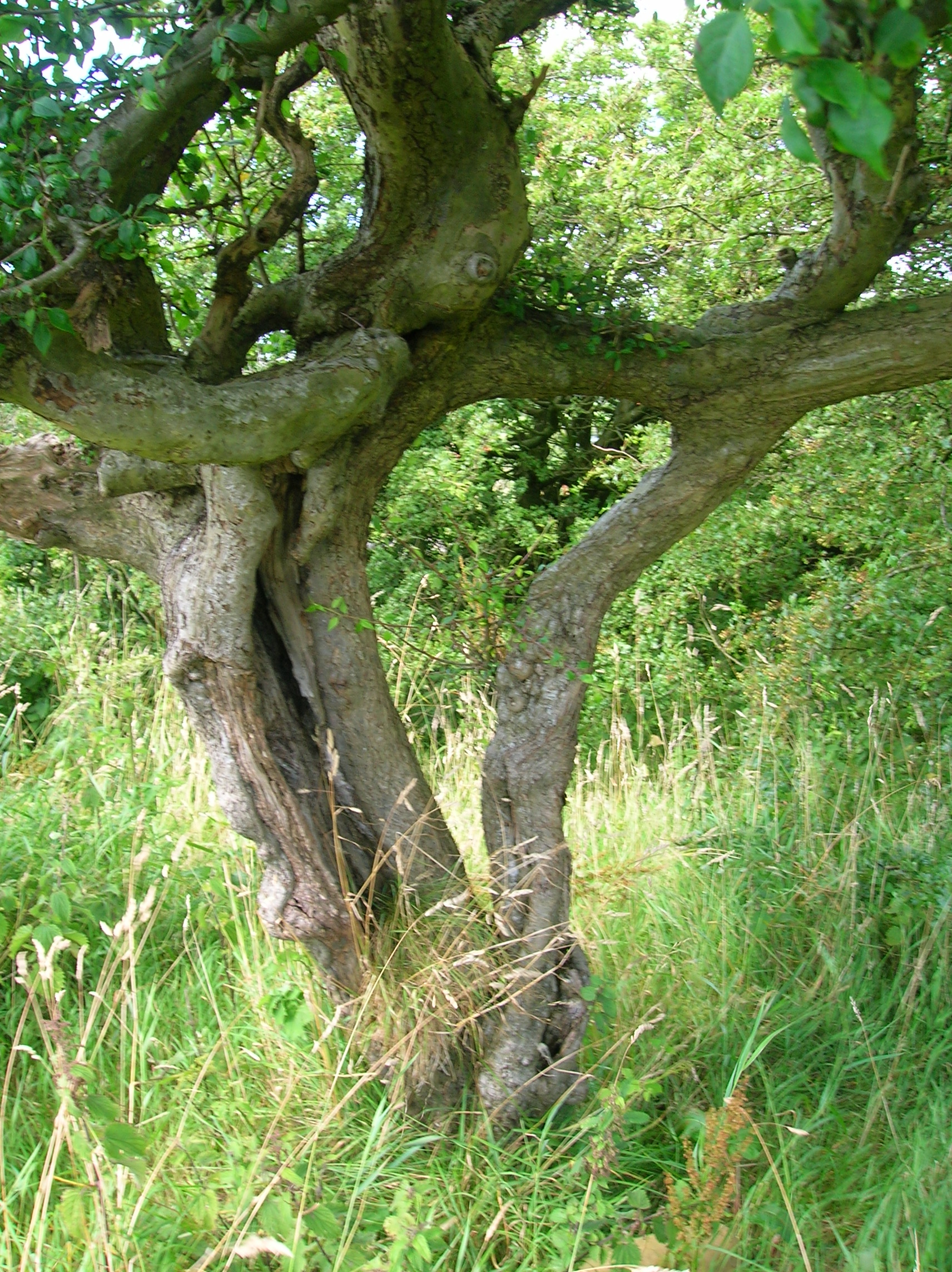
Fused blackthorns at Lynncraigs; known as a Husband and Wife tree.

== Church ==
St Palladius's Church is one of three churches in the parish of the Roman Catholic Diocese of Galloway; the other two are Our Lady's (Beith) and St Brigid's Church, Kilbirnie.

== See also ==
- Cleeves Cove cave
- Museum of Ayrshire Country Life and Costume Dalgarven Mill
- Giffordland, Ayrshire
- Swindridgemuir House and estate
- The Barony of Kersland
- Ravenscraig and Jameston Railway
- Bessie Dunlop of Lynn

== Sources and Bibliography ==
- The Genealogy of the Family of Lind, and the Montgomeries of Smithton, Sir Robert Douglas, Baronet, Windsor (1795)
- Historical Tales and Legends of Ayrshire, William Robertson, London and Glasgow (1889)
- Scottish Record Society Publications, Scottish Record Society, Edinburgh (late 19th-early 20th centuries)
- Dalry Remembered, Dalry Local History Society. 1885. ISBN 0-9510674-0-0.
