= Beith =

Town in North Ayrshire, Scotland

Coordinates: 55.7533°N 4.6319°W

Beith: Scottish Gaelic: Beithe
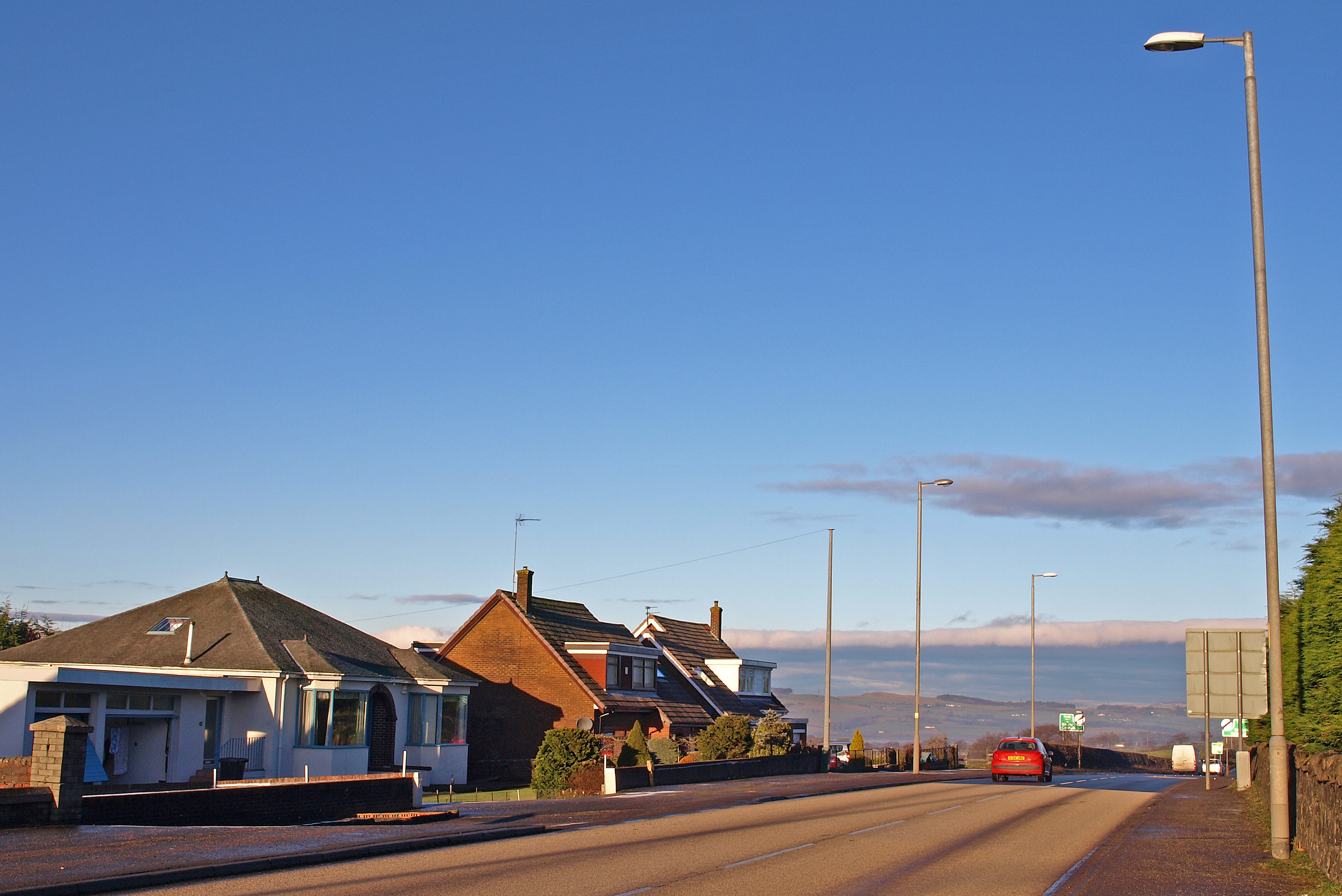
- A737 road, Beith

- Location within North Ayrshire
- Population: 5,940 (2020)
- OS grid reference: NS349542
  - Edinburgh: 67 miles (108 km)
- Council area: North Ayrshire
- Lieutenancy area: Ayrshire and Arran
- Country: Scotland
- Sovereign state: United Kingdom
- Post town: BEITH
- Postcode district: KA15
- Dialling code: 01505
- Police: Scotland
- Fire: Scottish
- Ambulance: Scottish
- UK Parliament: North Ayrshire and Arran
- Scottish Parliament: Cunninghame North

Beith (locally /biːð/) is a town in the Garnock Valley, North Ayrshire, Scotland approximately 20 miles (30 kilometres) south-west of Glasgow. The town is situated on the crest of a hill and was known originally as the "Hill o' Beith" (hill of the birches) after its Court Hill.

== History ==
=== Name ===
Beith's name is thought to emanate from Ogham, which is sometimes referred to as the "Celtic Tree Alphabet", ascribing names of trees to individual letters. Beithe in Old Irish means Birch-tree (cognate to Latin betula). There is reason to believe that the whole of the district was covered with woods. The town of Beith itself was once known as 'Hill of Beith' as this was the name of the feudal barony and was itself derived from the Court Hill near Hill of Beith Castle.

Alternatively, Beith may be derived from Cumbric *baɣeδ, 'boar' (Welsh baedd). The local pronunciation of the name would favour this theory.

The Wood of Beit, now the 'Moor of Beith', has been identified as an Arthurian site where according to Taliessin in a poem under the name of 'Canowan' it was the site of a battle in the wood of Beit at the close of the day.

=== Saint Inan ===
Beith is said to have been the occasional residence of Saint Inan, a confessor of some celebrity, whose principal place of abode was Irvine. He flourished about 839. Although he is said to have been a hermit, according to tradition Saint Inan often visited Beith, frequenting Cuff Hill with its Rocking Stone and various other prehistoric monuments. A cleft in the west-front of Lochlands Hill is still known as "St. Inan's Chair" and said to have been used by the saint as a pulpit. An unsuccessful search for the saint's writings which were said to be preserved in the library of Bonci, Archbishop of Pisa, was made by Colonel Mure of Caldwell in the 19th century.

Saint Inan is said to have preached to the assembled people from the chair on the hill. There was not a great population in the area at that time and the people were located not in Beith, but up on the top of the Bigholm near to the old Beith water dams. The first settlements were in the heavily wooded areas around the dams where people were safe from attack and could get food from the land, and fish in the lochs. The Saints of old went where the people were, and they also tended to go where there had been worship of heathen gods. It has been suggested that High Bogside Farm, which used to be called Bellsgrove, was really "Baalsgrove", which fits in with the story of Saint Inan going to where the pagan gods were.

There is an annual civic fete held in the town bearing Saint Inan's name.

=== Alexander Montgomerie ===
The sixteenth century poet Alexander Montgomerie was probably born in Hazelhead (now Hessilhead) Castle, which is on the outskirts of Beith, beyond Gateside. Montgomerie is regarded as one of the finest of Middle Scots poets, and perhaps the greatest Scottish exponent of the sonnet form.

=== Smugglers ===
Beith has a historical connection to smuggling and built a reputation during the 18th century as being a town which harboured those whose intentions were not always lawful. In 1733 forty or fifty Beith smugglers sacked the Irvine Customs House, escaping with a rich booty of confiscated contraband goods and by 1789 a company of 76 soldiers were quartered in the town dealing with the continuing illicit trade in tea, tobacco, and spirits. This caused great inconvenience to the law-abiding citizens on whom the soldiers were billeted. The town was policed in this fashion for some time thereafter. Hence, the Main Street's popular public house is still called the Smugglers Tavern, recalling the days when Beith's location between the coast and Paisley and Glasgow, made it a convenient stopping off point for those involved in nefarious activities.

A possible relic of the smuggling days of Beith is the ley tunnel that is said to run from Eglinton Street to Kilbirnie Loch.

=== Morrishill and James Montgomery ===
Now a small housing estate, the house and land of Morrishill stood a short distance south of Beith. It commanded an excellent view and was well sheltered with trees. Owned by Robert Shedden, who purchased the land in 1748, it is notoriously linked to the case of James Montgomery.

James Montgomery, an enslaved African, was brought from Virginia to Beith by Shedden. He wanted Montgomery, then called "Shanker", apprenticed to a joiner so that he would learn a skill and could then be sold for a large profit back in Virginia. James was trained in carpentry by Robert Morrice, husband of Shedden's sister Elizabeth Montgomery. When Shanker was baptised in Beith Parish Church (by the Rev. John Witherspoon) with the name James Montgomery in April 1756, Shedden objected. Montgomery was dragged nearly 30 miles (50 kilometres) to Port Glasgow behind horses to be taken back to Virginia but escaped to Edinburgh before the ship sailed. Montgomery sought justice but before a decision could be made by judges he died in Tolbooth Gaol.

=== Rev. John Witherspoon ===
A signatory of the American Declaration of Independence, the Rev. John Witherspoon, was a former minister of one its Church of Scotland parishes between 1745 and 1757. In 1745 he led the men of Beith to Glasgow to defend King George III against the Young Pretender in the '45 rebellion. Despite receiving orders to return to Beith, Witherspoon carried on, was captured at the Battle of Falkirk and imprisoned for a time in Doune Castle. He later emigrated and became a member of the US congress and in July 1776 he voted for the Resolution for Independence. In answer to an objection that the country was not yet ready for independence, according to tradition, he replied that it "was not only ripe for the measure, but in danger of rotting for the want of it." Witherspoon was also the sixth president of Princeton University and showed great commitment to liberal education and republican government. He died in 1794 on his farm that he had built"Tusculum," just outside Princeton, and is buried in the Princeton Cemetery. –His direct descendants include actress Reese Witherspoon, and he is commemorated by statues in Washington D.C., at the University of the West of Scotland in Paisley, and a plaque, placed by DSDI in 2009 in Beith town centre.

=== Robert Tannahill ===
The Scottish Poet Robert Tannahill's relatives lived at Boghall Farm near Gateside. His mother, Janet Pollock, came from Boghall although she spent much of her life at the home of her uncle, Hugh Brodie, who farmed at Langcroft at the foot of Calder Glen, near Lochwinnoch. Robert Tannahill (3 June 1774 - 17 May 1810), was known as the 'Weaver Poet', his music and poetry is contemporaneous with that of Robert Burns and they both died when relatively young.

=== Henry Faulds ===
Henry Faulds, the originator of the concept of forensic use of fingerprinting, was born in Beith in 1843. A well-travelled man, he explained the suitability of fingerprinting for the identification of criminals and also wrote to Charles Darwin to forward his ideas. The letter was never published and he died in 1930, aged 86, bitter at the lack of recognition he had received for his work. His work in Japan is remembered by a memorial stone in Tokyo. In 2007 a memorial was also placed in view in Woolstanton near to St Margaret's churchyard, where he was laid to rest.

On 12 November 2004 a substantial memorial stone with interpretation plaques were dedicated to his memory in Beith town centre close to the site of the house in New Street where he was born.

=== Robert Aitken ===
Aitken was a land surveyor and cartographer who published in Beith a New Parish Atlas of Ayrshire in 1829.

== Industry ==
=== Textiles ===
About the time of the Act of Union, trade in linen cloth was introduced to Beith, which became so considerable, that the Beith markets were frequented by merchants from the neighbouring towns every week. By the 1730s, the declining linen cloth business was being succeeded by considerable trade in linen yarn. Crawford Brothers, flax spinners and makers of linen thread and shoe thread opened in Crummock in 1775 and moved to a factory at Barr Farm, Barrmill in 1836. The factory changed hands, continuing in production as the English Sewing Company until 1946. Beith merchants purchased the yarn made in the local area, and sold it to Paisley and Glasgow manufacturers. The demand for the commodity encouraged local farmers to raise great quantities of flax, and the linen yarn trade peaked around 1760. The manufacture of silk gauze superseded both trades and, from 1777 to 1789, the number of looms in the town producing the gauze peaked at approximately 170.

=== Furniture making ===
From 1845 until the 1980s, Beith had the honour of being the most important furniture-manufacturing town in Scotland with a reputation for high-quality furniture. The origins of the industry can be traced back to Mathew Dale who started by making hand-built furniture for local people in 1845. A former employee of Dale, Matthew Pollock progressed the manufacturing by introducing machinery in a factory setting 3 miles (5 kilometres) outside of the town at Beith North railway station. After approximately twelve years, Pollock and his brothers sold the factory to Robert Balfour, and moved into the town to expand their business. Balfour suffered the same problems as the Pollock Brothers in being unable to attract employees from the town willing to walk the 3 miles (5 kilometres) to work. In 1872, he built a factory near the Beith Town railway station and persuaded the railway company to build a siding to allow easy transportation of raw materials and finished products.

The industry expanded across the local area making it a centre of excellence in furniture manufacturing, and building its reputation throughout the world. In the late-1920s, transportation switched away from the railway but the industry continued to burgeon with many companies producing high-quality furniture: Macneill Bros, specialised in board room and library fittings, Stevenson and Higgins made lift cages, which were fitted in many hotels and department stores, Balfours were for a number of years the main manufacturers of mantlepieces in Scotland, some were designed in the elegant style, and required the skill of expert woodcarvers. Matthew Pollock Ltd supplied furniture to both the RMS Queen Mary and the RMS Queen Elizabeth II. I am from beith and believe it was beithcraft who supplied furniture for the RMS Queen Elizabeth II

Furniture is no longer produced in Beith due to the closure of the various manufacturing firms. The closures were caused by a multitude of problems such as the economic downturn, and an inability to compete with self-assembly furniture firms and their increase in popularity. The last major furniture manufacturer to close was Beithcraft (formerly Balfours) which finished in 1983 (after a major fire a few years earlier, which destroyed large sections of the plant) with the loss of 420 jobs. With this final closure came the end of Beith's reputation for being one of the main furniture manufacturers in the country.

This history of carpentry is remembered in the nickname of the local football team, Beith Juniors, who are commonly referred to as "The Cabes" (Cabinet Makers).

=== DM Beith ===
A large Defence Munitions (DM) centre is located between Beith and Barrmill. The site was originally developed in 1943 as a conventional Royal Naval Armaments Depot, munitions store, for the Royal Navy, the Ministry of Defence continues to maintain the armament depot, DM Beith, in the area.

As part of Ministry of Defence reorganisation plans in 2005, the 360 posts at DM-Beith were cut by 60. This was attributed to changes in the way equipment and supplies were stored and distributed, and it was hoped at the time, that it would reduce costs by £50m a year by 2010.

=== Regional industries ===
Historically in recent times, the major employers in the area were the Glengarnock Steelworks and the Linwood car manufacturing plant. Outwith the furniture industry, a large proportion of the local population were employed within these industries. At its peak, the local Steelworks had 3,000 employees, but by the time it closed in 1985 it had been reduced to 200. The Linwood car plant manufactured the Hillman Imp, a competitor to BMC's Mini, and provided up to 9,000 jobs during peak production but was closed by Peugeot-Citroen in 1981. It has been estimated that 13,000 workers were left jobless in the region as both direct and indirect consequences of the Linwood closure.

== Beith today ==
In 1966 a local survey estimated that 48% of the population worked outside the town whilst today the figure is more likely to be around 80%. The current population is around 6,000 helped by the completion of ten private housing estates dating from 1966 to the present and by redevelopment of sites within the town. The town has good transport links to Glasgow.

=== Deprivation and regeneration ===
North Ayrshire is ranked fifth highest in Scotland in terms of percentage of the population living in the most deprived areas. These areas have been targeted for regeneration by the local authority. This involves the targeting of activity and resources by the community planning partnership in relation to housing, crime, income, employment, health, skills and training and access to services.

A small area of Beith is one of three regeneration areas in the Garnock Valley. These are the smallest regeneration areas in Ayrshire. This is partly because rural deprivation tends to be less geographically concentrated than urban deprivation, and so it remains more hidden, being experienced by individuals and households rather than the larger communities. The area of Beith targeted for regeneration amounts to 359 households and 635 people (approximately 10% of the town's population).

== Town landmarks ==
=== The Auld Kirk ===
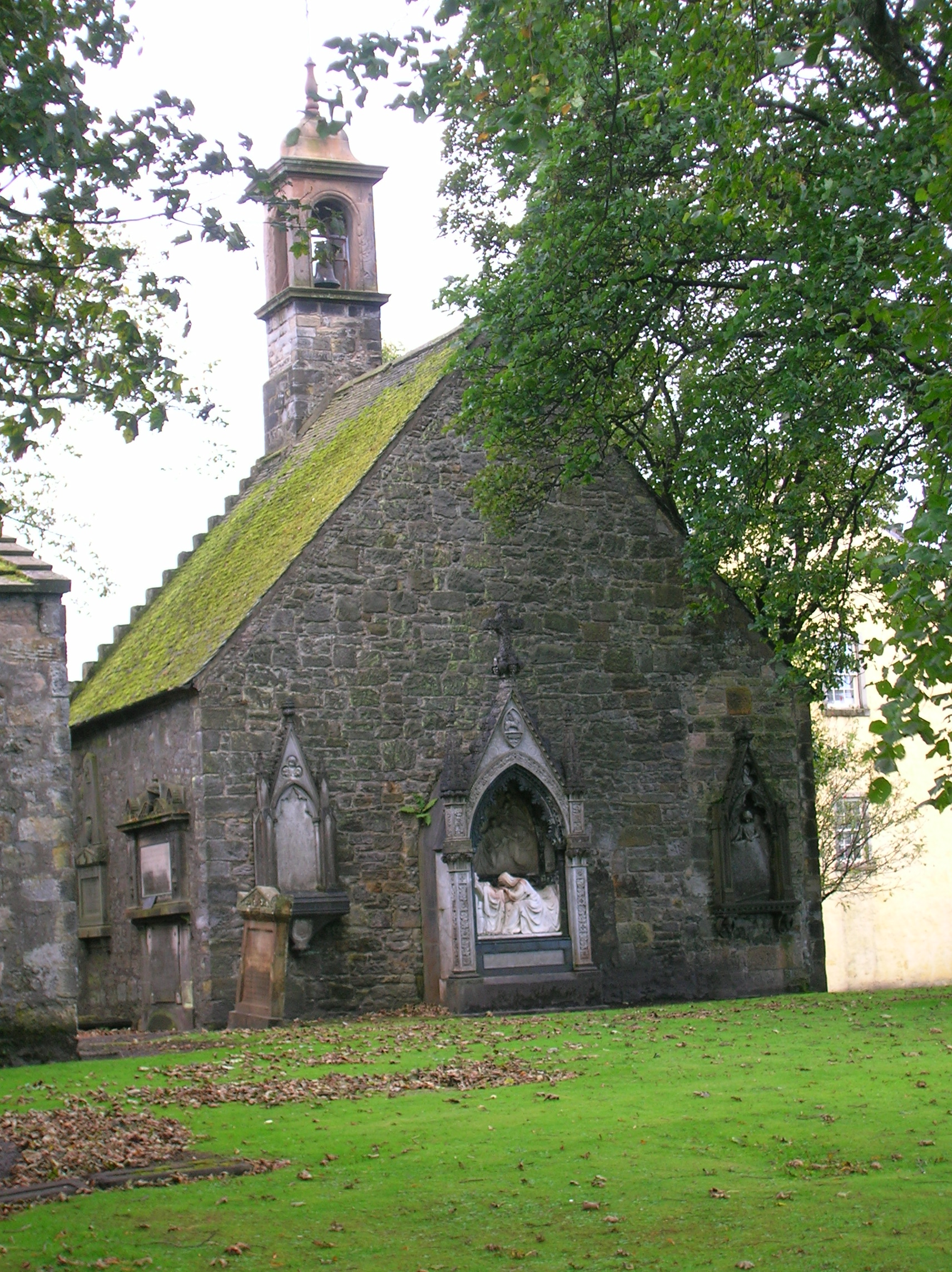
The Auld Kirk

The Beith Auld Kirk began as a parish church in 1593. It was built in the form of a cross and was dedicated to Saint Inan. A bell tower and clock were added in 1800. The old bell still stands, and bears this inscription: "This bell was given by Hew Montgomerie, sone of Hessilhead, anno 1614, and refounded by the Heritors of Beith, anno 1734″. The kirk had been built in a rather precarious position on a cliff-side, and from 1807 to 1810 it was rebuilt a little further up the hill as the new Parish Church. The Heritors then moved the older portions of the Auld Kirk to the new one, leaving only the front door, the clock and the belfry. There was not much left of the old kirk after that, and it came to be used as a burial ground for the Woodside family. Later on, however, it was closed for further burials and partly renovated, with the old high wall replaced by railings and paths dugs over the ground. Presently, there are no sepulchres of the old baronial families left standing, and the earliest graves date back only until 1710.

There are a number of memorials to the Spier and Dobie families within the grounds of the Auld Kirk, and also a memorial to Robert Patrick of Hazelhead (Inspector General of Army Hospitals). A sundial dating from the 1840s is also visible, and a stone coat of arms thought to originate from the Auld Kirk manse can be seen nearby, in Reform Street.

=== The Townhouse ===
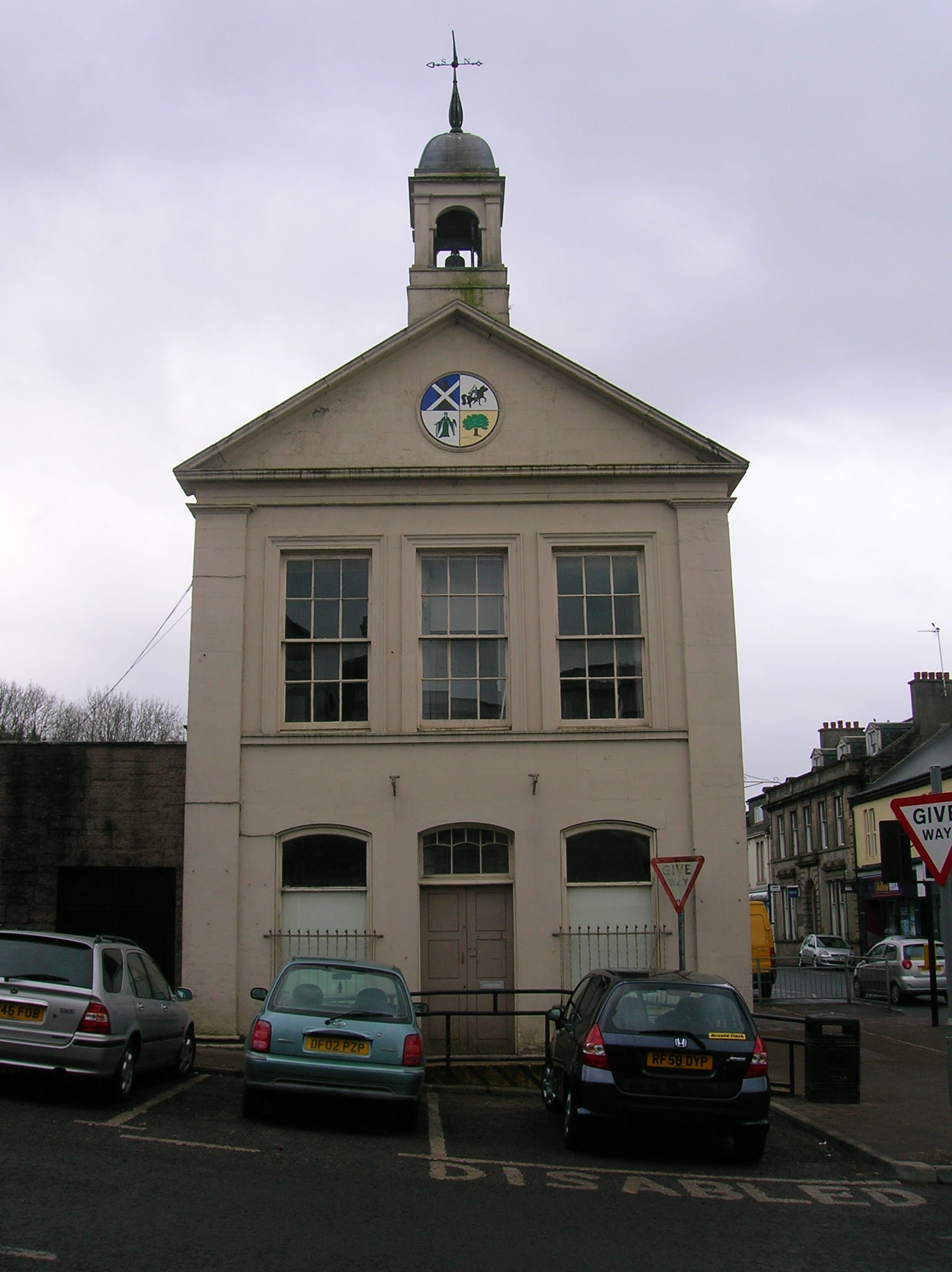
Beith Townhouse

Beith Townhouse was built by public subscription in 1817; the lower part of the building originally consisted of two shops, one of which was an ironmonger's operated by George B. Inglis from 1862 until around 1900. There was also a small room where prisoners were kept prior to their appearance in the upper hall which was used as a JP Court, Sheriff Small Debt Circuit Court, meeting of the road trustees and as a public meeting room. It was also used as a public reading room. For the first twenty years the management of the Town House was in the hands of the JPs of Beith, Dalry, and Kilbirnie, the heritors of the parishes, the proprietors of certain houses in Beith, and finally tenants of said houses within 1/2 mile (800 m) of the cross.

=== Places of worship ===
Beith hosts three listed 19th-century churches: Two Beith Parish Churches of the Church of Scotland, and the Roman Catholic Church of Our Lady of Perpetual Succour.

The Trinity Church was built in 1883, designed by architect Robert Baldie. The chief external feature is a graceful octagonal tower. The interior was destroyed by fire in 1917, and rebuilt in 1926. Gothic style, with rectangular nave, Gothic arched chancel and one transept on the east side. The stained glass windows are by John C Hall & Co. Organ 1937 by Hill, Norman & Beard. The church is a category C listed building.

The Beith High Church was built in 1807 and extended in 1885. Gothic T-plan kirk dominated by the tall five-stage tower. Stained glass by Gordon Webster. Harrison & Harrison pipe organ 1885. The High Church is a category B listed building.

Our Lady of Perpetual Succour RC Church was built with a churchyard, in 1816, to replace the 1761 building on a different site. Re-built in 1910, it became a Roman Catholic place of worship in 1921.

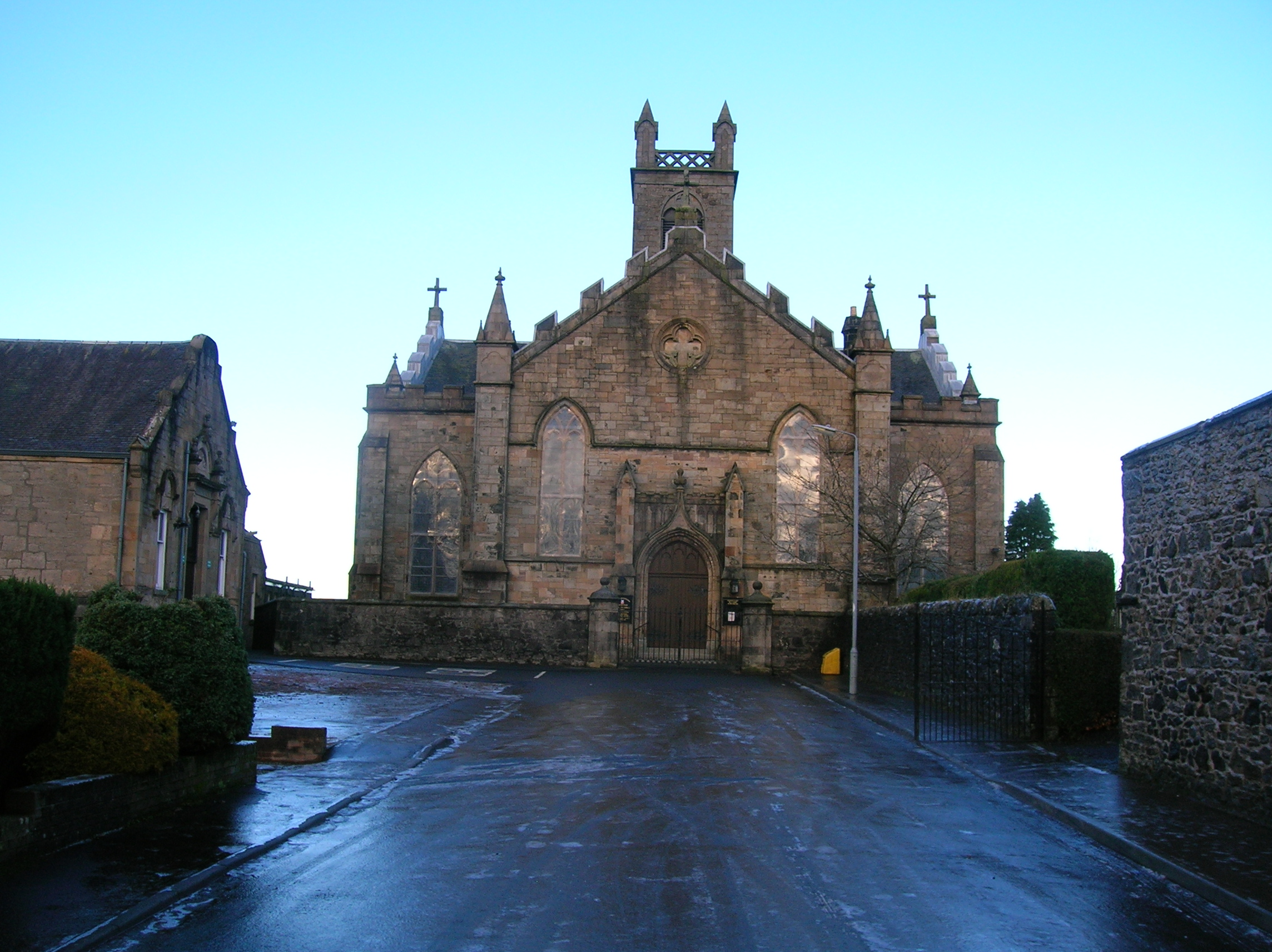
High Church

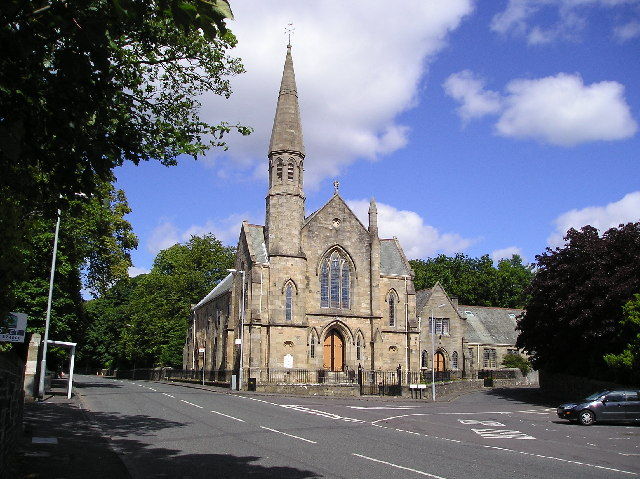
Trinity Church

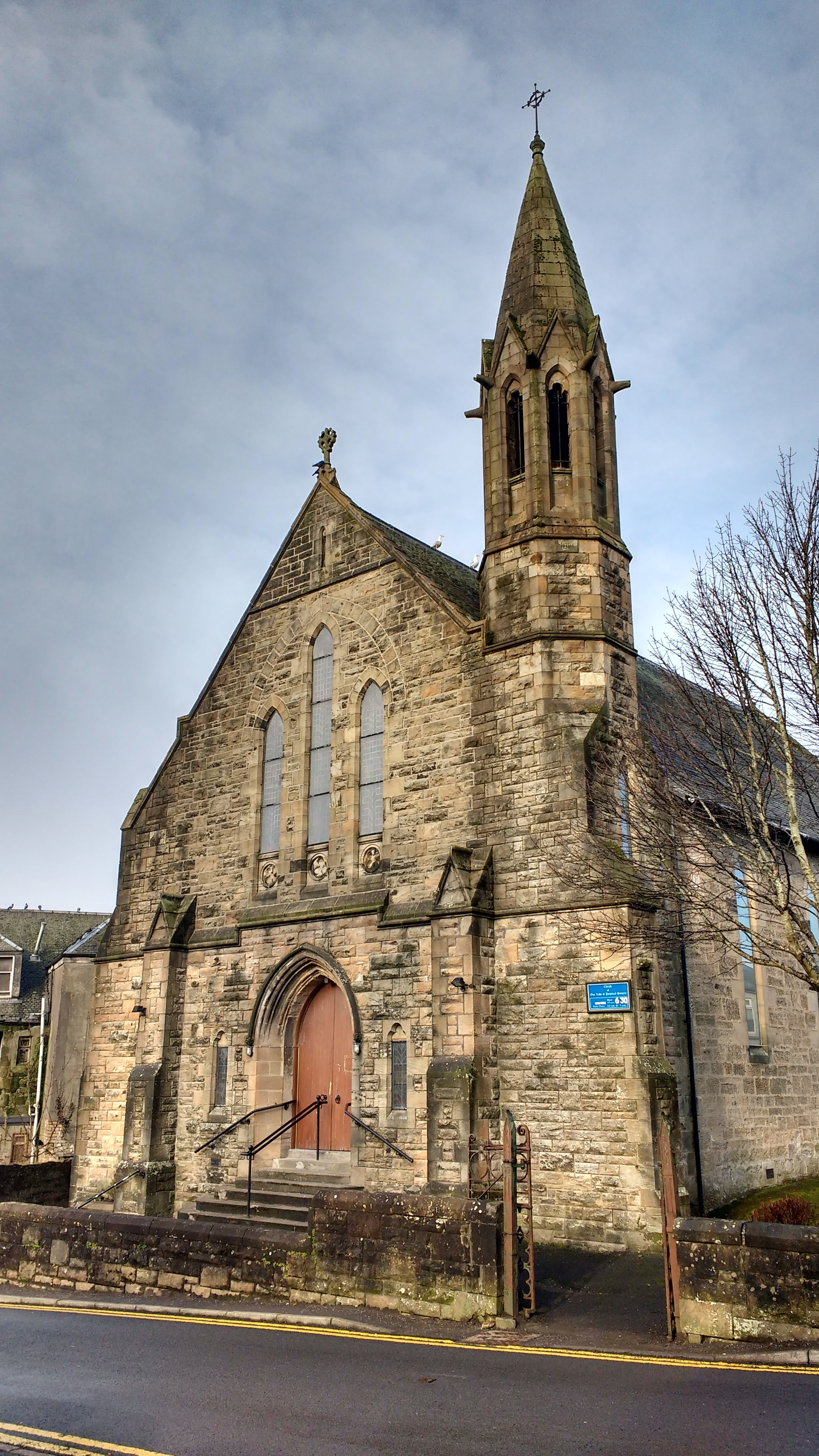
Our Lady of Perpetual Succour Church

=== Scapa Cottage ===
Scapa Cottage is known locally as "Dummy Cottage". The entire outside of the sandstone building is indented with marks giving it a most unusual appearance; in earlier years it was a Toll House. A deaf-and-dumb young man lived in the cottage in earlier times, hence the unfortunate acquired name "Dummy Cottage".

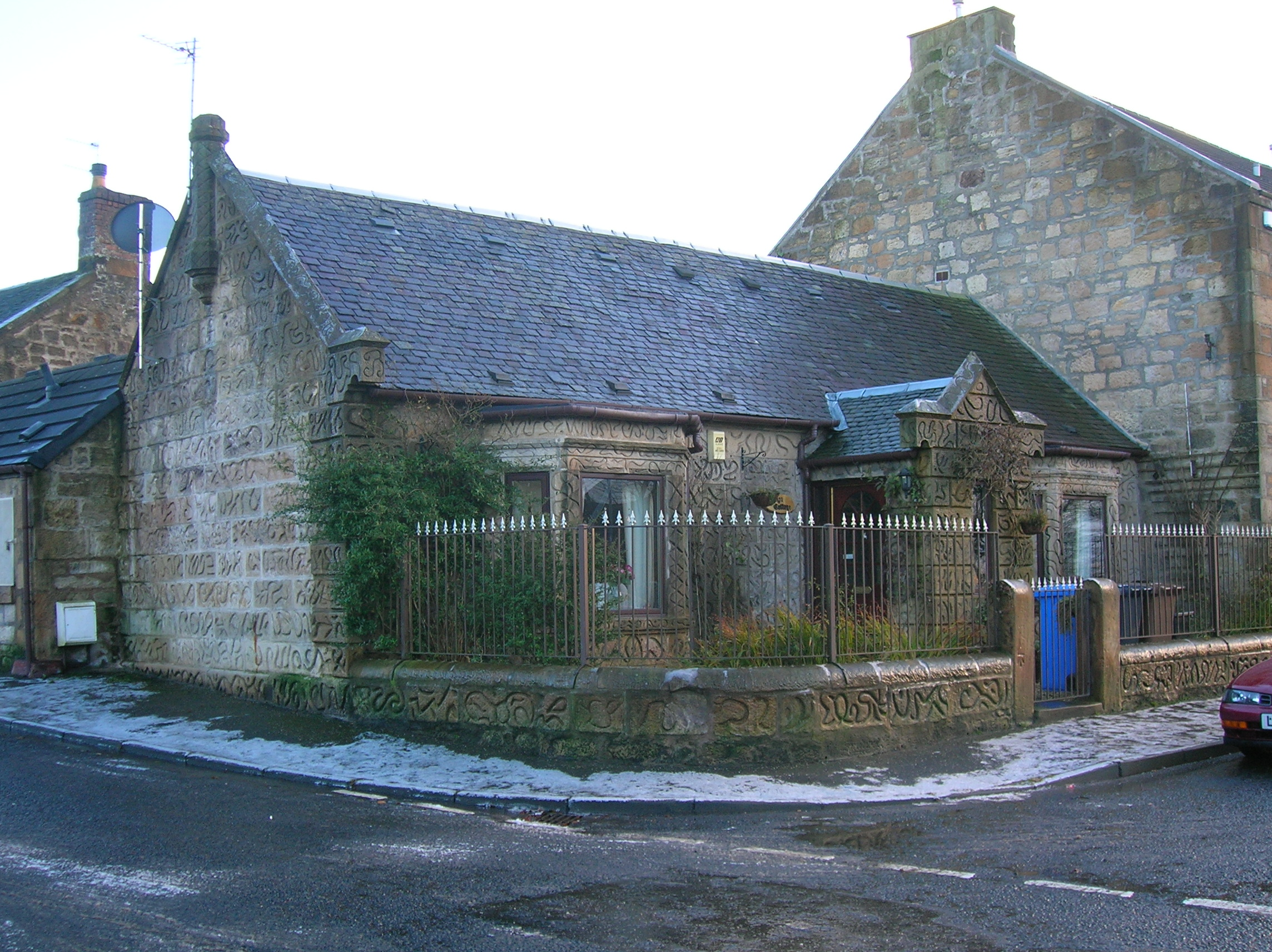
Scapa cottage

== Local landmarks ==
=== Kilbirnie Loch ===
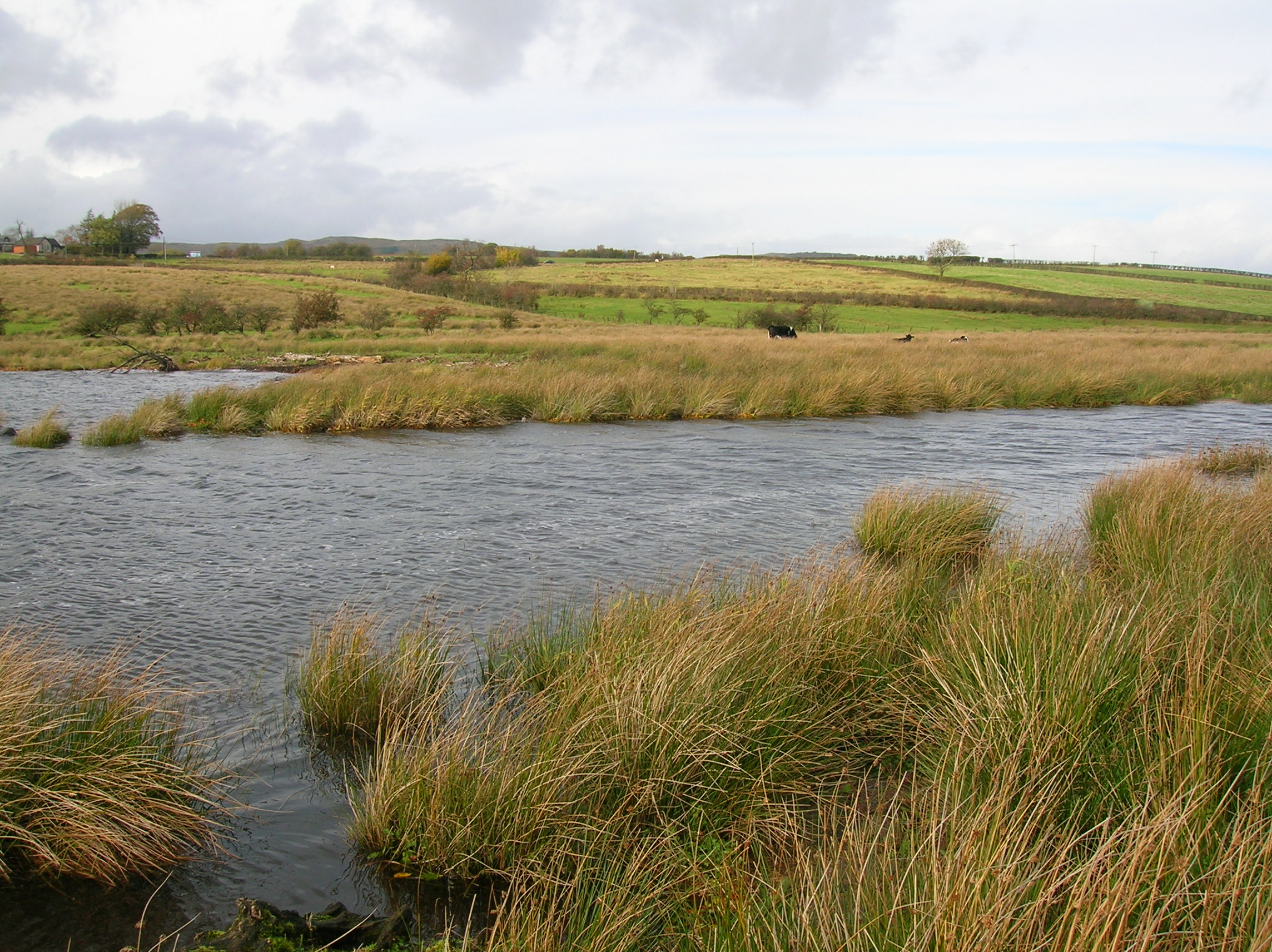
The Maich Water at its confluence with Kilbirnie Loch

Kilbirnie Loch (NS 330 543), is in the floodplain of between Kilbirnie, Glengarnock and Beith, and runs south-west to north-east for almost 2 km (1.2 mi), is about 0.5 km (0.31 mi) wide for the most part and has an area of roughly 3 square kilometres (740 acres). The loch is fed mainly by the Maich Water and is drained by the Dubbs Water that runs into Castle Semple Loch. Early authors often use the term "Garnoth" or "Garnott" and may be referring to a single large loch incorporating Kilbirnie Loch and Loch Winnoch (Barr and Castle Semple Lochs). Boece in his book of 1527 the Historia Gentis Scotorum (History of the Scottish People), says that this one entity was "nocht unlike the Loch Doune full of fische".

There is a long history of drainage schemes and farming operations in the Lochwinnoch area, with co-ordinated attempts dating from about 1691 by Lord Sempill, followed by Colonel McDowal of Castle Sempil in 1774, James Adams of Burnfoot, and by others. Until these drainage works Loch Winnoch and Kilbirnie Loch nearly met and often did during flooding, to the extent that, as stated, early writers such as Boece, Hollings and Petruccio Ubaldini regarded the lochs as one, using the name "Garnoth" or "Garnott".

=== Spier's school ===
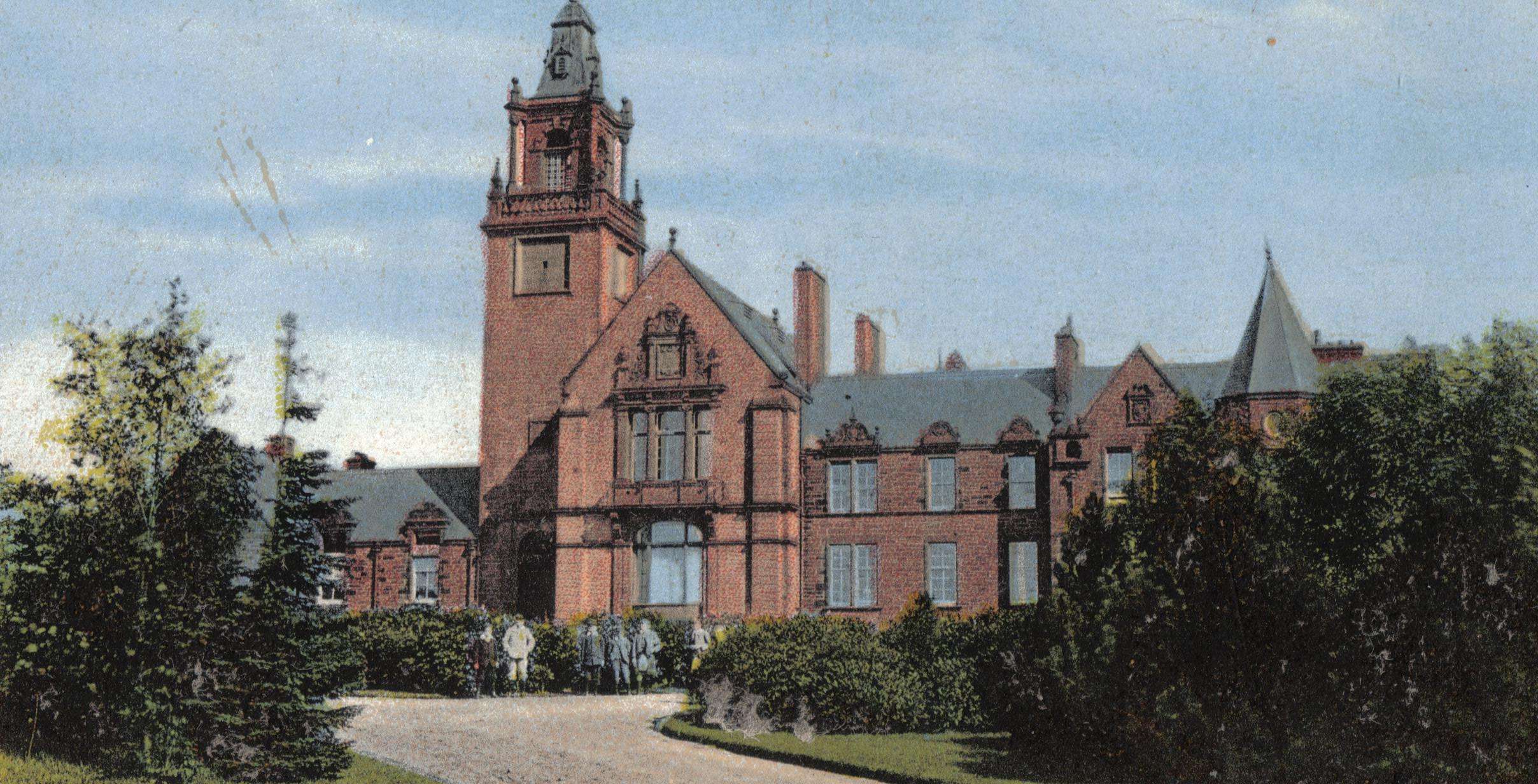
Spier's School

Spier's (pron. Speers) school stood on the Barmill Road near the old Marshalland Farm. It was built for Mrs Margaret Spier of the Marshalland and Cuff estate in 1887 to commemorate John Spier, her son, who had died at the age of 28, the last of her ten children. It was designed by Campbell Douglas. The school started as a fee paying day and boarding school, becoming part of the county education system in 1937. Following the construction of Garnock Academy, Spier's school closed in 1973 and the buildings were demolished in 1984. Robert Spier and family lived in Beith at number 62 Eglinton Street, formerly Whang Street, and they unusually had their own private chapel in the grounds.

The 16 acres (6 hectares) of woodland and gardens remain a popular site for dog walkers, bird watchers, and those out to enjoy the rural surroundings. There are a number of memorials to the Spier's family in the Auld Kirk grounds and in the local area. The Spier's family left a trust for providing financial help to those from the Garnock Valley pursuing further education. The Trust is a committee of North Ayrshire council. The trust committee decided in 2007 to investigate ways of making better use of the assets of the trust in particular the former school grounds and the council worked in partnership to set up a Friends of Spiers (FoS) organisation to develop ideas and seek funding. North Ayrshire Council was successful in an application to the Forestry Commission to provide funding for a footpath network around the woodland area.

=== Geilsland House ===
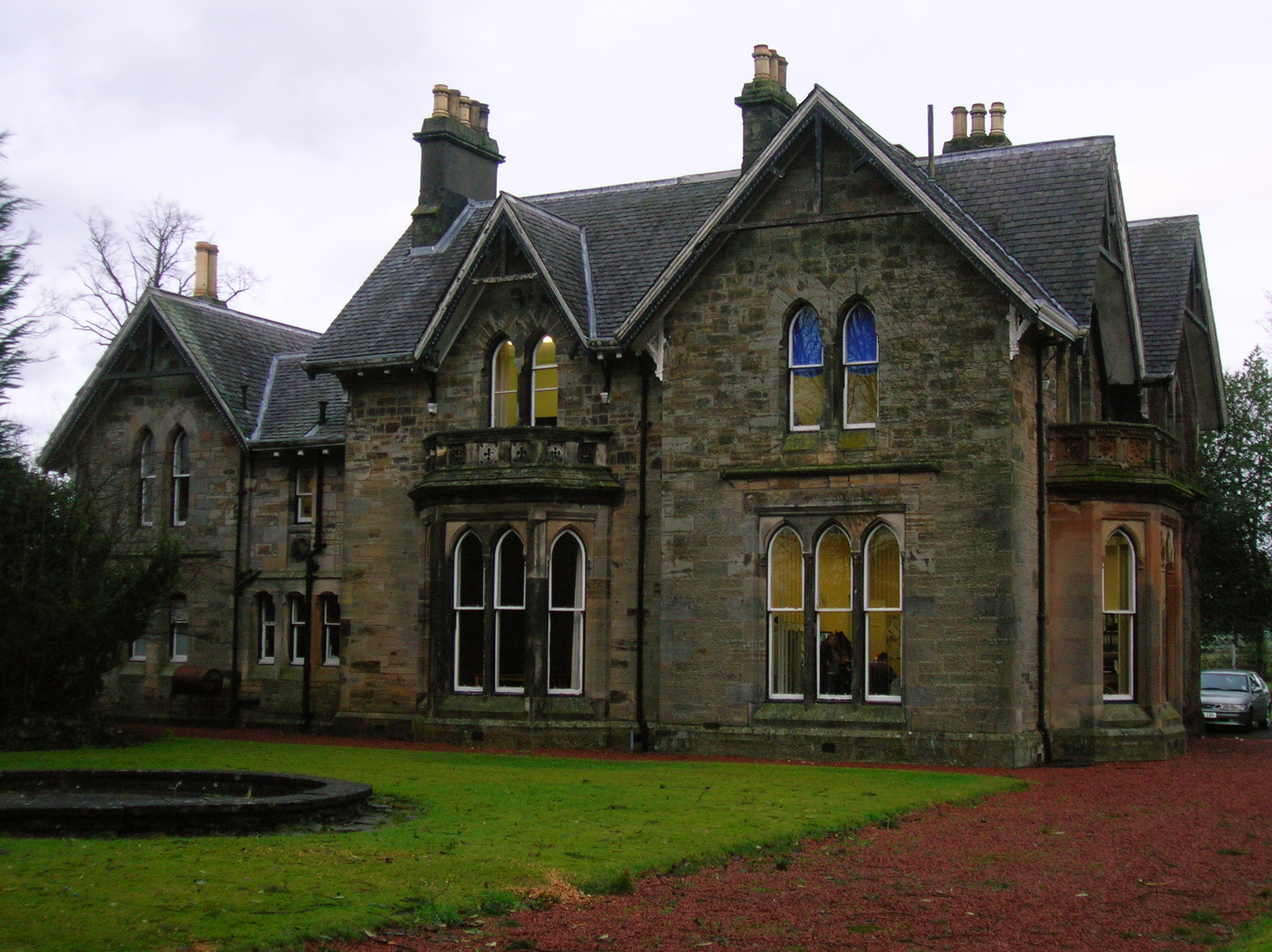
Geilsland House

William Fulton Love, writer and bank agent in Beith, built Geilsland House and developed this small estate near Gateside in the 19th century although the deeds go back to the 17th century. Geilsland was a special school, run by the Church of Scotland as part of its CrossReach initiative.

=== Crummock House ===
This mansion house and estate stood on the outskirts of Beith in an area now cut through by the main Dalry to Glasgow road. Built for the Kerr family in the 18th century, Crummock was sold in 1815 to William Wilson, who added to the house and improved the grounds. James Dobie, the historian and author, and his family lived here from 1836. Now demolished and a housing estate built on the site, some boundary walls and a cottage remain. Historic stones which had been built into the kitchen garden were donated to the North Ayrshire Heritage Centre, including the arched stone known as the shrine. Images of these shrine stones can be viewed in The Gallery section below. A plaque remembering James Dobie resides in Beith Auld Kirk.

=== The Court Hill ===
The Court Hill is near Hill of Beith, below the site of Hill of Beith Castle, Gateside, in the old Barony of Beith. Dobie states that this is the moot hill on which the Abbot of Kilwinning used to administer justice to his vassals & tenants. It is a sub-oval, flat-topped mound, situated at the foot of a small valley. A number of large stones are visible in the sides of the mound. It is turf-covered, probably situated on a low outcrop, and is mostly an artificial work. Pre-dating the channelling of the burn which detours around it, the mound was probably isolated in this once marshy outflow of the former Boghall Loch (see NS35SE 14).

In the 12th century the Barony of Beith was given to the Tironensian monks of Kilwinning Abbey by the wife of Sir Richard de Morville. The farm or Grange of the monks is indicated by the name Grange Hill and a castellated tower indicated as once existing in the area may have been the local dwelling of the Abbot of Kilwinning when he was visiting the barony to deliver justice at the Court Hill or attend to other business and later the local laird. No clearly undisputed remains have been found of the tower or grange buildings, however the New Statistical Account of 1845 written by the local minister, George Colville, states that the castle stood close to the Court Hill.

=== Boghall Loch ===
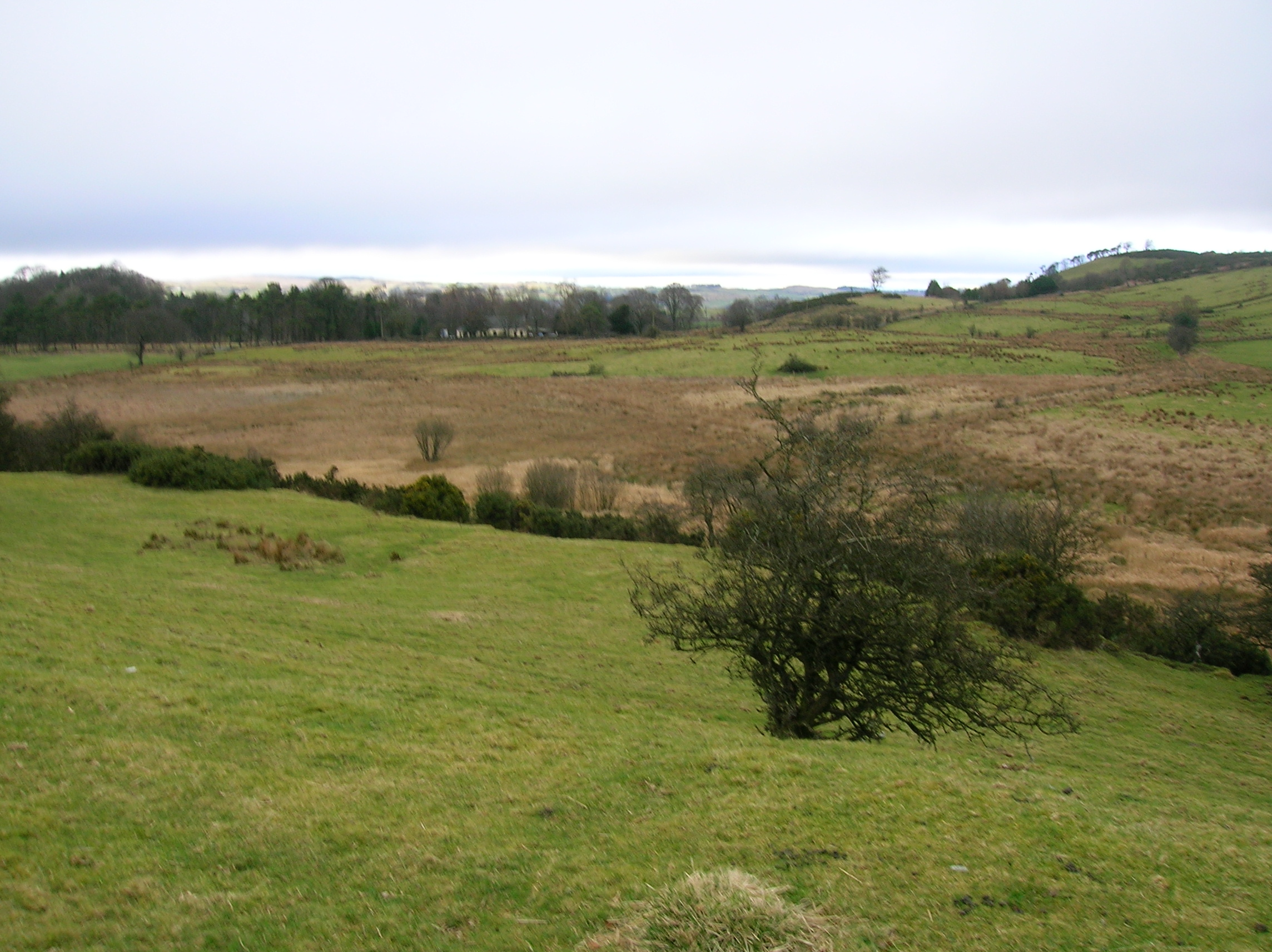
The site of Loch Brand

Loch Brand or Bran was the name by which Boghall Loch was formerly known. The loch, now almost completely drained, is the main source of the Powgree Burn and partly lay on the lands of Boghall. On or around the margin of the loch piles or stakes of oak or elm have been discovered and it is thought that these may be the remains of crannogs.

=== Beith Rocking Stone ===
The Beith Rocking Stone, sits on top of Cuff Hill. According to local folklore, Saint Inan frequented the stone. Legend states that the stone rocked from side to side on an unseen fulcrum, however this is no longer the case and the stone is now fully set into the ground. An article was published in Cumnock Chronicle in 1907 on the reason for the stone being dislodged. Signed by a Messer's Robert Boyle & Robert Currie.

=== Willowyards (Angel's Share fungus) ===
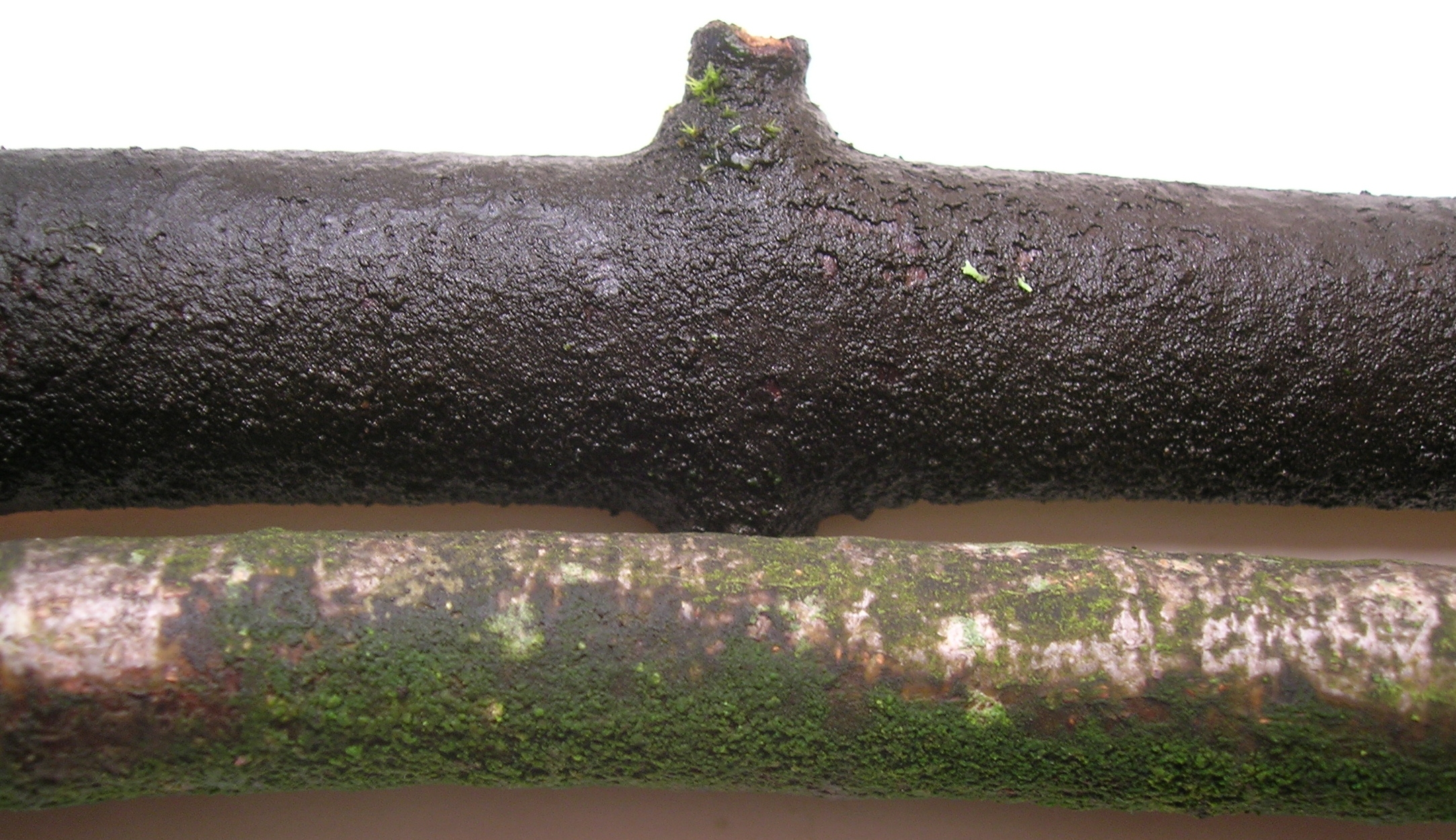
The Angels' Share fungus on Sycamore from Mains with a normal branch from Spier's

The area surrounding Willowyards and its whisky bond are characterised by a black staining that covers all living and non-living surfaces to varying degrees. The research that first led to the scientific identification of the organism causing this black and velvety encrustation was partly carried out using samples from Willowyard. The organism causing what is commonly known as 'Warehouse Staining', is a black fungus, Baudoinia compniacensis which is harmless and feeds upon the 'Angels's Share' of alcohol evaporating from the whisky barrels.

== Demographics ==
Country of birth, 2011
1. Scotland (91.2%)
2. UK (other) (6.90%)
3. EU (0.80%)
4. Other country (1.20%)
5. 0.00%
6. 0.00%

According to the Office for National Statistics, based on the 2011 Census estimates, 91.2 per cent of the 6,200 inhabitants of Beith were born in Scotland, with 6.9 per cent born in the United Kingdom, 0.8 per cent from other countries in the European Union and 1.2 per cent classified as other country.

The 2011 Scotland census reported 99.2 (6,156) per cent of people from Beith being White, 0.4 per cent are Asian, followed by mixed/multiple descent being 0.3 per cent and 0.1 per cent reported "Other" origins.

== Social and cultural life ==
=== Saint Inan's Fete ===
There is an annual celebration that parades through the town each summer. It normally commences outside the town's Community Centre, going through the town and ending in the grounds of the Primary School for the Fete in the afternoon. A gala dance is normally held in the evening.

=== Friends of Spiers (FoS) ===
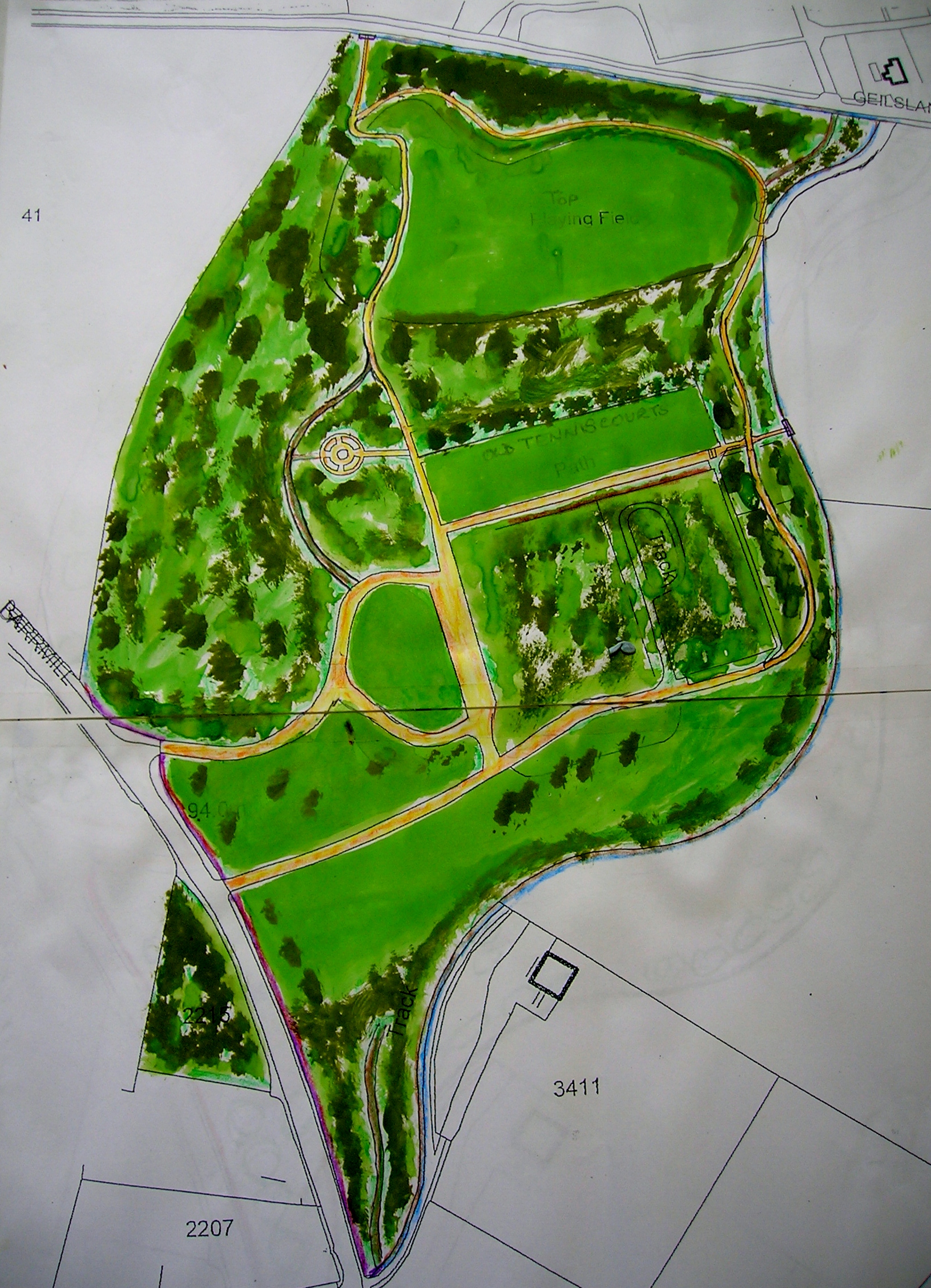
Spier's Old School Grounds.

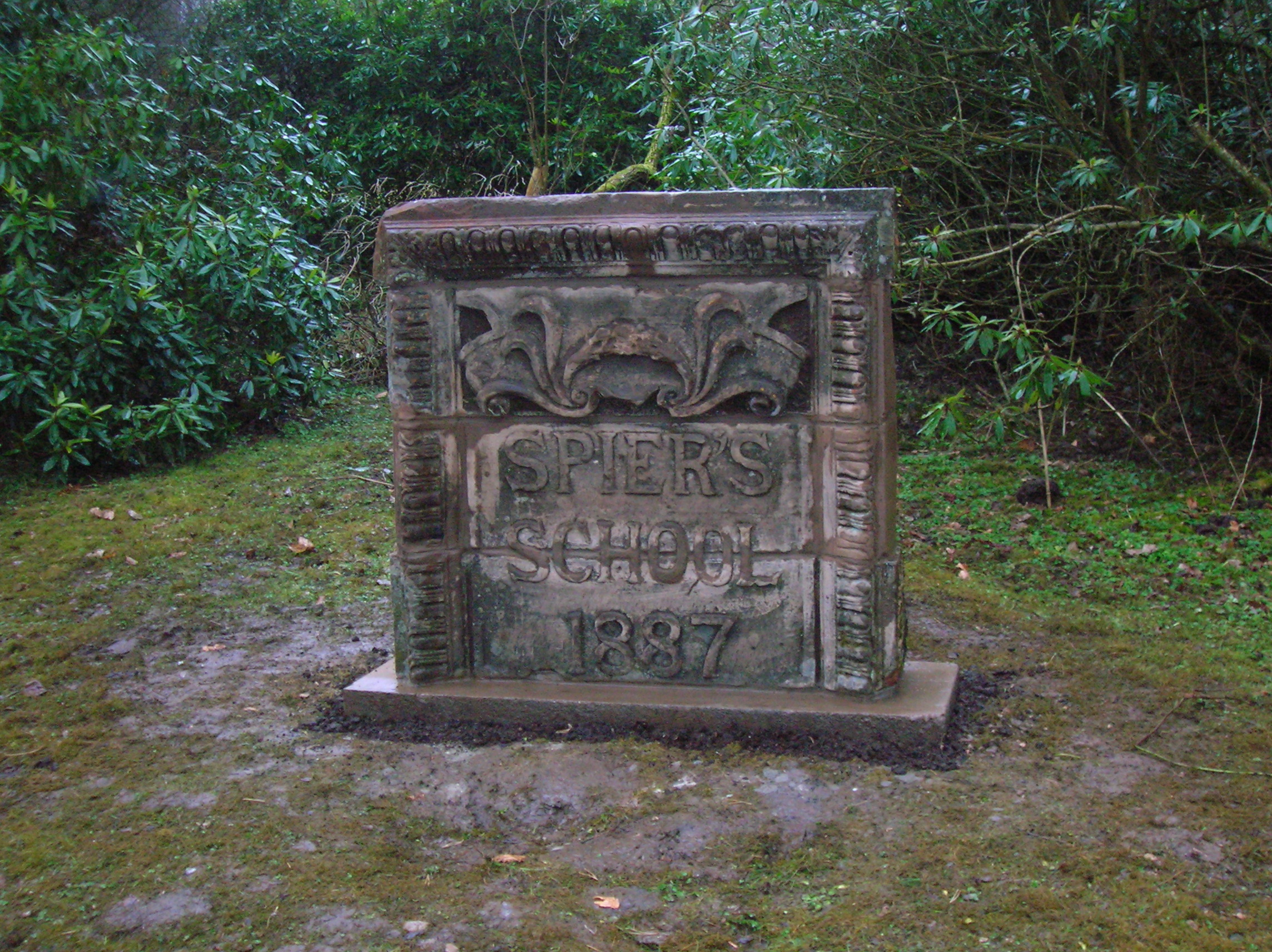
Spier's Commemorative Wall

This is a support group, affiliated to The Conservation Volunteers (TCV), which works with the Spier's Trust, North Ayrshire Council Ranger Service & Beith Cultural & Heritage Society.

The first substantial signs of the regeneration of the site was the construction of the Spier's Commemorative Wall, erected in 2010, resurfacing of the paths and roads within the site and the restoration of the Coronation Garden, completed in 2011.

=== Youth Making Beith Better (YMBB) ===
The YMBB youth group was set up by members of the community to give the young people of Beith and district an opportunity to involve themselves in improving their town and the surrounding area, whilst at the same time providing a forum for learning additional skills, sharing ideas and socialising with their peers. The group was closely involved with the Saint Inan's parade and other local events.

YMBB met in the Beith Community Centre twice a week, supervised by adults from the NAC Youth Services. The YMBB committee included youth members, adults from the community and local councillors who assist in the overview of the group and with forward planning.

=== Beith Theatre Group ===
Beith Theatre Group began in 1990 and started out as Beith High Drama, as part of Beith High Church raising funds for roof repairs.

When Beith High Church and Beith Trinity Church joined in the late 2000s, Beith High Drama changed its name to Beith Amateur Dramatics, subsequently changing its name to Beith Theatre Group post Covid lockdown in 2022 to reflect the new direction the group has taken.

Beith Theatre Group performs for the community of Beith and the wider community of the Garnock Valley, producing two to three productions a year, all culminating to the widely anticipated annual pantomime performed at the end of the second week of December.

Beith Theatre Group is a charity run under the auspices of Beith Parish Church. It has its own Committee charged with the day-to-day management of the group.

This is a community-based group that brings together many people from the Ayrshire region. In Beith, they host lighthearted, entertaining events within a safe and inclusive environment, where everyone is encouraged to give their best.

Beith Theatre Group meets twice weekly on a Wednesday evening and Sunday afternoon, any one above the age of 11 can join.

== Transport ==
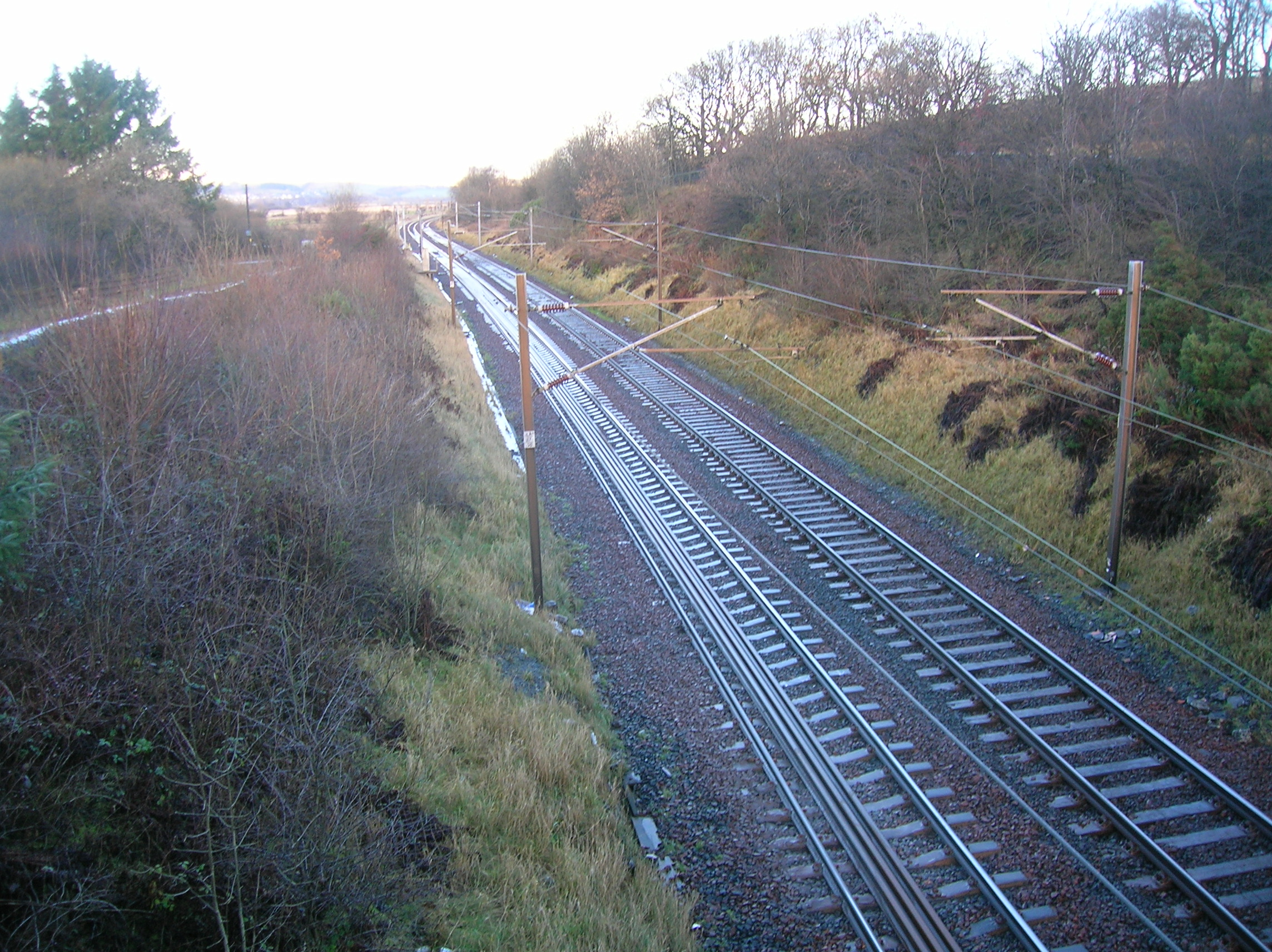
The site of the old Beith North "Low" railway station

The town was once served by two railway stations: Beith North, commonly referred to as "the Low station" and Beith Town. Beith North closed in 1951 and the Beith Town station closed in 1962. The nearest railway station is just over 2 miles (3 kilometres) away, at Glengarnock which provides direct rail links to Glasgow Central station and services to the Clyde coast and Glasgow Prestwick airport.

Beith is approximately 13 miles (21 kilometres) south-west of Glasgow International Airport, 21 miles (34 kilometres) north of Glasgow Prestwick airport and 60 miles (100 kilometres) west of Edinburgh Airport.

== Leisure and sport ==
=== Football ===
The local football club, Beith Juniors, formed in 1938 to succeed Beith who had played in the Scottish Football League in the 1920s. The team participate in the Lowland League West and play their home games at Bellsdale Park, which is famous for its slope. The club's most famous former player is Steve Clarke, who went on to play for St Mirren and Chelsea, and has been the manager of West Bromwich Albion, Reading and Kilmarnock. He is the current manager of the Scotland national team.

=== Beith Astro ===
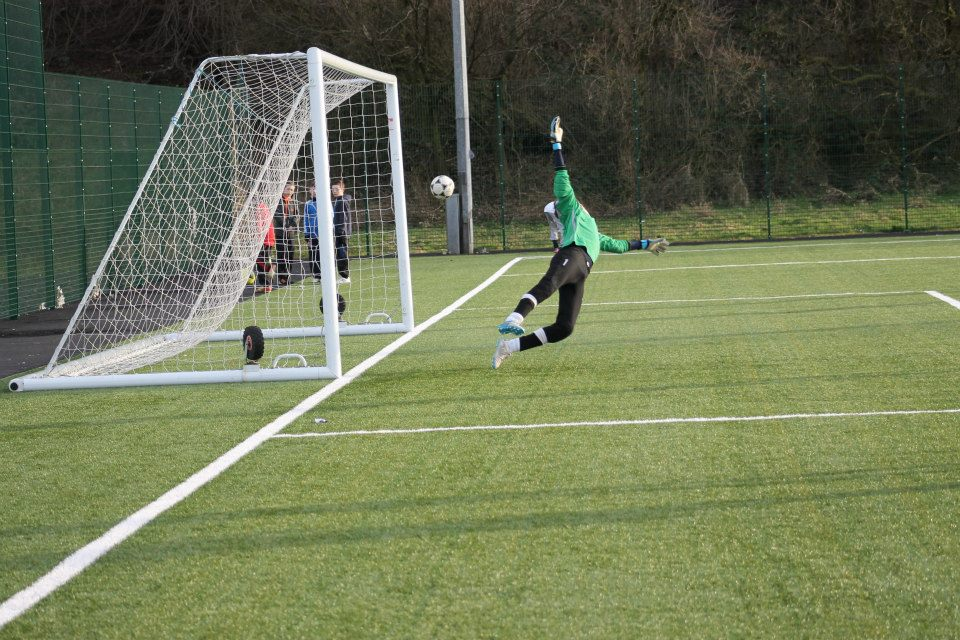
Beith Astro

Beith Astro was generated through the enabling efforts of the Beith Trust. As a result of campaigning and lobbying throughout 2010, North Ayrshire Council committed £300,000 towards the refurbishment of the synthetic pitch in advance of the facilities coming under community management in April 2012. Beith Trust also enabled community ownership of two grass pitches, and changing pavilions.

Beith Astro is an eleven-a-side, full-size synthetic astro pitch now used by not only the trust and its affiliated community programmes and groups but also Beith Juniors Football Club and all twelve Beith Community Football Clubs.

=== Rugby ===
Beith's only rugby football club, Old Spierians was amalgamated, along with Dalry High School FP into Garnock RFC in 1972 when Spier's School, Dalry High, Kilbirnie Central and Beith Academy schools were closed to form Garnock Academy. The Old Spierians club had been founded in the early years of the 20th century and joined the Scottish Rugby Union in 1911. Garnock play their home games at Lochshore on the banks of Kilbirnie Loch and currently (2010) participate in the Scottish Hydro Premier League 3.

=== Golf ===
Beith also has its own 18-hole, 68-par golf course, in the Bigholm area just east of the town, a short walking distance from Saint Inan's chair at Lochland's Hill.

=== Cinema ===
The town's George cinema was put up for sale in the autumn of 1982, but a surprisingly good run of E.T. over that Christmas period helped keep it open until the following summer. It finally closed on 25 June 1983 for conversion to a snooker club, although the building has since been demolished.

== People from Beith ==
- Archibald Clark (1805–1875) First Mayor of Auckland City
- James McCosh Clark (1833–1898), 8th Mayor of Auckland City
- Sandy Brown (1879–1944), footballer
- James Chalmers, footballer

== Gallery and other images ==
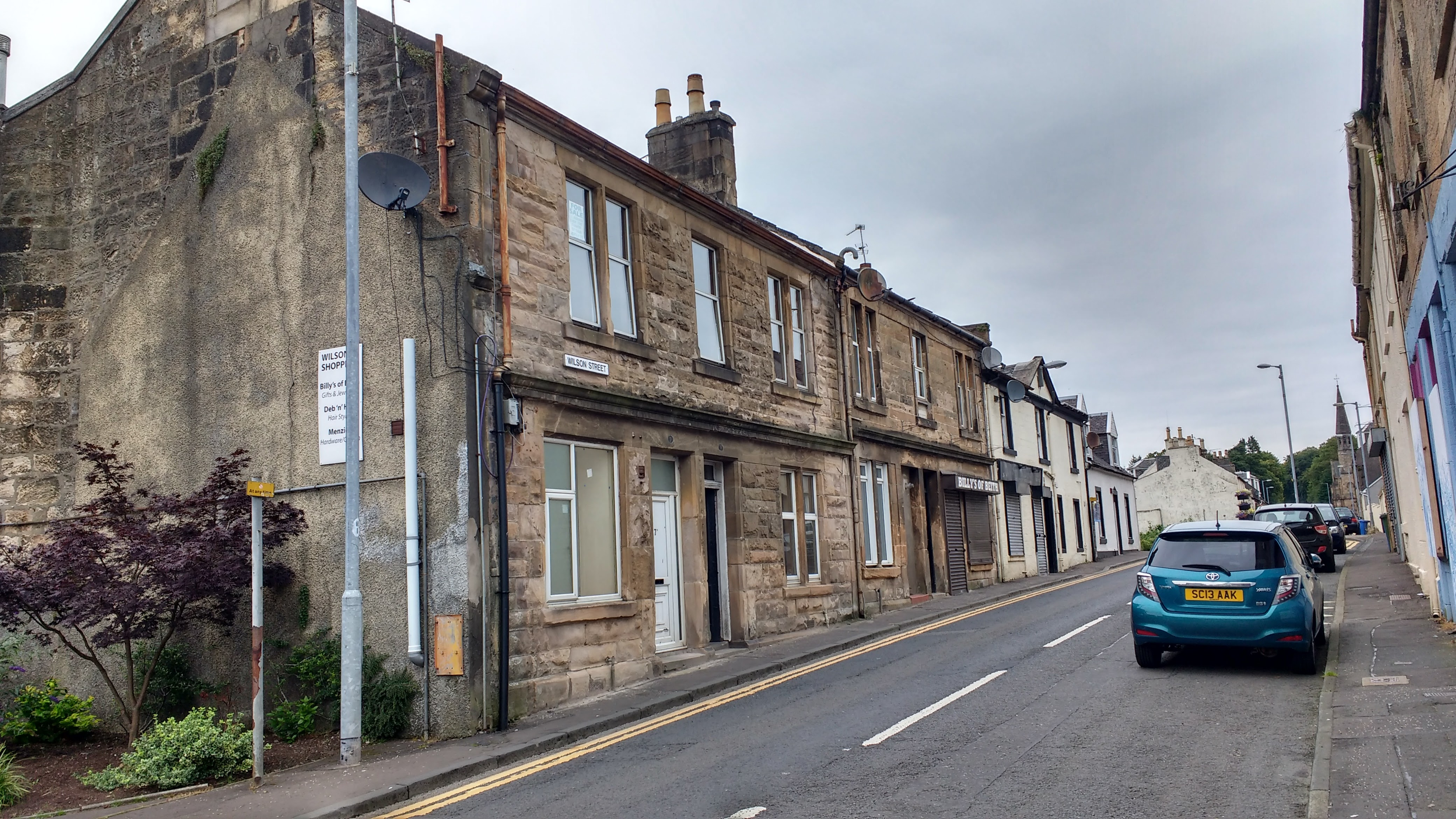
Wilson Street

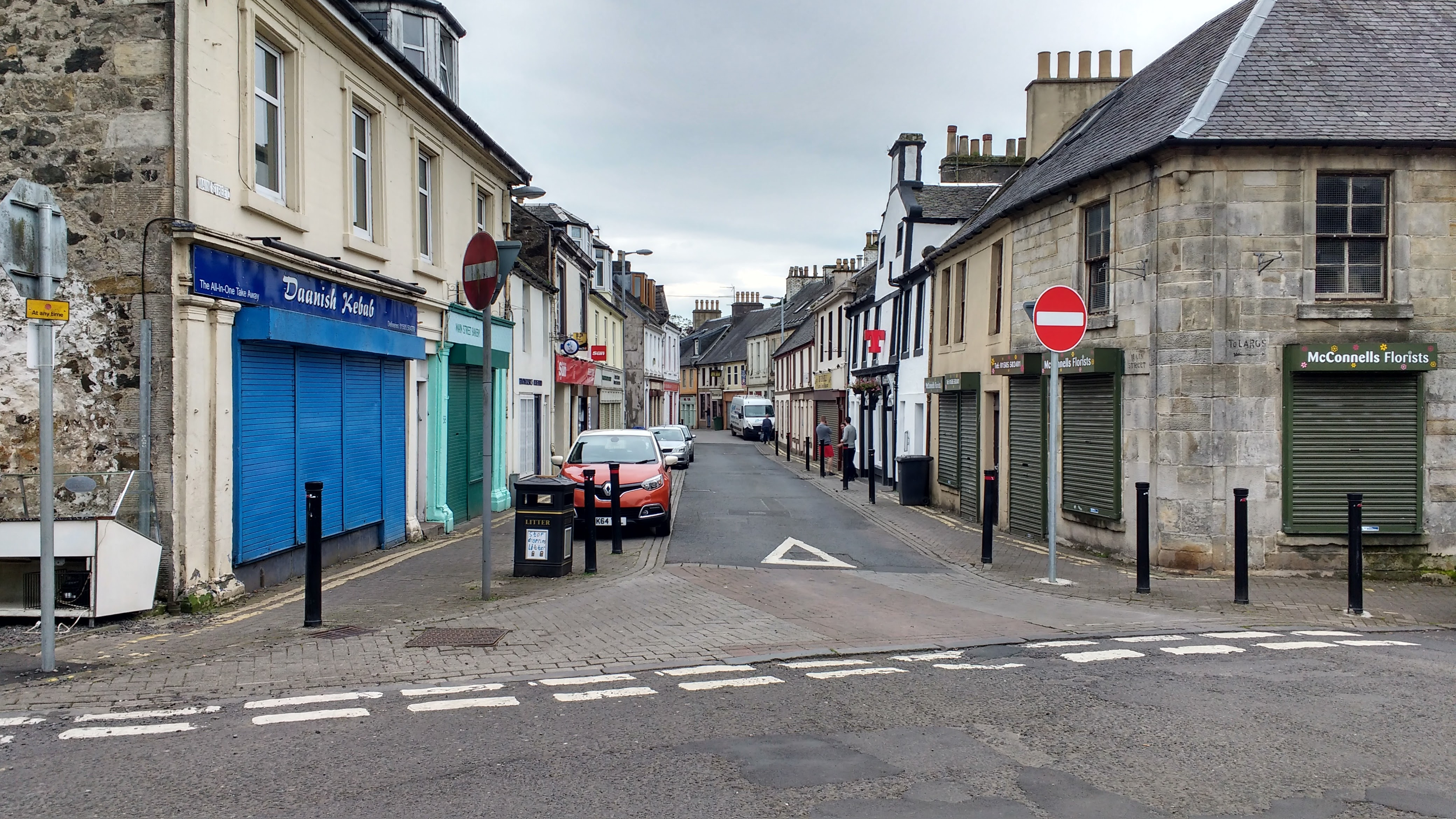
Main Street

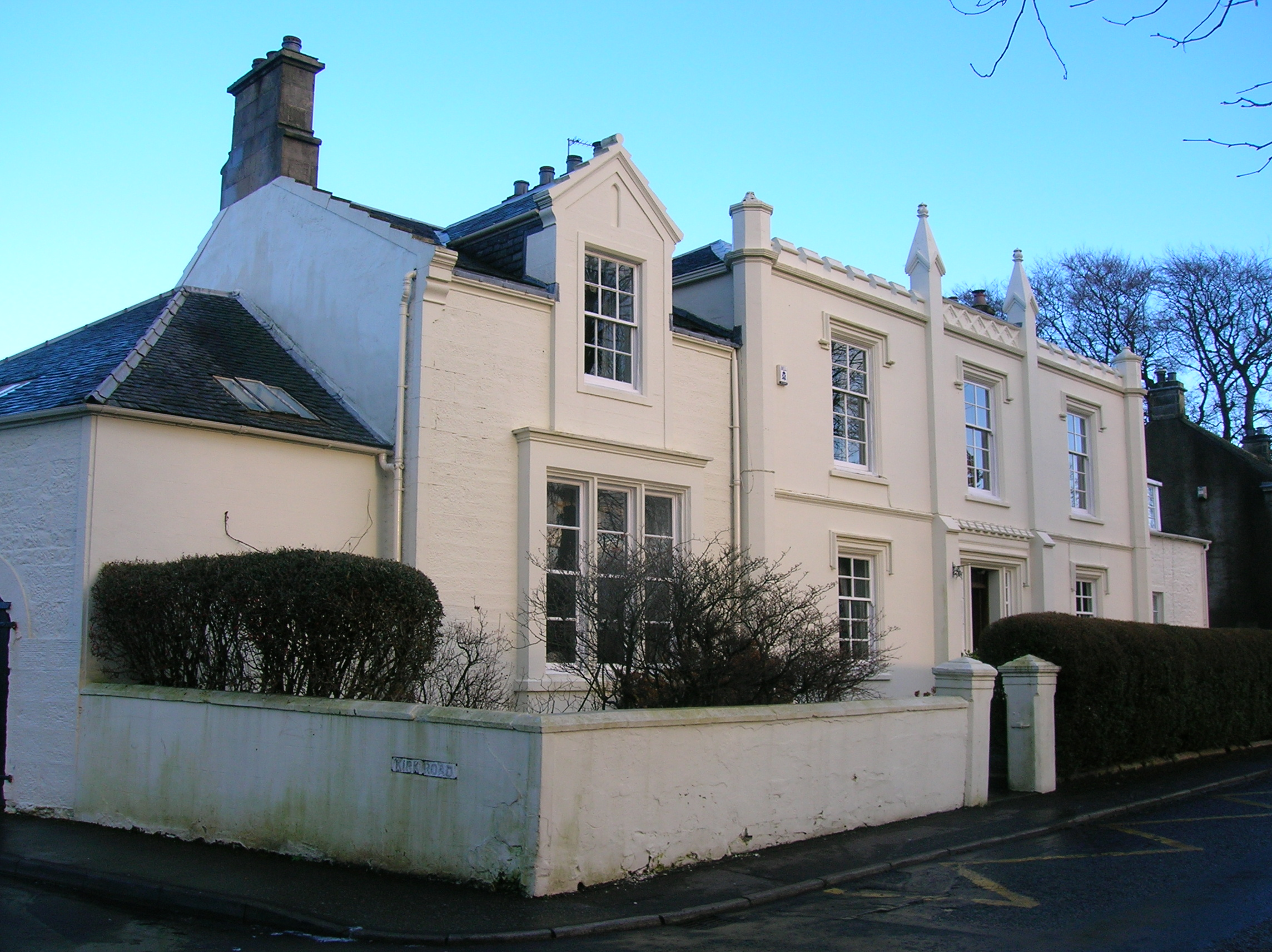
House on Barmill Road

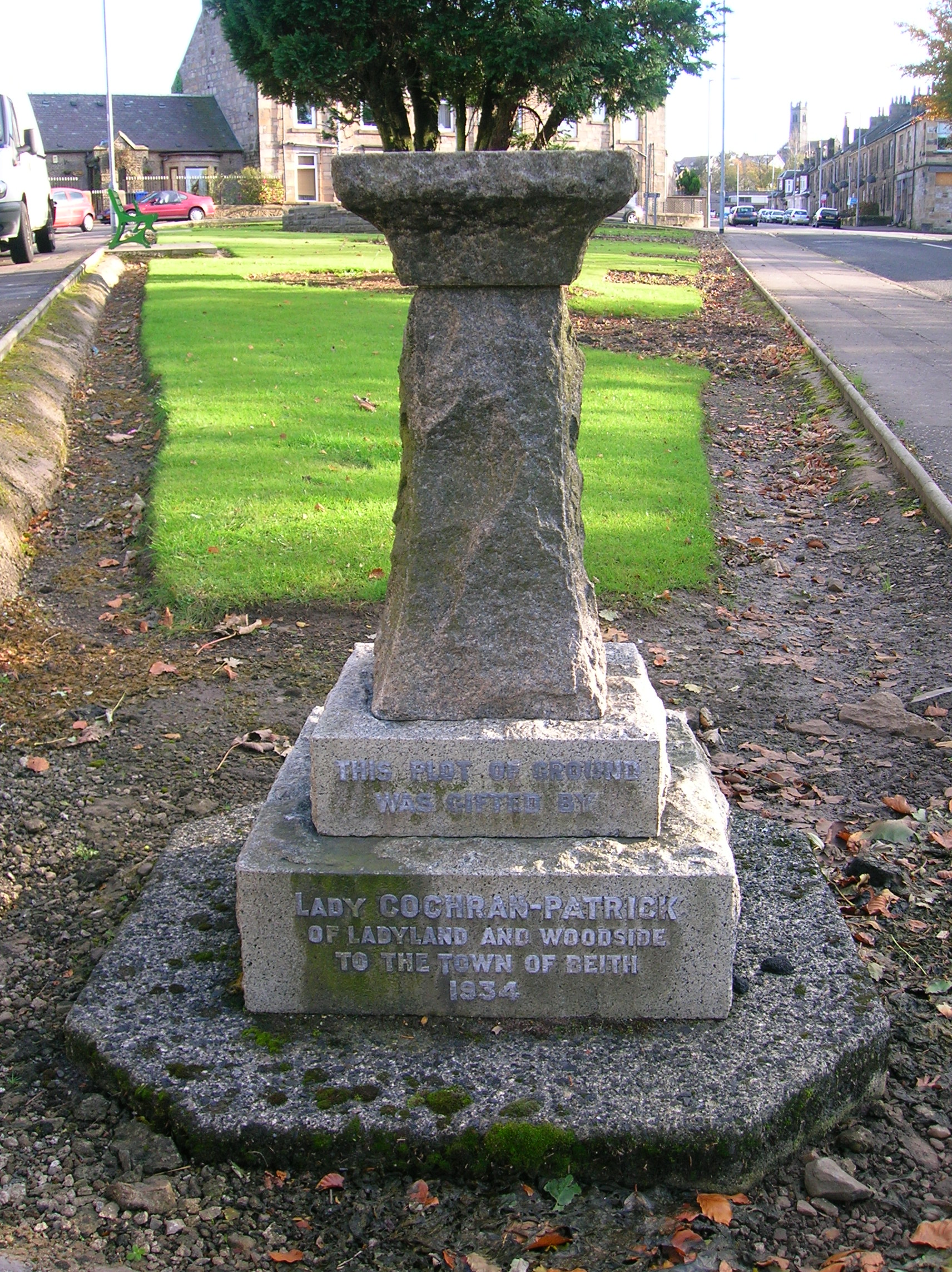
A sundial recording the donation of the Beith War Memorial plot by Lady Cochran-Patrick of Ladyland and Mosside

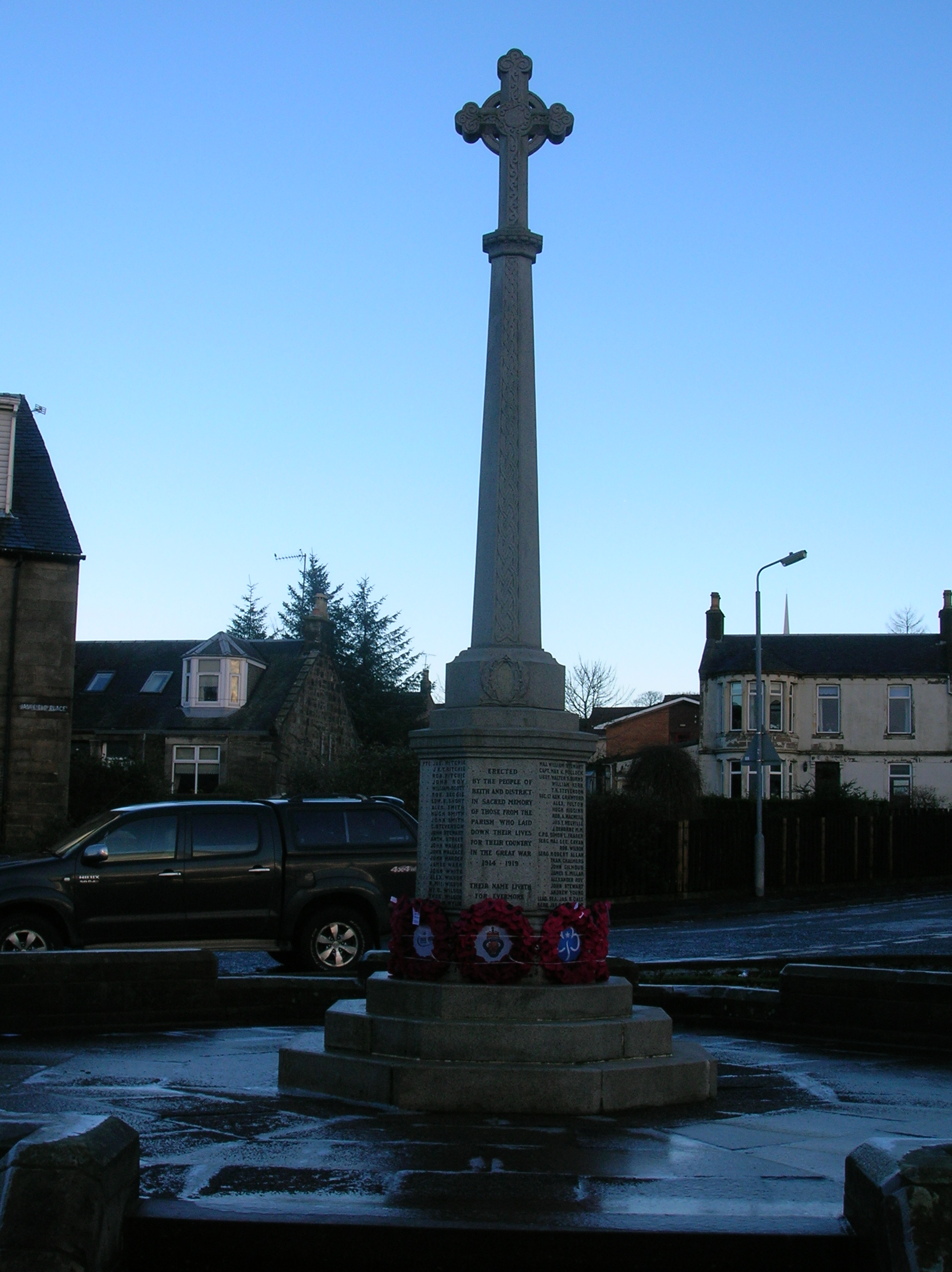
The War Memorial

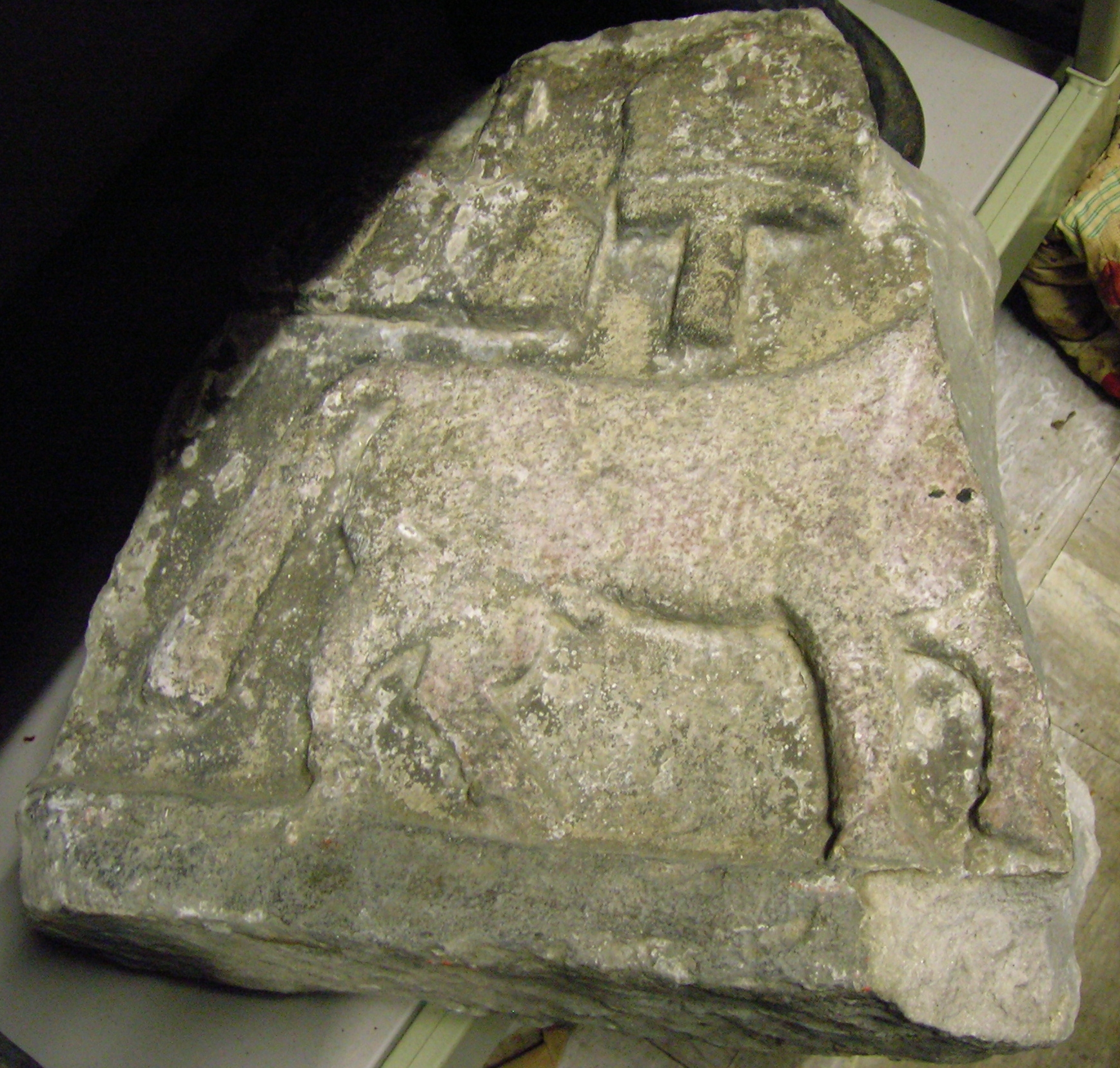
Shrine Stone: A horse with what may be a mason's tools above

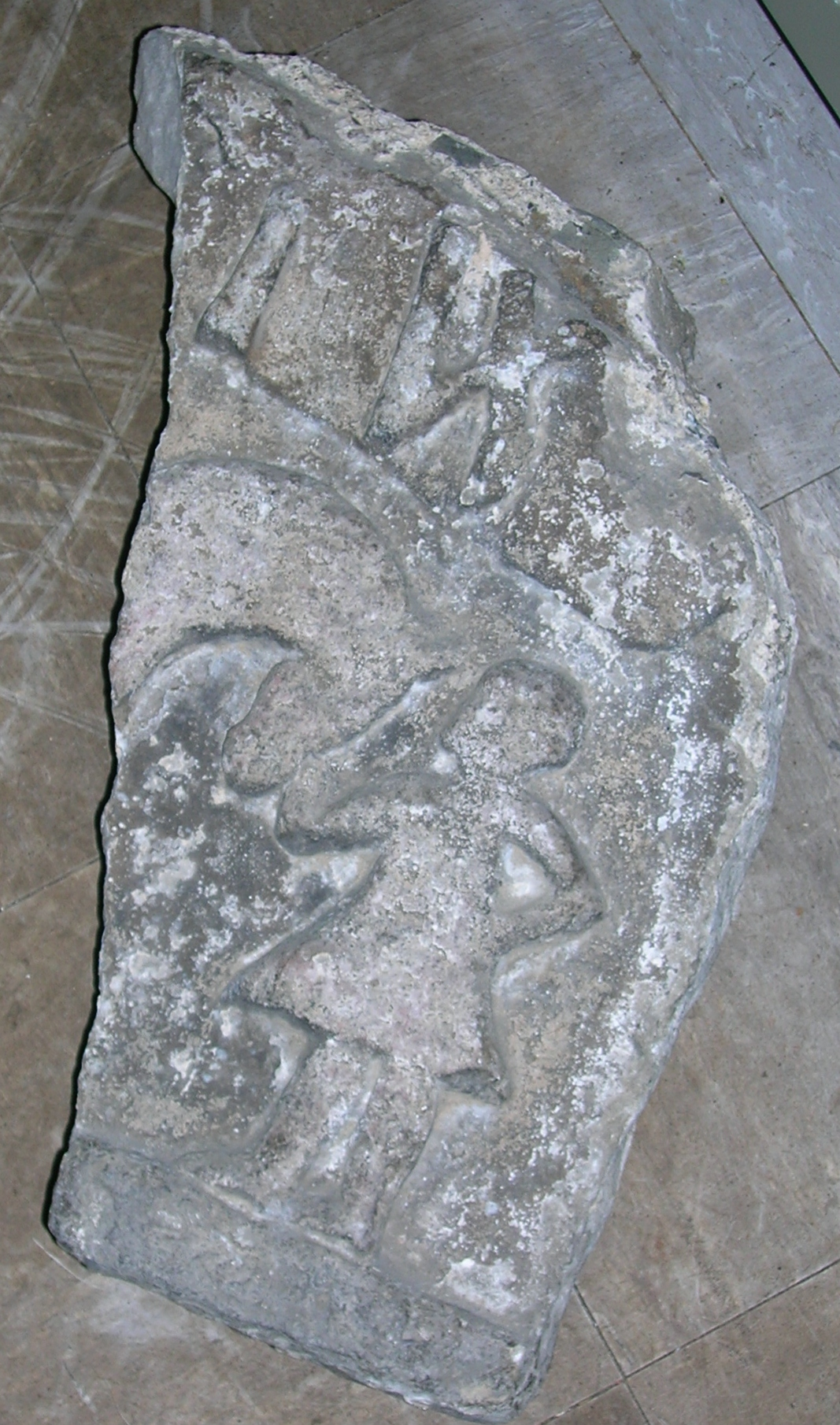
Shrine Stone: A standing figure holding a horse with carved letters or tools above

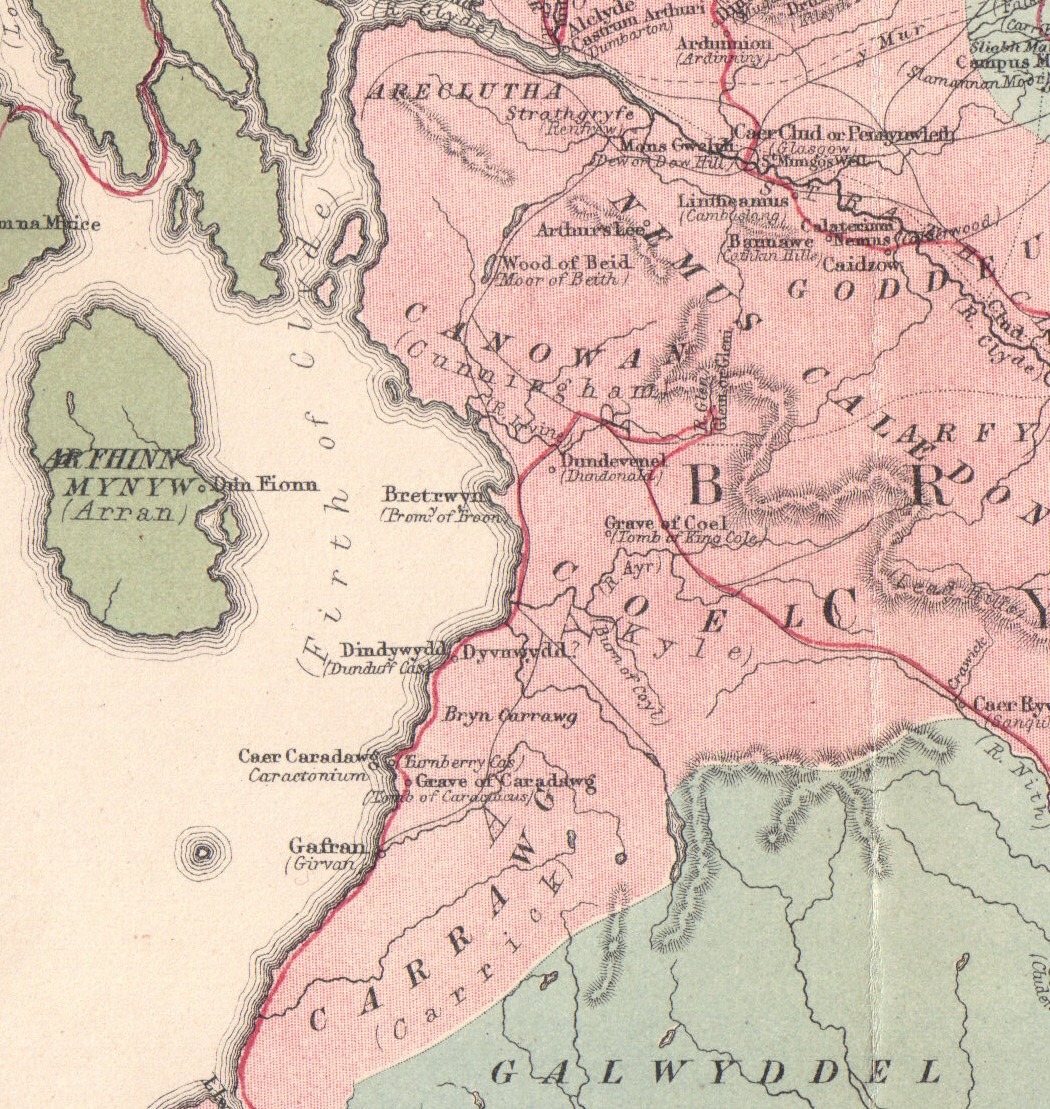
Arthurian locations showing Beith Moor

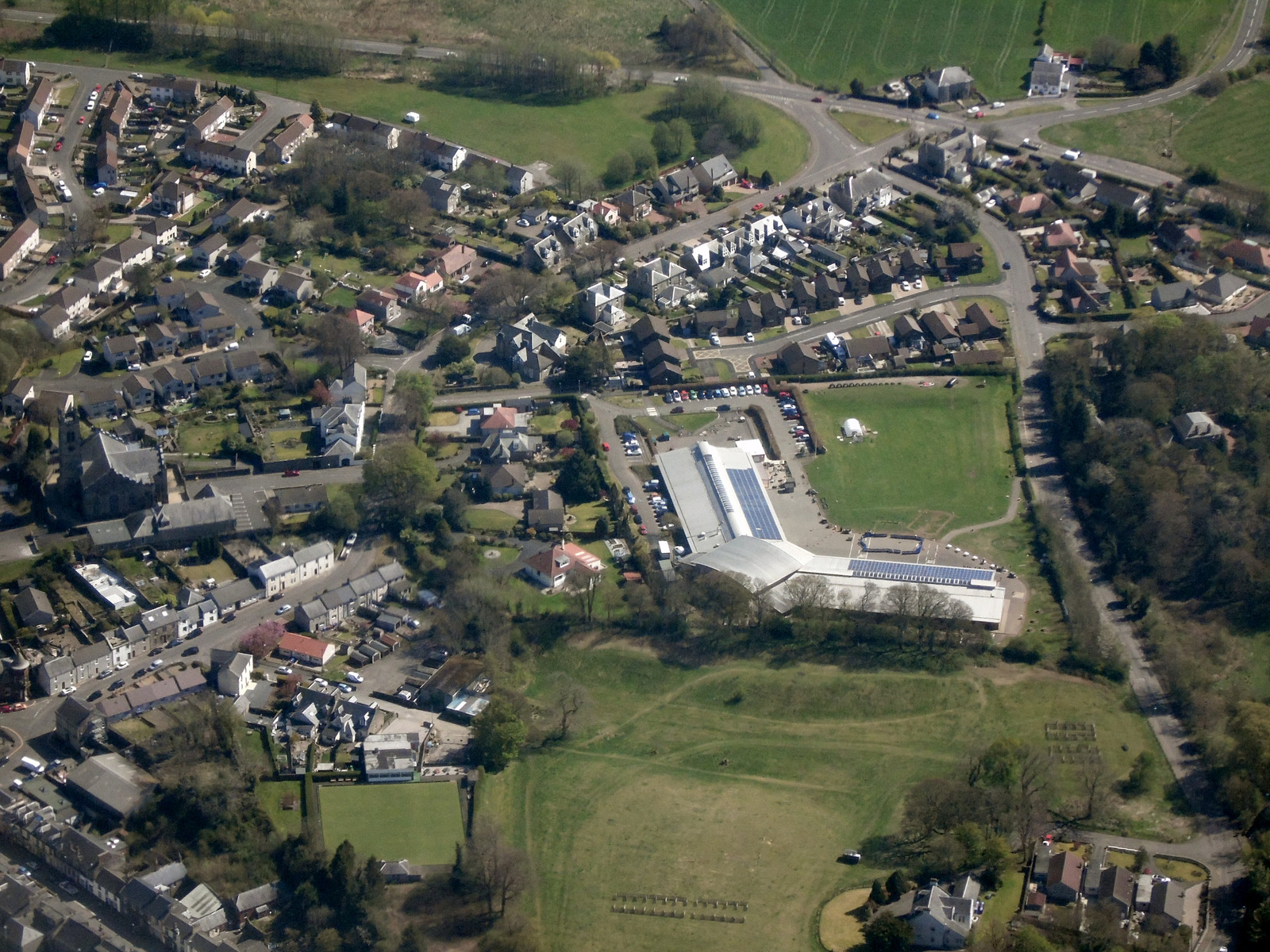
Aerial view from a commercial aircraft in April 2022

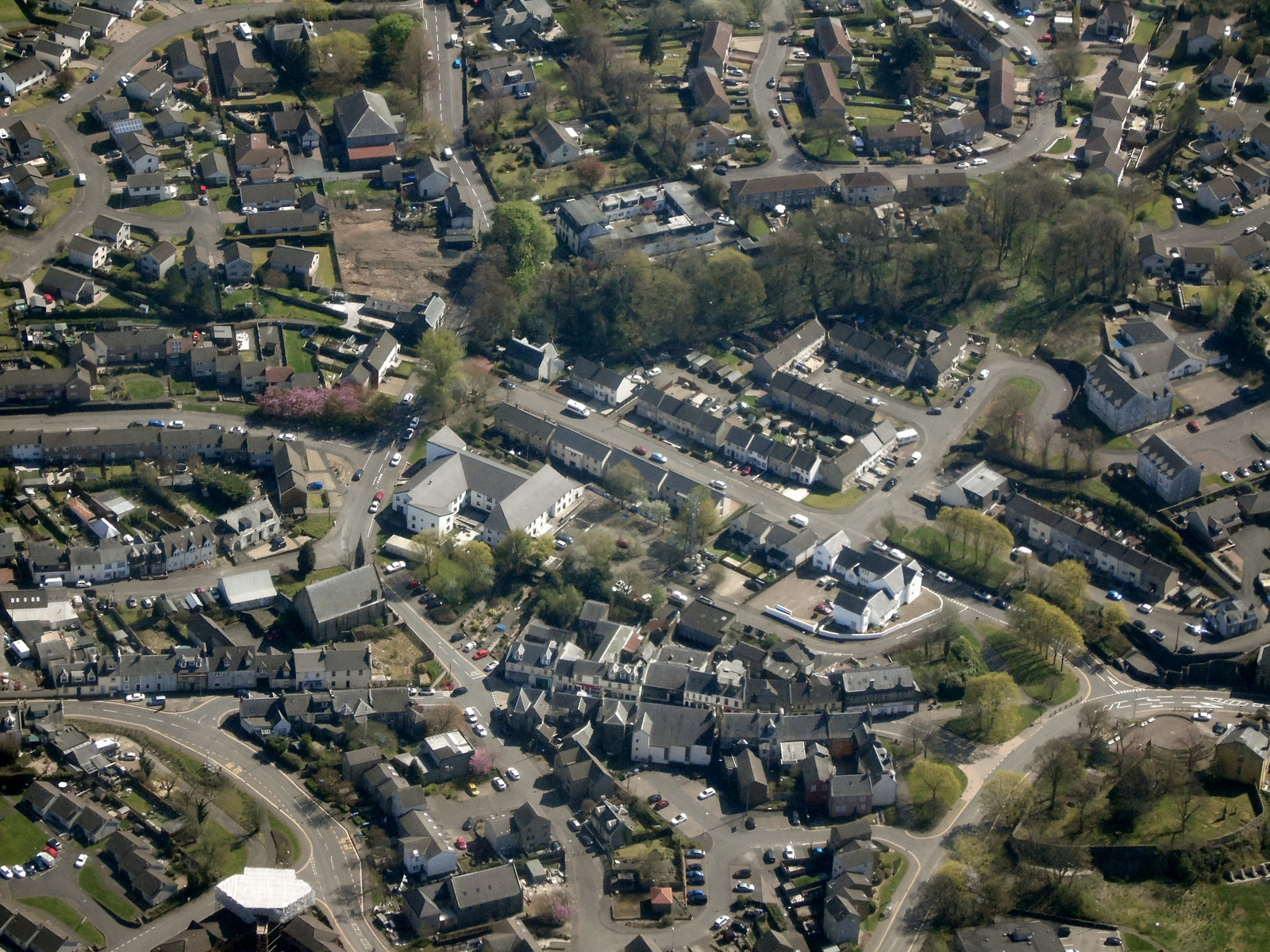
Aerial view from a commercial aircraft in April 2022

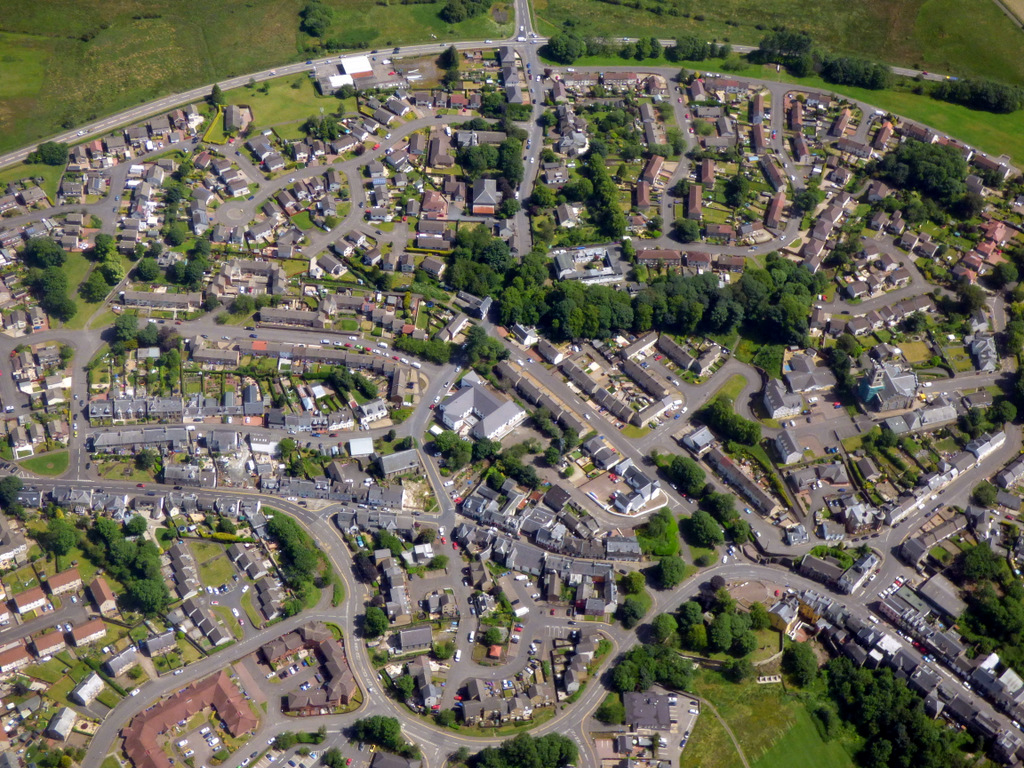
Aerial view from a commercial aircraft in June 2019

== See also ==
1. Beith Juniors
2. Hill of Beith Castle
3. Blae Loch, Beith
4. Broadstone, North Ayrshire
5. Giffen, Barony and Castle
6. Clark, Katy
7. Clarke, Steve
8. Corrie, John
9. Faulds, Henry
10. Gateside, North Ayrshire
11. Gibson, Kenny
12. Hessilhead
13. Inan, Saint
14. Kilbirnie Loch
15. Lands of Threepwood
16. Lambie, David
17. Montgomerie, Alexander
18. Nevill, Ted
19. Spier's school
20. Wilson, Allan
21. Wilson, Brian
22. Witherspoon, John
23. Murder of James Young
