= Stevenson and Higgins =

Stevenson, Higgins and Company (also Janefield Cabinet and Chair Works) was a cabinet works firm in Beith, Scotland.

It was founded by Hugh Stevenson, William Stevenson and Hugh Higgins in 1883.
