= Robert Aitken's new Parish Atlas of Ayrshire. 1829. =

Robert Aitken
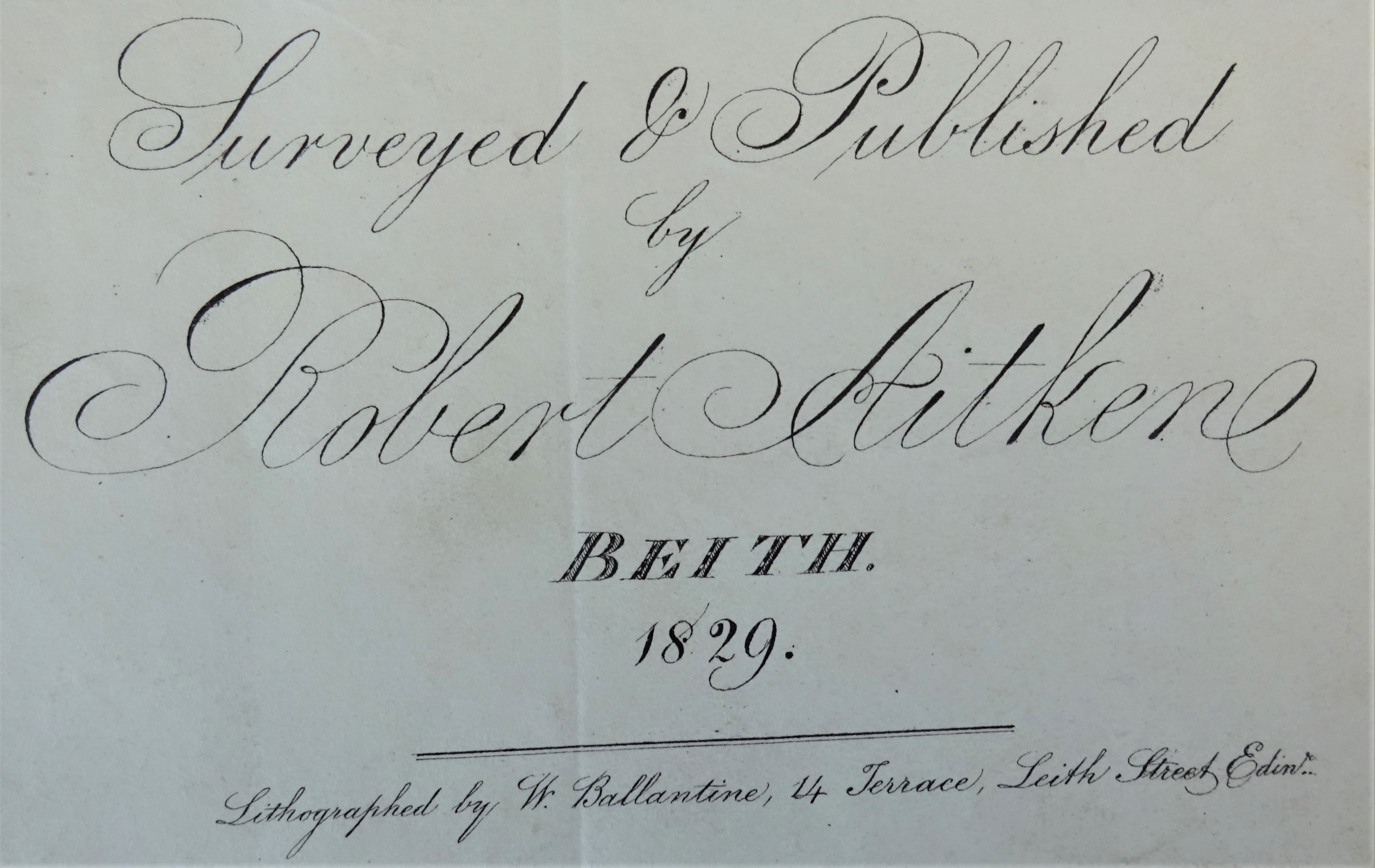
- Robert Aitken, Cartographer
- Born: Circa 1786; Ayrshire
- Occupation(s): Land Surveyor & Cartographer

Robert Aitken was a Land Surveyor and a Cartographer who was born in Ayrshire circa 1786. In 1829 he surveyed and published "A new Parish Atlas of Ayrshire, Part 1, Cuninghame District" in Beith, North Ayrshire.

== The new Parish atlas of Ayrshire and other maps ==
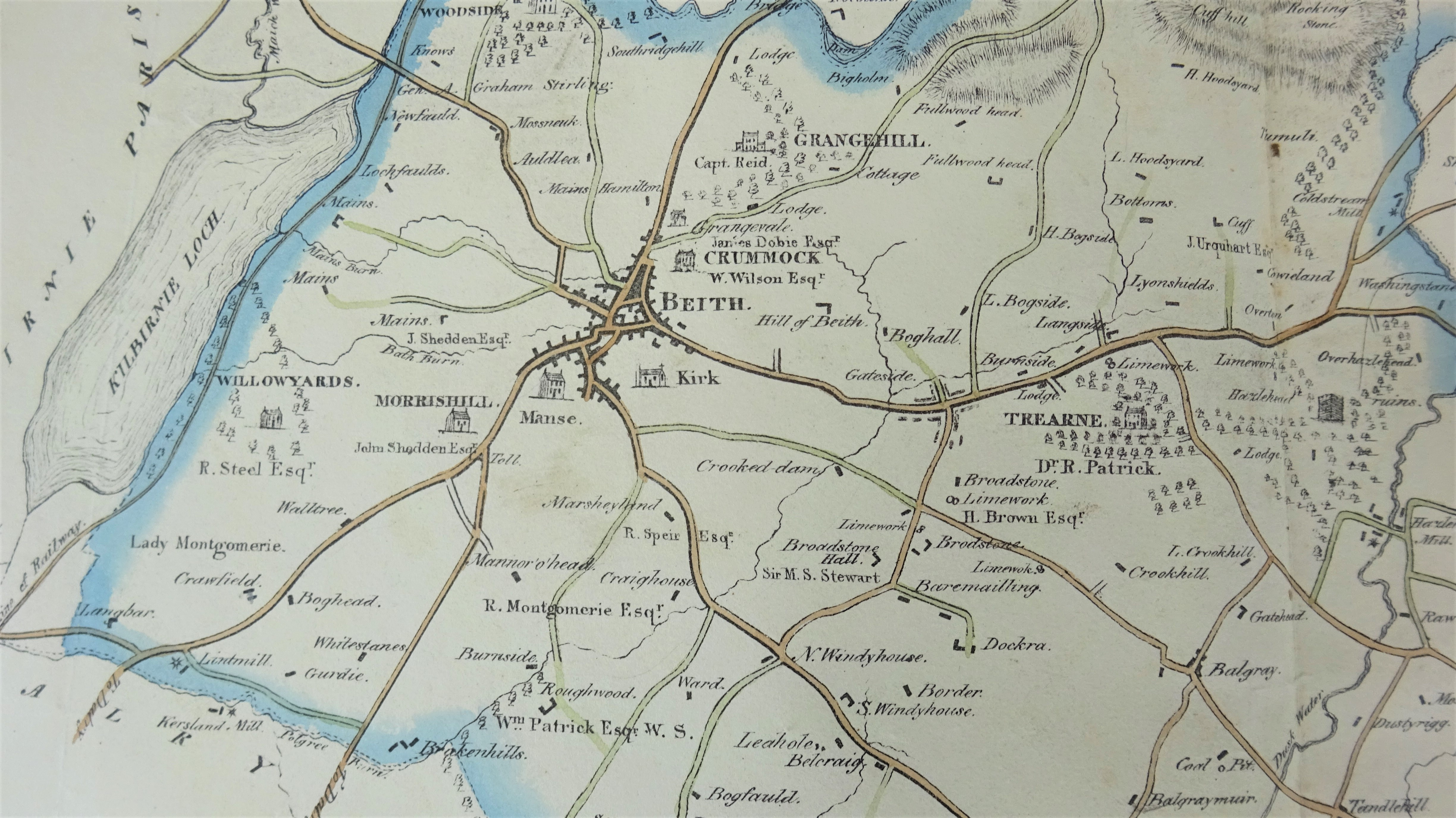
Robert Aitken's map of Beith

The 'proposal' for potential subscribers at the beginning of the work gives information of the layout of the atlas, together with the detail that: "Each map will contain the names of every House within the Parish - the whole Roads, Turnpike, Parochial, and Private - and the Rivers and Streams. Each Map will contain the names of the principal Heritors, and sundry Statistical and Historical Notices".

Aitken was successful in his attempt to attract sufficient subscribers, 86 being listed; he had stated that he needed 100 in the 1827 'proposal'. The list of subscribers is impressive in its coverage of the artistocracy and significant land owners in Ayrshire suggesting a degree of co-operation indicating close contacts within the landowners of Ayrshire. The titled subscribers and those with high military ranks are listed separately. From 1829 he started to publish the present work in Beith with surveys of all 16 parishes, on a scale of 2 inches to 1 statute mile. The atlas is dedicated to Archibald William Montgomerie, 13th Earl of Eglinton, 1st Earl of Winton (1812–1861), and contains a detailed distance table of towns within the county. The publication was a folio of 14 maps, surveyed by Robert Aitken and W. Ballantine of 14 Terrace, Leith Street, Edinburgh was the lithographer for all the parish maps. It is not recorded how many atlases were printed, however 86 subscribers are listed.

One copy bears the unusual bookplate of a fellow contemporary land surveyor, Andrew Crawford of Dalry, a gentleman of some standing, who was the chairman of Dalry Burns club from 1828 to 1843. He is not listed amongst the subscribers.

Aitken is also known to have published a plan of Cowieland for John Richmond in 1837. A Cowieland is recorded as part of the Lands of Cuff near Beith in Scotland's Places and on John Thomson's 1832 map.

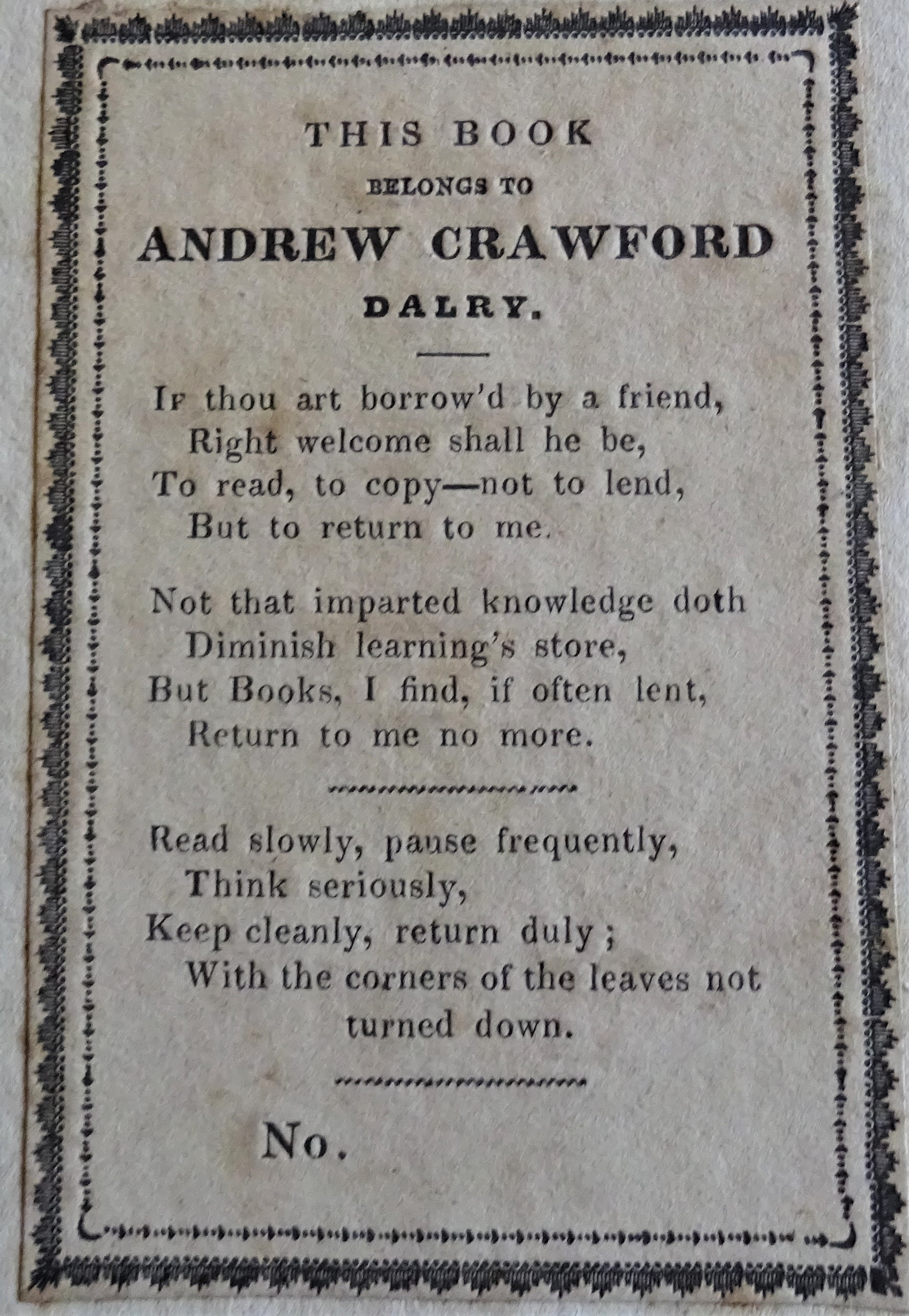
Bookplate by Andrew Crawford, Land Surveyor, Dalry, 1829.

The maps are rare and an atlas, minus the Cuninghamia map, in 2016 was auctioned by Lyon & Turnbull for £550. The original price on the proposals sheet was 2/6s per sheet for those who subscribed for the whole and 5s for partial subscribers to parishes, to be paid on delivery.

By 1827 Aitken had completed his survey of the Parish of Beith and the response was that it "had met with the approbation of Gentlemen of Scientific knowledge and taste;" who had encouraged him to cover the other Cuninghame parishes. He had plans for surveying Kyle and Carrick depended upon the success of the Cuninghame atlas but they never came to fruition.

The demand for Aitken's map would have been in question given that John Thomson's 1 1/4 mile = 1 inch map of the "Northern Part of Ayrshire." was issued as part of his Atlas of Scotland, published in Edinburgh : J. Thomson & Co., 1828. 1 map on 4 sheets; 1302 x 984 mm., sheets 690 x 513 mm.

=== The supplementary information ===
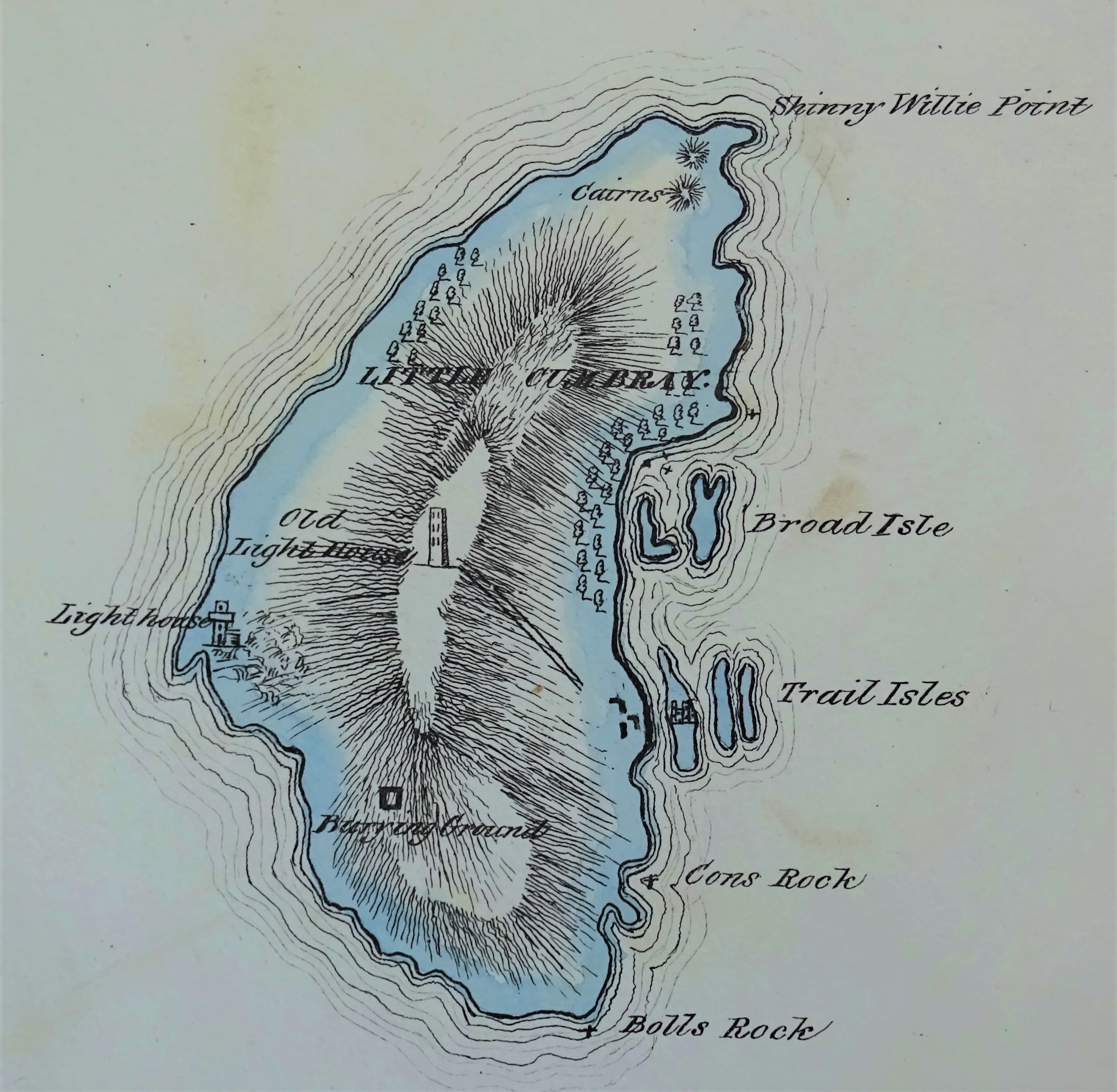
Robert Aitken's map of Little Cumbrae.

In the 1827 'proposal' document Aitken had promised subscribers that the maps would also carry information such as the names of every house within the Parishes, whole Roads, Turnpike, Parochial, and Private; names of the Rivers and Streams; names of the principal Heritors, and "sundry Statistical and Historical Notices." These 'sundry statistics' included the populations of the parishes in 1755, 1791, 1801, 1811 and 1821; the total rental value in pounds Scots of the parish or major towns; the surface area in square miles; sometimes the latitude and longitude of major towns; sometimes the extent in miles of parish roads and turnpikes with toll houses marked and named as such; a colour key to the roads is sometimes given; the maps have a scale in miles and furlongs at the bottom of the page. The extent of moorland and green pasture is sometimes shown; height of the principal hills and some significant buildings is shown; ruins are marked as such and even tumuli indicated. The surface area of Kilbirnie Loch is recorded as its old name 'Loch Thankart'. The number of lint, corn and wool mills in a parish is listed on occasions.

The maps are carefully hand coloured on wove paper with parish boundaries highlighted as are the turnpikes. Maps north, south, east and west directions are indicated using different styles of compasses. A double page table of distances was included.

=== The parish atlas map details ===
(1) Map of Ayrshire. D.Macdonald, sc. 171 x 133mm. 1830.

(2) Cuninghamia by Timotheo Pont. 419 x 546mm. Engraved 1837.

(3) Map of Cuninghame. 394 x 514mm. W.Ballantine, litho. 1830.

(4) Map of the Parishes of Ardrossan, Stevenston and Kilwinning. 406 x 514mm. 1m = 2 ins. 1828, litho 1829.

(5) Map of the Parish of Beith. 368 x 489mm. c.1m = 2 ins. Surveyed 1827, litho 1828.

(6) Map of the Parish of Dalry. 521 x 406mm. c.1m = 2 ins. Surveyed 1827.

(7) Map of the Parishes of Irvine, Dreghorn and Kilmaurs. 381 x 495mm. 1m = 2 ins. Surveyed & litho 1829.

(8) Map of the Parishes of Stewarton and Dunlop. 425 x 508mm. 1m = 2 ins. Surveyed & litho 1829.

(9) Map of the Parish of Fenwick. 381 x 502mm. 1m = 2 ins. Surveyed & litho 1829.

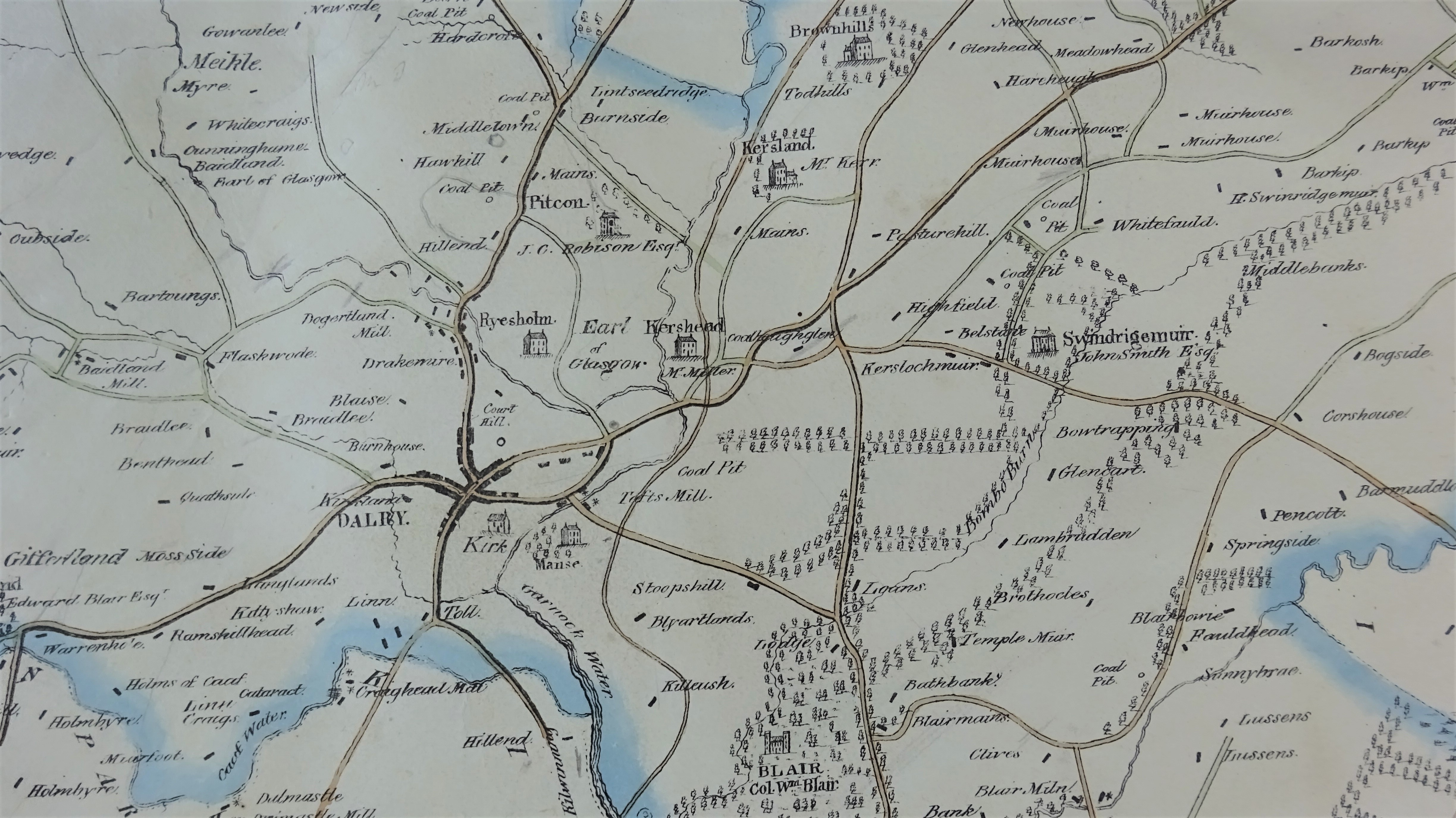
Robert Aitkens map of the Parish of Dalry.

(10) Map of the Parish of Kilbirnie. 502 x 375mm. 1m = 2 ins. Surveyed 1827; litho 1828.

(11) Map of the Parish of Kilbride. 387 x 508mm. 1m = 2 ins. Surveyed 1827; litho 1829.

(12) Maps of the Environs of Kilmarnock. 387 x 502mm. 1m = 2 ins. Surveyed 1828; litho 1829.

(13) Maps of the Parish of Largs. 527 x 394mm. 1m = 2 ins. Surveyed 1827.

(14) Map of the Parish of Loudoun. 387 x 521mm. 1m = 2 ins. Surveyed & litho 1829.

== Life and family ==
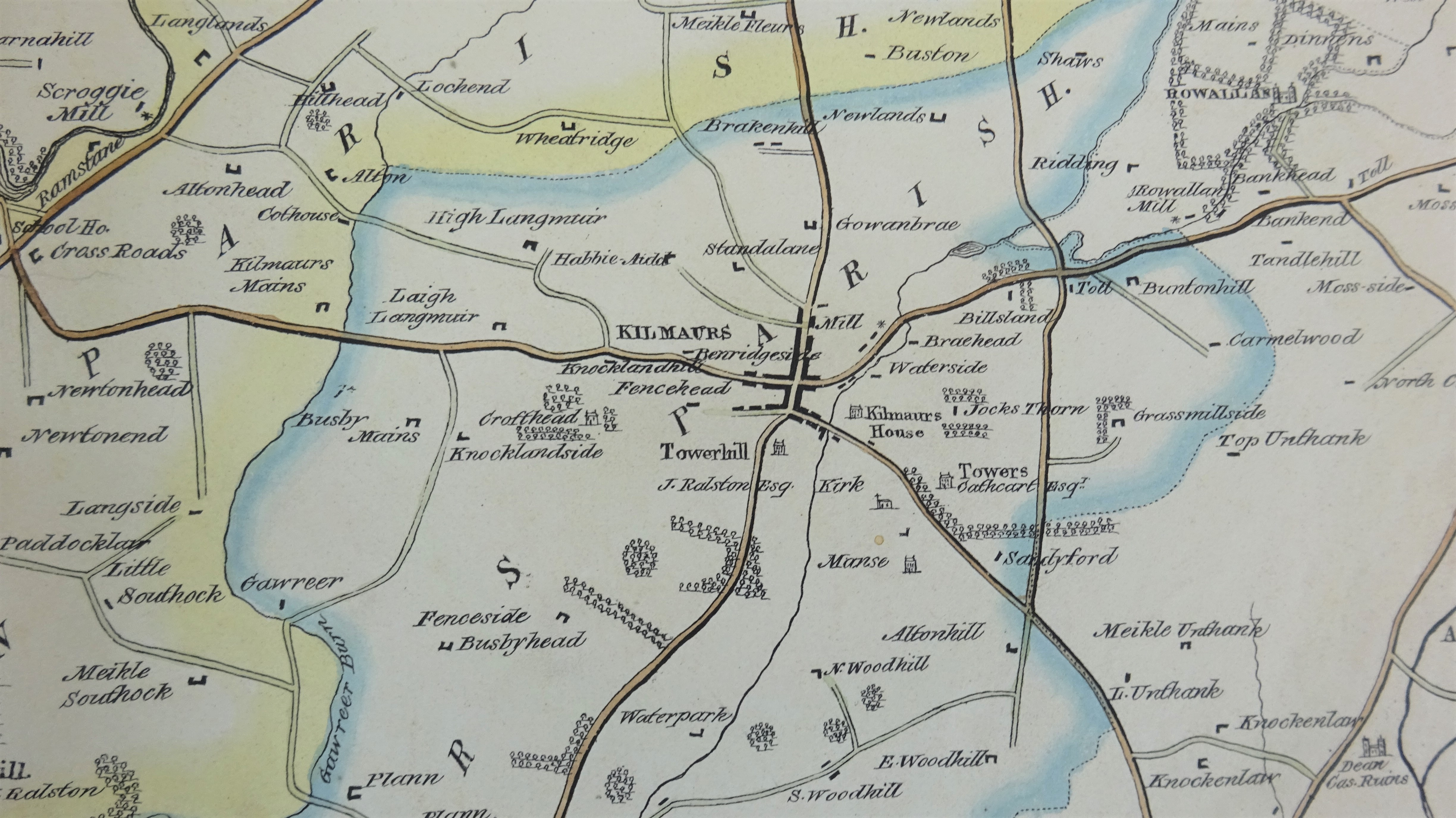
Robert Aitken's map of Kilmaurs

Robert Aitken was recorded as a Land Surveyor in the 1841 Census and that shows that he was 55 years of age at the time, living at 35 New Street, Beith with his wife Mary, a flax throwster, aged 50 and a daughter Elizabeth, aged six. A flax throwster was a textile worker on a machine which twisted together strands of flax into linen yarn. The family are not listed at Beith on the 1851 Census.

Little is known of his time in Beith, but he was a member of the Beith Benficent Society.

== See also ==
- Lambroughton
