= Beith Parish Churches =

Union of Beith High Church and Beith Trinity Church

Beith Parish Church
- Beith Parish Church
- High:55°44′58″N 4°37′53.5″W; Trinity:55°45′15″N 4°37′44.5″W
- Denomination: Church of Scotland
- Website: Beith Parish Churches

Administration
- Parish: Beith

Beith Parish Church was formed from the Union of Beith High Church and Beith Trinity Church. Services are held in the former High Church building in Kirk Road

The Beith High Church was built in 1807 and extended in 1885. Gothic T-plan kirk dominated by the tall five-stage tower. Stained glass by Gordon Webster. Harrison & Harrison pipe organ 1885. The High Church is a category B listed building.

The Beith Trinity Church was built in 1883, designed by architect Robert Baldie. The chief external feature is a graceful octagonal tower. Interior destroyed by fire 1917, rebuilt 1926. Gothic style, with rectangular nave, Gothic arched chancel and one transept on the east side. Stained glass by John C Hall & Co. Organ 1937 by Hill, Norman & Beard. Trinity Church is a category C listed building.

The archives of Beith Church are maintained by the Archives of the University of Glasgow (GUAS).

In November 2023, a noise complaint against the modern electric church bell resulted in the bells being silenced during nighttime hours.
