= Donna Kossy =

American writer

- Born: Donna Jean Kossy
- Citizenship: United States
- Occupations: Writer, folklorist
- Writing career
- Period: since 1984 (zine) since 1994 (book)
- Subjects: weird ideas and beliefs, "kooks", pseudoscience, fringe science, conspiracy theory, UFO, obscure books
- Notable works: Kooks (1994); Strange Creations (2001)

Donna J. Kossy is an American writer, zine publisher, and online used book dealer based in Portland, Oregon. Specializing in the history of "forgotten, discredited and extreme ideas", which she calls "crackpotology and kookology", she is better known for her books Kooks: A Guide to the Outer Limits of Human Belief (1994, featuring the first biography of Francis E. Dec) and Strange Creations: Aberrant Ideas of Human Origins from Ancient Astronauts to Aquatic Apes (2001). Kossy was also the founder and curator of the Kooks Museum (1996–1999, online), and the editor-publisher of the magazine Book Happy (1997–2002, about "weird and obscure books").

Described by Wired as "an expert on kooks [who] has a genuine, if sometimes uncomfortable, affection for her subjects", Kossy wrote books reviewed in publications ranging from Fortean Times to New Scientist. Journalist Jonathan Vankin named her "the unchallenged authority on, well, kooks", and writer Bruce Sterling noted that she "boldly blazes new trails in the vast intellectual wilderness of American writers, thinkers and philosophers who were or are completely nuts".

== Life ==
=== Early life ===
Donna Jean Kossy started doing zines in sixth grade, co-editing Kid Stuff with a friend: "It had gossip, fashions, poetry, jokes and even movie reviews. It sold for 5 cents. My mom typed it up and Xeroxed it at work!" Kossy attended Evanston Township High School. After graduating college in 1979, she became involved in punk culture via collage art, color xerox postcards and mail art.

Kossy eventually became a computer programmer, but also published zines because "Publishing is power, pure and simple", and turned "author and folklorist."

=== Adult life ===
At one time, Kossy was the housemate of fellow zine maker Pagan Kennedy. She attuned Chicago writer Dan Kelly to cult "kook" Francis E. Dec. In the early 1980s, she was part of the Processed World (PW) magazine, then romantically involved with anti-PW and ex-SubGenius anarchist Bob Black until 1987, moving with him to Boston in 1985.

In 1989, research for her Kooks Magazine led Kossy to abandon much of her other work. On August 17, 1993, she married Kenneth James DeVries in Multnomah County, Oregon. Ken DeVries (a.k.a. Orton Nenslo), also a member of the Church of the SubGenius and contributor to their books, provided some illustrations for her books and some articles for her website.

== Works ==
=== False Positive (1984–1988) ===
In 1984, Kossy started publishing False Positive (1984–1988), a Xeroxed zine which ran for eleven issues. Each issue focused on one topic (such as technology, sex, Japan, cars, crime, kooks, food & drugs) and featured related book excerpts, satire, collages, drawings, etc.

The zine and Kossy were quoted by Discordianism co-founder Kerry Thornley (alias Omar Khayyam Ravenhurst) in his 1991 foreword to the 5th edition of the Principia Discordia, reprinting the "Manifesto of the Artistic Elite of the Midwest". Kossy said that her "career as a crackpotologist" started there with the "Kooks Pages" within each issue and the two special all-kooks issues.

=== Kooks Magazine (1988–1991) ===
In 1988, Kossy started publishing Kooks Magazine (1988–1991), now using offset printing and running for eight issues. A spinoff of the kooks pages of her zine, it was in line with the 1988 book High Weirdness by Mail by SubGenius co-founder Rev. Ivan Stang (who later praised the collected book) and featured obscure "kooks" as well as some better-documented "cranks" such as reclusive Spider-Man co-creator Steve Ditko in its final issue (#8, November 1991).

In Factsheet Five, the zine magazine, founder-editor Mike Gunderloy described it as "A collection of bizarre literature and semi-scholarly research on kooks: those folks who have all the answers that science and the authorities have been trying to suppress. This issue features [...] progress towards a theory of kookdom." then reported one year later that it "keeps getting better; you can spend hours lost in the worldviews here." SubGenius and writer Richard Kadrey described it as "indispensable for anyone interested in the real bleeding edge of thought." Research for the topic even led Kossy to attend a recruitment meeting of Heaven's Gate (when it was calling itself Human Individual Metamorphosis), the group that ended in a 1997 mass suicide.

=== Kooks (1994) ===
In 1994, Feral House published Kossy's first book, Kooks: A Guide to the Outer Limits of Human Belief, an anthology containing updated articles from her zine along with articles written exclusively for the book, with the cover illustration painted by her husband. Organized into seven parts (Religion, Science, Metaphysics, Politics, Conspiracy, Enigmas; plus Outtakes in the 2nd ed.), it documented the rants and ravings of "kooks" such as Richard Brothers (Anglo-Israelism alias British Israelism), Charles E. Buon (God's Envoy to the U.S.A.), Ray Crabtree (The Philosopher King), the first biography of Francis E. Dec (Your Only Hope against the Gangster Computer God), Professor Arnold Ehret (Mucusless Diet Healing System), Joe Gould alias Professor Seagull (The Longest Book Ever Written), Jim and Lila Green (Aggressive Christianity Missionary Training Corps), Hillman Holcomb (Well Regulated Militia of Christian Technocracy), Les U. Knight (Voluntary Human Extinction Movement), alien abductee artist Paul Laffoley (Third Generation Lunatic Fringe), Alfred Lawson (Lawsonomy: The Base for Absolute Knowledge), David Linton (How Men Can Have Babies), Emil Matalik (World/U.S. Presidential Candidate Since 1964), the MIT's crank files (The Archive of Useless Research), Rose Mokry (Jewish Poisoners Are the Sole Producers of All the Diseases, Sudden Deaths and Birth Defects), Dr. Cyrus Teed (not Cyrus Tweed) alias Koresh (Koreshanity: We Actually Live on the Inside of the Earth), black supremacist Dwight York alias Malachi Z. York et al. (Ansaaru Allah Community of Nuwaubianism), etc.

The book was praised as "a rich compendium of looniness" by the Los Angeles Times, "indispensable for anyone interested in the real cutting edge of thought" by the San Francisco Chronicle, and a "delight" by Fortean Times. In Factsheet Five, the new editor R. Seth Friedman recommended it with, "I've been anxiously awaiting this book ever since Donna Kossy told me about her plans several years ago. [...] Don't miss out on this book." Jay Kinney, publisher of Gnosis Magazine, found it "Compulsively readable. The 'kooks' collected in this volume are our true American originals and Donna Kossy chronicles their jaw-dropping messages with a rare mix of objectivity, sympathy, and wit." And a 1995 Wired review described Kossy as "an expert on kooks [who] has a genuine, if sometimes uncomfortable, affection for her subjects."

=== Kooks Outtakes (1995) ===
In 1995, Kooks Outtakes followed its namesake, being a 36-page supplement of material Kossy had left out for reasons of space; it was later merged with the second edition of the book in 2001, which the editor of Ink 19 praised, noting that "Kossy's style is direct and surprisingly unjudgemental. [...] Kossy is quite systematic in her research, and margin comments abound, along with a lush bibliography. This is serious stuff."

=== Kooks Museum (1996–1999) ===
In 1996, Kossy founded and curated on her web site the Kooks Museum (an online summary and extension of her book Kooks, updated until mid-1999 when it was discontinued and kept as an archive), explaining: "As curator and founder of the first Kooks Museum in history I am fulfilling a half-life-long goal of housing kook ideas from all over the world under one crumbling roof. [...] The point of all this excess is neither to debunk nor to proselytize. Rather, my intent is to document and study the vast cornucopia of forgotten, discredited and extreme ideas, with all due consideration to social and cultural context. Nor do I think all ideas are equally valid. Rather, I try to be both open-minded to and skeptical of them."

The Museum was listed in the MetroActive guide to "the most interesting, unusual, weird or otherwise alternative sites on the World Wide Web" by journalist and writer on conspiracies Jonathan Vankin, who named Kossy "the unchallenged authority on, well, kooks."

=== Book Happy (1997–2002) ===
In 1997, Kossy started editing and publishing Book Happy (1997–2002), a printed magazine which ran for seven issues. Written by Kossy and others (recurrent contributors includes Greg Bishop, Ken DeVries, Dan Howland, Dan Kelly, John Marr, Chris Mikul, David C. Morrison, Chip Rowe, Brian Tucker, Robert Tucker), it was dedicated to reviewing "weird and obscure books".

The magazine was complemented by her web site (later becoming its domain name) and the formation of Book Happy Booksellers an online used book business specializing in unusual and hard-to-find items, with inventory listed on various book listing sites including Abebooks, Biblio, Alibris, Choosebooks and others. Book Happy was reviewed positively by English artist Mark Pawson (creator of Die-Cut Plug Wiring Diagram Book) in a 1999 review for the British cultural magazine Variant.

=== Strange Creations (2001) ===
In 2001, Feral House published Kossy's second full-length book, Strange Creations: Aberrant Ideas of Human Origins from Ancient Astronauts to Aquatic Apes (right after reprinting Kooks in an expanded edition). As of August 1998, Kossy had already announced the manuscript for her second book as being finished (with a tentative title balancing between "Aberrant Anthropology" and "Nazis, Saucers and Aquatic Apes") and its publication at Feral House scheduled for "Fall, 1999"; it would however be two more years before the actual release.

Organized into seven parts (Extraterrestrial Origins, De-evolution, Race, Eugenics, Creationism, The Aquatic Ape Theory, and Urantia/Szukalski/H.I.M.), the book documented the fringe and pseudoscientific theories of "crackpots" such as David Barclay (mankind as dinosaurs pets), Helena Blavatsky (The Seven Root Races of Theosophy), Darwin's cousin Francis Galton (inventor of eugenics against regression toward the mean), Henry H. Goddard (inventor of moronism with The Kallikak Family), Madison Grant (Nordicism and scientific racism), Finnvald Hedin (The Thorians), Brinsley Trench (UFOs from Hollow Earth), slave trader Edward Long (Polygenism: Man Comes From God, Negroes Come From Apes), Oscar Kiss Maerth (The Beginning Was the End: ape brain cannibalism), Alfred W. McCann (creationism), Elaine Morgan (aquatic ape hypothesis), Raël (creation by extraterrestrials), B. H. Shadduck (de-evolution), Zecharia Sitchin (ancient astronauts), Lothrop Stoddard (Pan-Aryanism and racial purity), Stanisław Szukalski (Zermatism: post-deluge Easter Island vs. Yetis), the Urantia Book (intelligent design by Life Carriers), George Van Tassel (Space Brothers aliens), Erich von Däniken (Ancient Astronauts from the Chariots of the Gods?), etc.

The book was praised from Fortean Times to Booklist and from the Washington City Paper to Counterpoise. In a mixed review, the New Scientist noted that "Donna Kossy's Strange Creatures [sic!] is about people who have spent rather more time on these problems than most, visiting some of the weirder reaches of the human imagination". And Rev. Ivan Stang remarked: "To write entertainingly for 'nonkooks' about so-called kooks, crackpots, and possible visionaries requires walking a tightrope between tolerant understanding of 'outsider' psychology and graceful sarcasm, balancing both a solid grounding in the mainstream scientific paradigm, and a healthy distrust of the status quo."

Science-fiction writer Bruce Sterling, who also touched upon online cranks in his essay "Electronic Text", commented that "Donna Kossy boldly blazes new trails in the vast intellectual wilderness of American writers, thinkers, and philosophers who were or are completely nuts. Kooks ranks with such sociological classics as Mackay's Extraordinary Popular Delusions and Dudley's Mathematical Cranks. This, for obvious reasons, is a book which every science fiction writer should possess." In her own words, Kossy has stated, "I seek not to debunk strange ideas, but to present them as a necessary segment of the full spectrum of human thought."

Kossy is currently focused on her bookselling business and from November 2007 to September 2008 wrote a blog, "The Cutthroat World of Book Scouting" (http://bookhappy.easyjournal.com ), which chronicled her experiences in the book trade.

== Publications ==
=== Magazines ===
- 1984–1988: False Positive #1–11 (a.k.a. False Positive Magazine)
  #1 (1984), #2–4 (1985), #5–8 (1986), #9 (1987), #10–11 (1988). Allston, MA (Boston, MA for #1): Out-of-Kontrol Data Korporation, no ISSN (OCLC 61886364). 8½" × 11", Xeroxed zine, about 20–52 p., was $3.
- 1988–1991: Kooks Magazine #1–8 (alias The Original Donna Kossy's Kooks Magazine for #1–4)
  #1 (1988), #2–4 (1989), #5–6 (1990), #7–8 (1991). Allston, MA: Out-of-Kontrol Data Institute, ISSN 1045-103X (OCLC 21343961). 8½" × 11", offset magazine (except #1, 5½" × 8½", Xeroxed), 20–40 p., was $3–$5. – The OCLC's start date is incorrect.
- 1997–2002: Book Happy #1–7 (a.k.a. Book Happy Magazine)
  #1 (1997), #2–3 (1998), #4 (1999), #5 (2000), #6 (2001), #7 (2002). By Donna Kossy (ed., reviews) & various (reviews); Portland, OR: Book Happy, no ISSN (OCLC 39752380). 8½" × 11", offset magazine, total 232 p., was $6.

=== Books ===
- 1994: Kooks: A Guide to the Outer Limits of Human Belief
  Portland, OR: Feral House. ISBN 0-922915-19-9 (1st ed. pbk., 254 p., May 1994, LCCN 96-195497) and ISBN 0-922915-20-2 (1st ed. hbk., 254 p., May 1994). Reissued by Los Angeles: Feral House, ISBN 978-0-922915-67-5 (2nd exp. ed. pbk., 287 p., May 2001) — Collects material from her Kooks Magazine. The 2nd ed. was expanded with 1995's Kooks Outtakes.
- 1995: Kooks Outtakes [supplement]
  8½" × 11", 36 p. – Material cut from Kooks due to space, later added to its 2nd edition.
- 1996: The Kooks Museum [online]
  Web site (OCLC 77656278), updated 1996–1999 (archived mid-1999), formerly at www.teleport.com/~dkossy, now at https://web.archive.org/web/20080215015348/http://www.pacifier.com/~dkossy/kooksmus.html — Updated summary and extension of Kooks.
- 2001: Strange Creations: Aberrant Ideas of Human Origins from Ancient Astronauts to Aquatic Apes
  Los Angeles: Feral House. ISBN 978-0-922915-65-1 (1st ed. pbk., 264 (x, 253) p., June 2001).

== See also ==
Similar books

- Extraordinary Popular Delusions (1841), Charles Mackay's debunking of popular folly
- Fads and Fallacies in the Name of Science (1957), Martin Gardner's scientific skepticism
- Mathematical Cranks (1992) and The Trisectors (1996), Underwood Dudley's crank math books
