= Pseudo-scholarship =

Pretended but not actual scholarship

Pseudo-scholarship (from pseudo- and scholarship) is a term used to describe work (e.g., a publication or lecture) or a body of work that is presented as, but is not, the product of rigorous and objective study or research; the act of producing such work; or the pretended learning upon which it is based.

Examples of pseudo-scholarship include:

- Pseudoarchaeology
- Pseudohistory
- Pseudolaw
- Pseudolinguistics
- Pseudomathematics
- Pseudophilosophy
- Pseudoscience

== See also ==
- Chaos magic
- Conspiracy theory
- Counterknowledge
- Crackpot index
- Crank (definition on Wiktionary)
- Fallacy
- Fringe science
- Fringe theory
- Irrelevant conclusion (Ignoratio elenchi)
- Junk science
- Mathematical Cranks
- Predatory journal
- Proto-science
