= False Positive (disambiguation) =

False Positive may refer to:

- False positive error, a result that incorrectly shows that a condition has been fulfilled
  - False positive rate, the frequency or likelihood of a false positive error
- "False Positive" (How I Met Your Mother), an episode of the US sitcom How I Met Your Mother
- False Positive, a magazine published by Donna Kossy
- False Positive (film), an American horror film
- False Positive (TV series), a Philippine drama television series

== See also ==
- "False positives" scandal, a series of murders in Colombia
