= Lorna J Waite =

Scottish academic, community activist and poet

Lorna J. Waite
- Born: 27 August 1964; Kilwinning, Ayrshire
- Died: 12 August 2023 (aged 58)
- Education: MSc, PhD
- Alma mater: University of Edinburgh
- Occupations: Academic; Community activist; Poet
- Writing career
- Language: Scots and English

Lorna J. Waite, PhD (27 August 1964 - 12 August 2023), was a Scottish academic, community activist and poet who, like Robert Burns, also from Ayrshire, wrote in both English and Scots. She had an awareness of social justice from her childhood and wrote poetry about the impact of the closure of heavy industry on communities in the West of Scotland. Waite researched post-industrial folk memory in a Wingate scholarship (2002) and as her PhD thesis, and in a children's novel.

She was awarded a New Writer's Bursary by the Scottish Arts Council and a writer in residence placement at Hugh MacDiarmid's cottage at Brownsbank in the Scottish Borders (2011). Waite was a Jessie Kesson Fellow at Moniack Mhor (2012). Waite wrote about the Scots' love of football and about Gaelic culture, and was also an art critic involved with a number of publications including the radical magazine, Variant and participated in a wide range of art events in collaboration with artists and writers and local communities.

== Life and works ==
Born Lorna Janet Waite in Kilwinning, and brought up in Kilbirnie in the industrial area of Ayrshire, in the West of Scotland. She attended Garnock Academy, and studied French, German and Latin, as well as the local bard, Robert Burns, whose Scots narrative poem Tam O'Shanter, she recited well at school. At primary school, she visited New York, and was impressed by the United Nations building, and the idea of world peace, which later prompted her to join the campaign for nuclear disarmament (CND), and being arrested for protesting at Faslane. She later advocated Scottish independence.

=== Social justice activism ===
Waite was the first of her family to attend university, studying psychology at Edinburgh University and undertook a MSc with distinction in community education. Her doctoral thesis, at Duncan Jordanstone College of Art was titled 'Cultural retrieval, land use and post-industrial folk memory: a practice-led response to the destruction of Glengarnock Steelworks'. Her children's novel Frances and The Blasties: Seven Steel Myths for Children was on this theme. Later she was to set up an art centre including people with special needs in Broxburn with ArtLink.

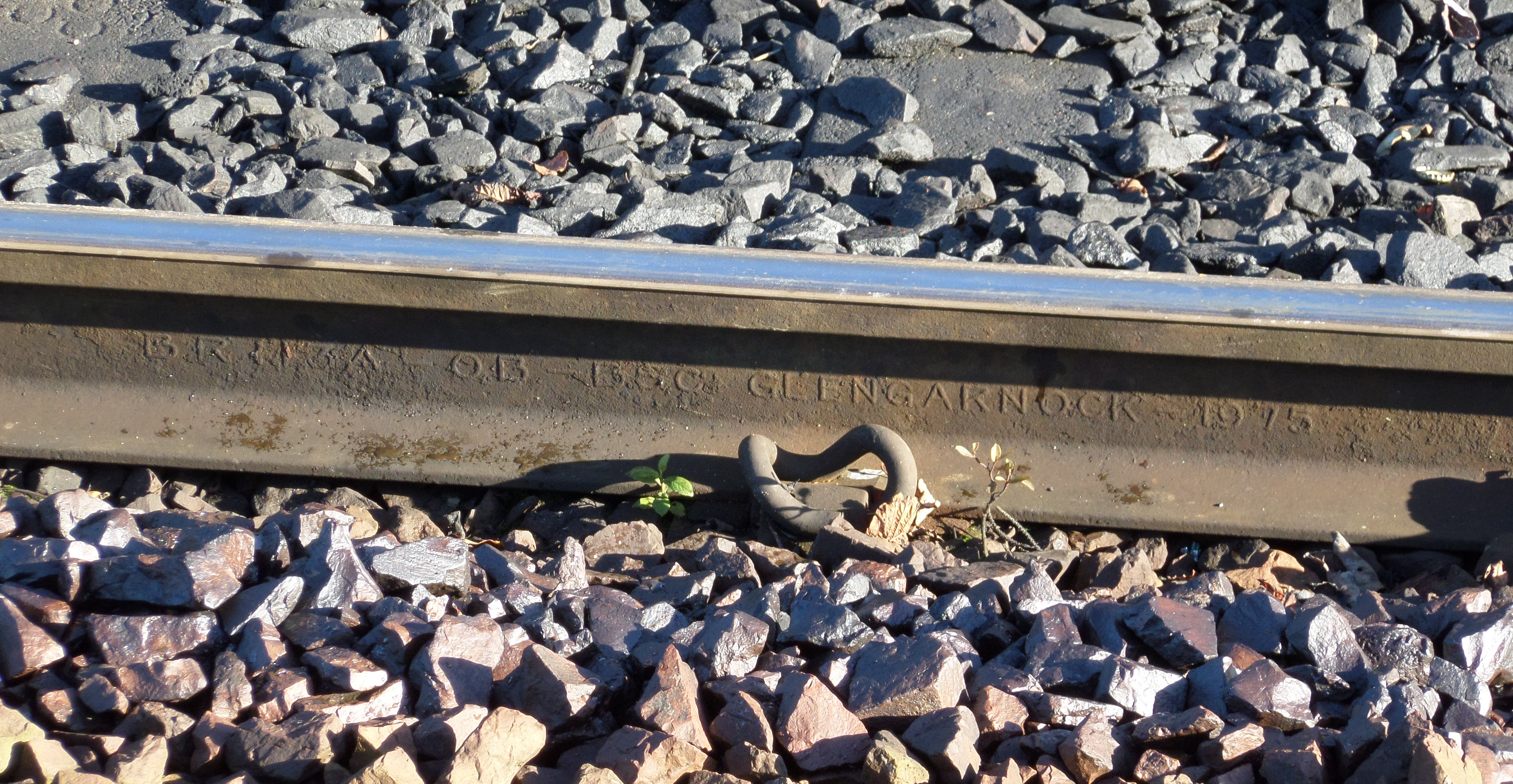
Glengarnocks Steelworks rail (1975)

When she was in her teens, the nearby Glengarnock Steelworks, which made railway tracks, among other things, and was a major employer since the nineteenth century was finally closed down in 1985.

The impact on the local communities around the steelworks as well as the deliberate destruction of archive materials relating to the work was core to her poetry, including 56 poems in her book 'Steel Garden Poems' (2011) Her poetry was described by Canadian poet Valerie Gillies: "in supple Scots Lorna Waite creates a way of holding hands with history, a workers’ history that needed her to write it down.”

=== Scottish football and politics ===
Waite was a member of the Tartan Army of fans who follow the Scottish football team, contributing to a book of poetry, edited by Alec Finlay, Football Haiku'. Her work appeared in the ''100 Favourite Scottish Football Poems', edited by Alasdair Findlay, who also included Waite's poem 'The Ravens O’ Thingvellir' in a book of poetry he edited with Tessa Ransford, around the Scottish Independence Referendum (2015). She reviewed the Radical Independence Conference as presenting the alternatives as 'fear and fear of fear'.

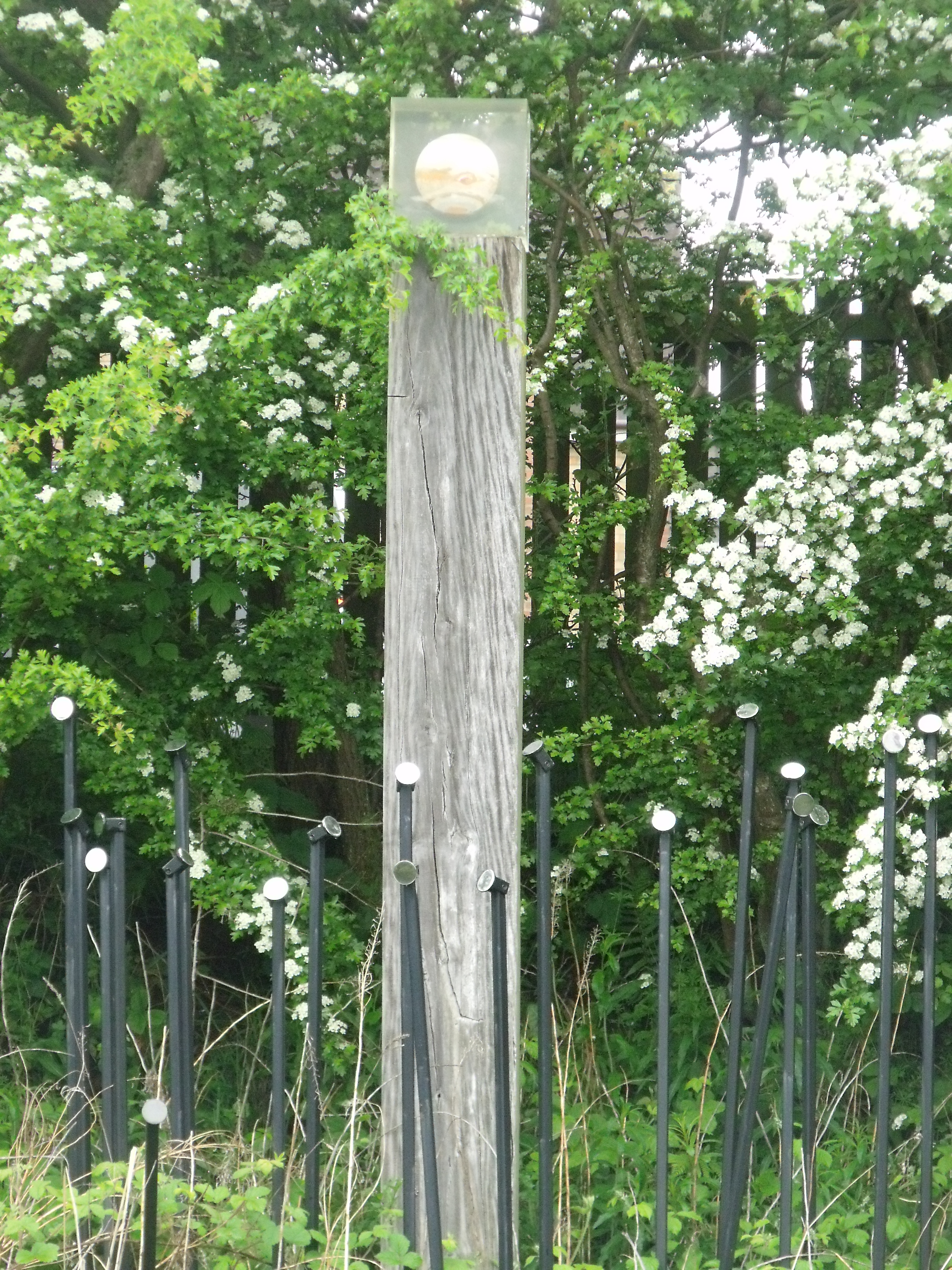
Kirkhill Pillar Project (Jupiter)

=== Art, poetry and Scottish culture ===
As an art critic, Waite wrote for Variant and collaborated with Richard Demarco, including writing about their cultural visit with 30 artists, writers and teachers to Poland, including a visit to Auschwitz She also worked with photographers Jo Spence and Maud Sulter, whose photography she had reviewed in 1996. Waite had a strong interest in preserving the natural world, and linked with Alastair McIntosh and Vérène Nicholas at the Centre for Human Ecology.

Another collaboration was in 2004, with Donald Urquhart, following her interest in astronomy, in making a model of the Solar System in the landscape of West Lothian, following the eighteenth century work (the Kirkhill Pillar), by the Earl of Buchan, who founded the Society of Antiquaries. Waite presented her work to the society, titled To remain worthy of the land: the Earl of Buchan, the Kirkhill Pillar Project and the re-animation of Scottish cultural history.

She was learning Gaelic and edited, 'Sealladh Às Ùr Air Ealain Na Gàidhelt Achd: Rethinking Highland Art which followed up an exhibition Uinneag dhan Àird an Iar: Ath-Lorg Ealain na Gàidhealtachd / Window to the West: The Rediscovery of Highland Art, at the Edinburgh City Art Centre (2011), and she often visited the Highlands on holidays and in her last days.

On 21 October 2020, Waite was a key speakerat the virtual Scottish Transport & Industry Collections Knowledge Network (STICK) conference on the topic Cultural Retrieval: land use and postindustrial folk memory.

In 2023, she wrote a poem in Scots on the Gaelic dictionary maker, Edward Dwelly, which was translated into Gaelic by Marcas Mac an Tuairnair (editor) and included in 'Cruinneachadh: A Gathering', a

Gerda Stevenson said of Waite:

"Lorna was luminous, powerful, brave yet humble, with a touching vulnerability. A remarkable woman, whose being somehow embodied the cultural strata of this richly diverse small nation we inhabit, and whose work we should all know about."

Lorna J. Waite died of cancer at home in Edinburgh on 12 August 2023, and is survived by her husband, Professor Emeritus Murdo Macdonald.

== Selected works ==
- Cultural retrieval, land use and post-industrial folk memory: a practice-led response to the destruction of Glengarnock Steelworks (doctoral thesis)
- contribution to 'Football Haiku' (2002), compiled by Alec Finlay (ed). ISBN 978-0-7486-6309-5
- lecture, 'To remain worthy of the land: the Earl of Buchan, the Kirkhill Pillar Project and the re-animation of Scottish cultural history', (2004) The Society of Antiquaries
- Frances and The Blasties: Seven Steel Myths for Children (children's novel)
- poem in '100 Favourite Scottish Football Poems' (2007), Alasdair Finlay (ed). ISBN 978-1-906307-03-5
- Steel Garden Poems (2011). ISBN 978-0-9566283-4-3
- poem,The Ravens O’ Thingvellir' in Nova Scotia:Poems for the Early Days of a Better Nation (2015), Tessa Ransford, Alasdair Findlay (eds). ISBN 978-1-910021-10-1.
- poem in Cruinneachadh: A Gathering (2023), Marcas Mac an Tuairnair (translator, ed.). ISBN 978-1-8384085-5-8.
