= Schmierer =

Schmierer is a surname found in Germany, Australia, and the United States. Notable people with this surname include:

- August Schmierer (1870 – after 1900), a German rugby union player
- Elisabeth Schmierer (born 1955), a German musicologist
- Joscha Schmierer (born 1942), a German politician and author
- Maura Schmierer, who co-filed a lawsuit against Aggressive Christianity Missionary Training Corps
- Miriam Schmierer (1899 – 2011), an Australian supercentenarian
- Richard Schmierer (born 1950), an American diplomat

== See also ==
- Schmierer, a German variant of the card game Sedma
