= St Brigid's Church, Kilbirnie =

Church in North Ayrshire, Scotland

St Brigid's Church
- St Brigid's Church
- 55°45′09″N 4°41′11″W
- Denomination: Roman Catholic
- Website: St Brigid's

History
- Dedication: Saint Brigid

Administration
- Province: St Andrews and Edinburgh
- Diocese: Diocese of Galloway
- Parish: Kilbirnie

Clergy
- Bishop: William Nolan

St Brigid's is the church for the Roman Catholic Parish of Kilbirnie, in the Diocese of Galloway in North Ayrshire, Scotland.

== History ==
A group of Christians began worshipping there in 1858; the church and presbytery were built in simple Gothic style in 1862 and a school was opened in 1894.

Fr Thomas P Lee was a young Irish priest ordained at All Hallows Missionary College in Dublin, Ireland; originally from Limerick. He first was sent in 1859 to be the resident priest in Kilbirnie in Ayrshire. He travelled by horse weekly from his base in Johnstone in the neighbouring county of Renfrewshire to Kilbirnie. Somehow he raised the money and found land to build his church and chose as the patron saint of the parish, St. Brigid (devotion to the poor). Opened in 1862, the modest structure was a Gothic styled rectangular building with a gallery, porch, vestry, confessional and a related presbytery. Fr Lee died two years later at the age of 33.

At the time, Kilbirnie parish was in the Archdiocese of Glasgow, hence the connection with Johnstone. Following the reorganisation of the Archdiocese of Glasgow in 1947, parishes in the northern part of Ayrshire were transferred to the Diocese of Galloway.

It was decided that the increasing post war population called for the church to be renovated and enlarged. There was to be an extension to the rear of the existing church. In front a new porch and baptistery were added to the old structure. The renovated and expanded church was opened in 1957. Conveniently the schoolmaster's house next door was also purchased to replace the more distant presbytery on Parkhouse Drive. When the church was completed there was to be a new sanctuary and sacristy with accommodation for the altar boys.

== 21st century ==
St Brigid's is one of three churches in the parish; the other two are Our Lady's (Beith) and St Palladius (Dalry).
