= Glengarnock railway station =

Railway station in North Ayrshire, Scotland

Glengarnock Scottish Gaelic: Gleann Gairneag
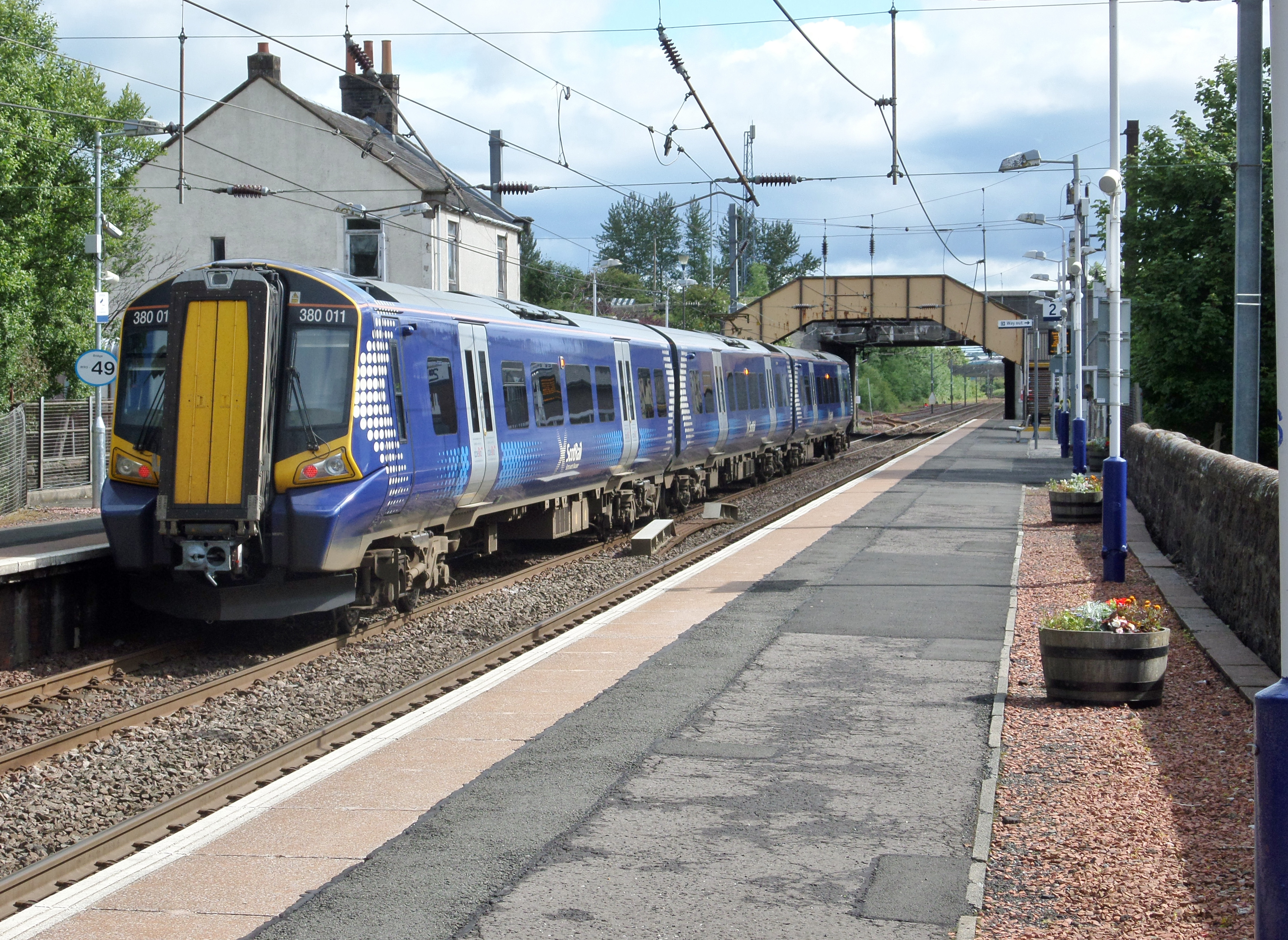
- Glengarnock station in 2015.

General information
- Location: Glengarnock, North Ayrshire; Scotland
- Coordinates: 55.7389°N 4.6752°W
- Grid reference: NS321527
- Manager: ScotRail
- Transit authority: SPT
- Platforms: 2

Other information
- Station code: GLG

History
- Original company: Glasgow, Paisley, Kilmarnock and Ayr Railway
- Pre-grouping: Glasgow and South Western Railway
- Post-grouping: LMS

Key dates
- 21 July 1840: Opened as Glengarnock and Kilbirnie
- 1 June 1905: Renamed Glengarnock

Passengers
- 2021/22: ▲0.183 million
- 2022/23: ▲0.236 million
- 2023/24: ▲0.282 million
- 2024/25: ▲0.291 million
- 2025/26: ▲0.304 million
Location
Notes
- Passenger statistics from the Office of Rail and Road

Glengarnock railway station is a railway station in the village of Glengarnock, North Ayrshire, Scotland, serving the towns of Beith and Kilbirnie. The station is managed by ScotRail and is on the Ayrshire Coast Line.

== History ==
The station was opened on 21 July 1840 by the Glasgow, Paisley, Kilmarnock and Ayr Railway (later part of the Glasgow and South Western Railway) and was named Glengarnock and Kilbirnie. The station is marked on an 1897 Ordnance Survey maps as Kilbirnie Station. It was renamed Glengarnock on 1 June 1905 to coincide with the opening of the dedicated Kilbirnie railway station on the Dalry and North Johnstone Line. Although this Kilbirnie station closed in 1966, the original station has continued to use only Glengarnock as its name.

== Services ==
There are two trains per hour between Glengarnock and Glasgow in both directions for most of the day, Trains from Glasgow continue to either Largs or Ardrossan Harbour. There is an hourly Sunday service to Glasgow and Largs, along with services to Ardrossan Harbour to meet ferry sailings.

Preceding station	National Rail	Following station
Dalry	ScotRail; Ayrshire Coast Line	Lochwinnoch
	Historical railways	
Dalry; Line and station open	Glasgow and South Western Railway; Glasgow, Paisley, Kilmarnock and Ayr Railway	Beith North; Line open; station closed
