= Walker Memorial Hall, Kilbirnie =

Municipal building in Kilbirnie, Scotland

Walker Memorial Hall
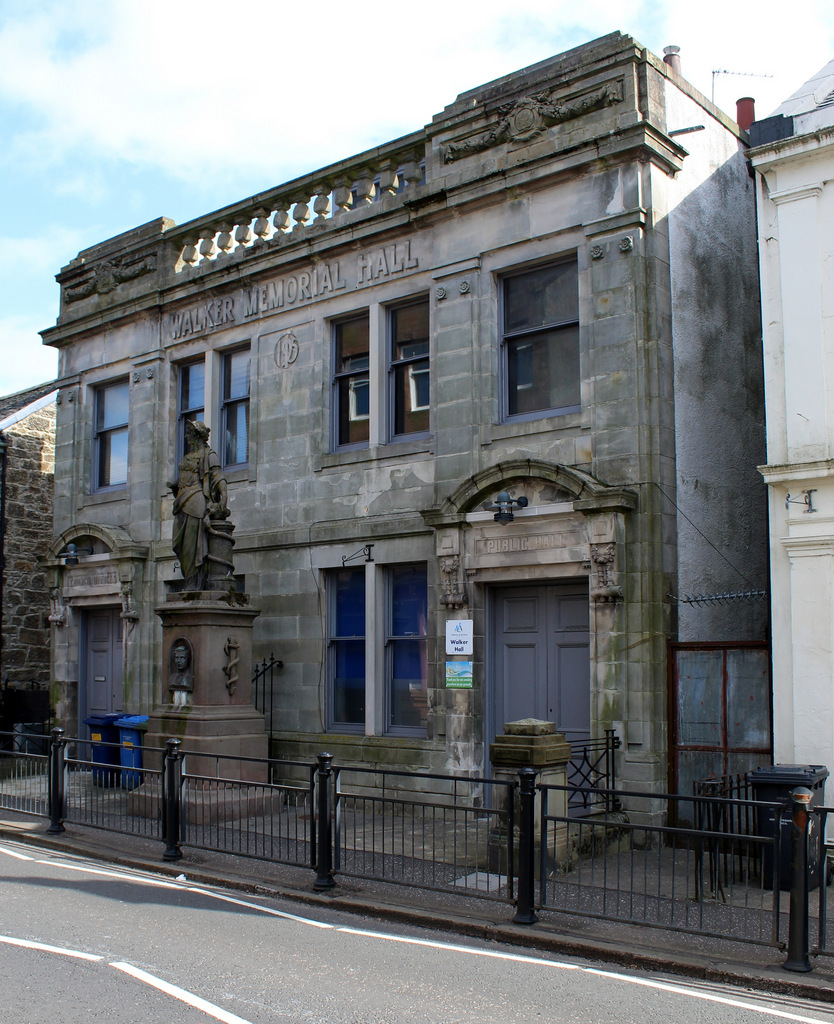
- Walker Memorial Hall

- Shown in North Ayrshire
- 55.7548°N 4.6853°W
- Location: Main Street, Kilbirnie

History
- Built: 1916

Site notes
- Architect: Robert James Walker
- Architectural style: Neoclassical style

The Walker Memorial Hall is a municipal building in Main Street, Kilbirnie, North Ayrshire, Scotland. The structure is currently used as the offices for various local community groups as well as for the local Citizens Advice Bureau.

== History ==
Following the death of the local doctor, William Walker, in 1885, a local friendly society, The Thistle Lodge of Free Gardeners, decided to commission a statue in his honour. The statue, which was sculpted by David Watson Stevenson, depicted a female figure of the Greek goddess, Hygieia, on a plinth. On the west side of the plinth was a carved bust depicting Walker himself. The statue was unveiled outside Walker's home, Walkerstone House, in Main Street on 16 June 1894. (Note: The statue was later relocated to the pavement outside the Walker Memorial Hall.)

In the early 20th century, Walker's son, who was also a doctor and named William, wrote to parish council from his home Buenos Aires enclosing a donation of £4,000 for the benefit of the people of Kilbirnie. The parish council decide to use the money to erect a complex containing council offices and a public hall on a site in Main Street. The new building was designed by Robert James Walker of Glasgow in the neoclassical style, built in ashlar stone at a cost of £5,200 and was officially opened in the presence of the chairman of the parish council, John Riddet, on 9 September 1916.

The design involved a symmetrical main frontage of four bays facing onto Main Street. The outer bays, which were slightly projected forward, featured doorways flanked by pilasters and brackets supporting entablatures surmounted by segmental pediments. The left-hand entablature was inscribed with the words "Council Offices" while the right-hand entablature was inscribed with the words "Public Hall". The outer bays were fenestrated by single sash windows on the first floor, while the inner bays were fenestrated by pairs of sash windows on both floors. The outer bays were flanked by full-height pilasters supporting an entablature inscribed with the words "Walker Memorial Hall". At roof level, there was a parapet which was balustraded above the inner bays. Internally, the principal room was the main assembly hall.

In 1931, the parish council acquired an adjacent building, the Imperial Hotel, creating additional kitchen facilities for the memorial hall as well as living accommodation for its caretaker. Alterations were also made to the main assembly hall to a design by James Houston at that time, and then to a design by Houston and his son, James Brodie Gilmour Houston, in 1964. These two sets of alterations substantially extended the main assembly hall enabling it to accommodate 820 people seated. In the 1960s, it was used a concert venue: notable performers at that time include Gerry and the Pacemakers, Bill Haley & His Comets and Dusty Springfield.

Following the completion of an extensive refurbishment, which cost £100,000 and was financed by North Ayrshire Council, the building re-opened as the offices for various local community groups and for the local Citizens Advice Bureau in February 2017.
