= Lochwinnoch railway station =

Railway station in Renfrewshire, Scotland

Lochwinnoch Scottish Gaelic: Loch Uinneach
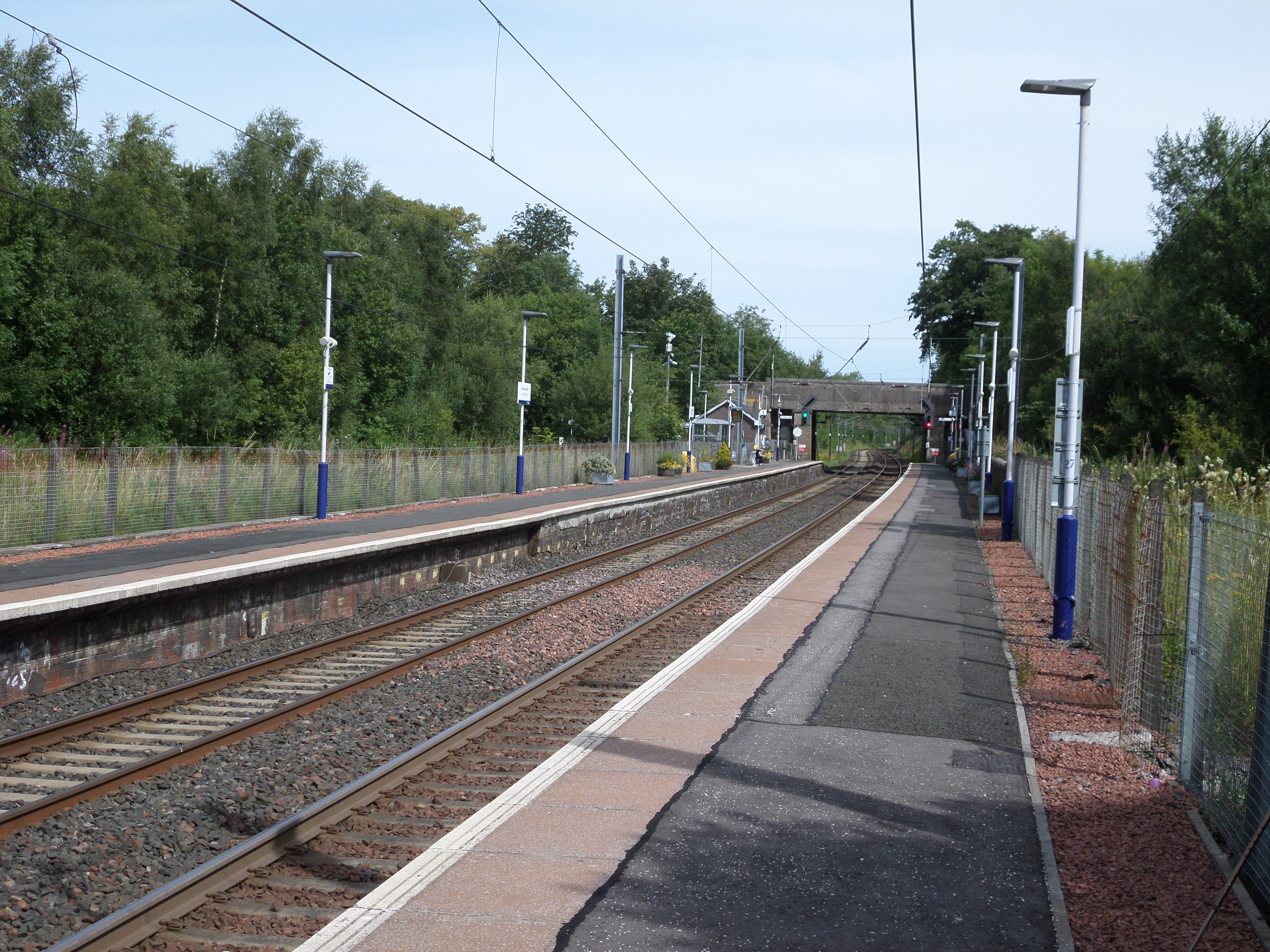
- Lochwinnoch railway station, looking north-east towards Howwood

General information
- Location: Lochwinnoch, Renfrewshire; Scotland
- Coordinates: 55.7867°N 4.6164°W
- Grid reference: NS360579
- Manager: ScotRail
- Transit authority: SPT
- Platforms: 2

Other information
- Station code: LHW

History
- Original company: Glasgow, Paisley, Kilmarnock and Ayr Railway
- Pre-grouping: Glasgow and South Western Railway
- Post-grouping: LMS

Key dates
- 12 August 1840: Opened
- 1 June 1905: Renamed Lochside
- 4 July 1955: Closed
- 27 June 1966: Reopened
- 13 May 1985: Renamed Lochwinnoch

Passengers
- 2021/22: ▲88,590
- 2022/23: ▲0.117 million
- 2023/24: ▲0.138 million
- 2024/25: ▼0.135 million
- 2025/26: ▲0.142 million
Location
Notes
- Passenger statistics from the Office of Rail and Road

Lochwinnoch railway station is a railway station serving the village of Lochwinnoch, Renfrewshire, Scotland. The station is managed by ScotRail and is on the Ayrshire Coast Line.

== History ==
The station was opened on 12 August 1840 by the Glasgow, Paisley, Kilmarnock and Ayr Railway. Upon the opening of the new Lochwinnoch station on the Dalry and North Johnstone Line, the station was renamed Lochside on 1 June 1905. The station closed on 4 July 1955; however, it reopened on 27 June 1966 when the newer station closed. Lochside station was renamed back to Lochwinnoch on 13 May 1985 during the electrification of the line by British Rail.

== Services ==
The basic off-peak weekday & Saturday service operates every 30 minutes to Glasgow Central and Ayr. Additional trains to/from Ardrossan Harbour and/or Largs call in the weekday peaks. The evening (to Ardrossan Harbour) & Sunday (to Largs) service is hourly each way.

Preceding station	National Rail	Following station
Glengarnock	ScotRail; Ayrshire Coast Line	Howwood
	Historical railways	
Beith North; Line open; station closed	Glasgow and South Western Railway; Glasgow, Paisley, Kilmarnock and Ayr Railway	Howwood; Line and station open
