= Dudley triangle =

Triangular array of integers following a modular formula

Dudley Triangle may also refer to a neighborhood of Boston, Massachusetts.

In mathematics, the Dudley triangle is a triangular array of integers that was defined by Underwood Dudley (1987). It consists of the numbers

$$\begin{matrix}
&&&&&2&&&&\\
&&&&2&&2&&&\\
&&&2&&1&&2&&\\
&&2&&0&&0&&2&\\
&2&&6&&5&&6&&2\\
&&&&&\vdots&&&&
\end{matrix}$$
(sequence A036238 in the OEIS).

Dudley exhibited several rows of this triangle, and challenged readers to find the next row; the challenge was met by J. G. Mauldon, who proposed two different solutions. In one of Mauldon's solutions, the number at the intersection of the mth and nth diagonals (counting the top of the triangle as having m = n = 1) is given by the formula
$$a(n,m) = m^2 + mn + n^2 - 1 \mod (n+m+1).$$
