= Beith North railway station =

Railway station serving the north of the town of Beith, North Ayrshire, Scotland

Beith North
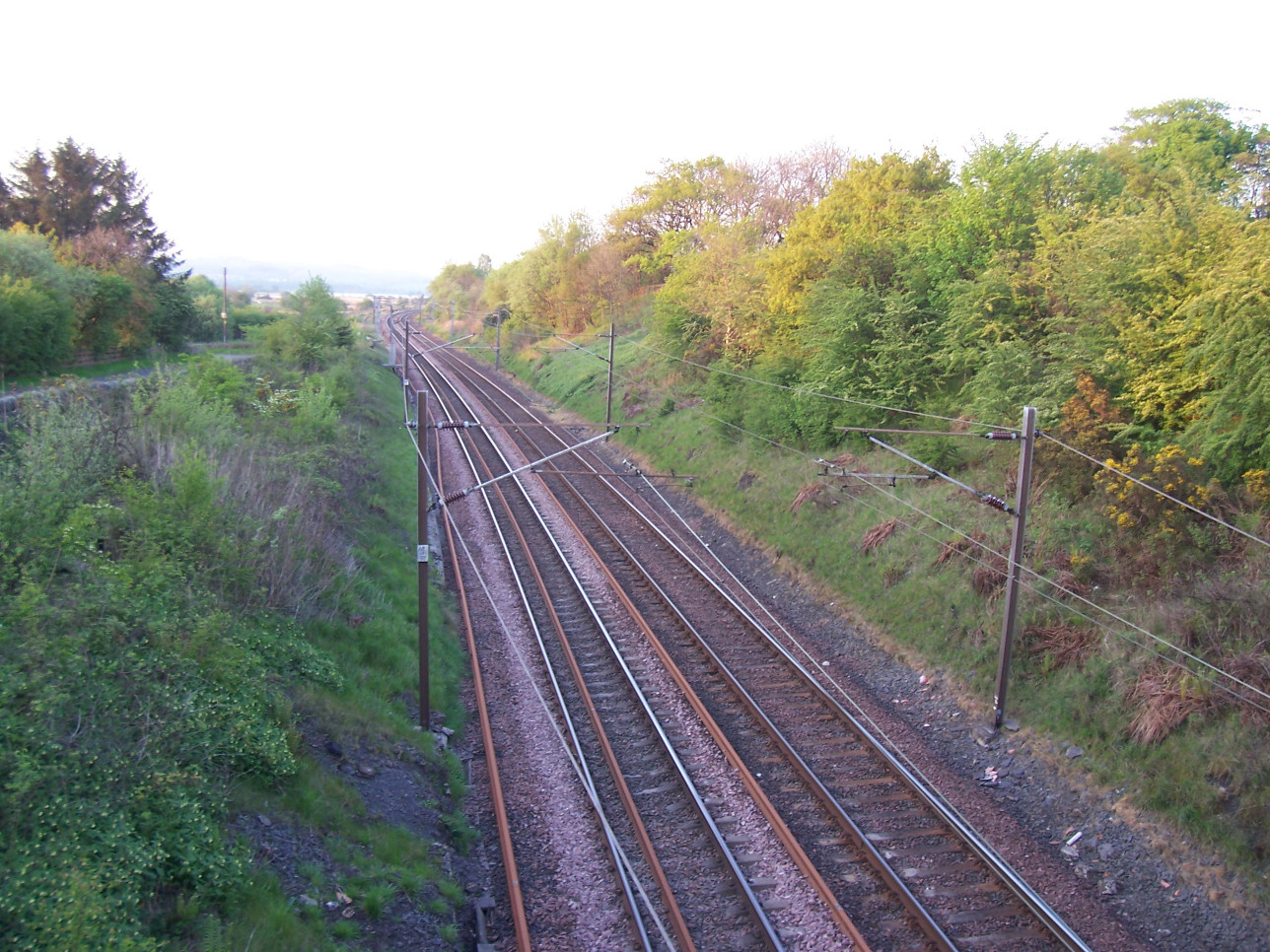
- The site of Beith North in 2007.

General information
- Location: Beith, Ayrshire; Scotland
- Coordinates: 55.7615°N 4.6481°W
- Grid reference: NS339551
- Platforms: 2

Other information
- Status: Disused

History
- Original company: Glasgow, Paisley, Kilmarnock and Ayr Railway
- Pre-grouping: Glasgow and South Western Railway
- Post-grouping: LMS

Key dates
- 21 July 1840: Opened as Beith
- 2 June 1924: Renamed Beith North
- 4 June 1951: Closed
Location

Beith North railway station was a railway station serving the north of the town of Beith, North Ayrshire, Scotland. The station was originally part of the Glasgow, Paisley, Kilmarnock and Ayr Railway (later part of the Glasgow and South Western Railway (G&SWR), now the Ayrshire Coast Line).

== History ==
The station opened on 21 July 1840 when it was simply known as Beith. Upon the grouping of the G&SWR into the London, Midland and Scottish Railway (LMS) in 1923, the station was renamed Beith North on 2 June 1924. The name change was to avoid confusion with the Caledonian/G&SW jointly owned nearby station of same the name, which was also incorporated into the LMS. Beith North closed permanently on 4 June 1951.

=== Reopening ===
As part of Garnock Valley Local Place Plan, there are long-term aspirations to reopen Beith North Station. This is included in the Beith Expansion Masterplan part of the Local Place Plan and it is suggested it would be located at Kings Road, with walking and cycling links to the area. The Local Place Plan is supported by North Ayrshire Council and the Garnock Valley Working Group, amongst other organisations.

Preceding station	Historical railways	Following station
Glengarnock; Line and station open	Glasgow and South Western Railway; Glasgow, Paisley, Kilmarnock and Ayr Railway	Lochwinnoch; Line and station open
