= Kilbirnie =

Town in North Ayrshire, Scotland

Coordinates: 55.755°N 4.686°W

Kilbirnie: Scottish Gaelic: Cill Bhraonaigh
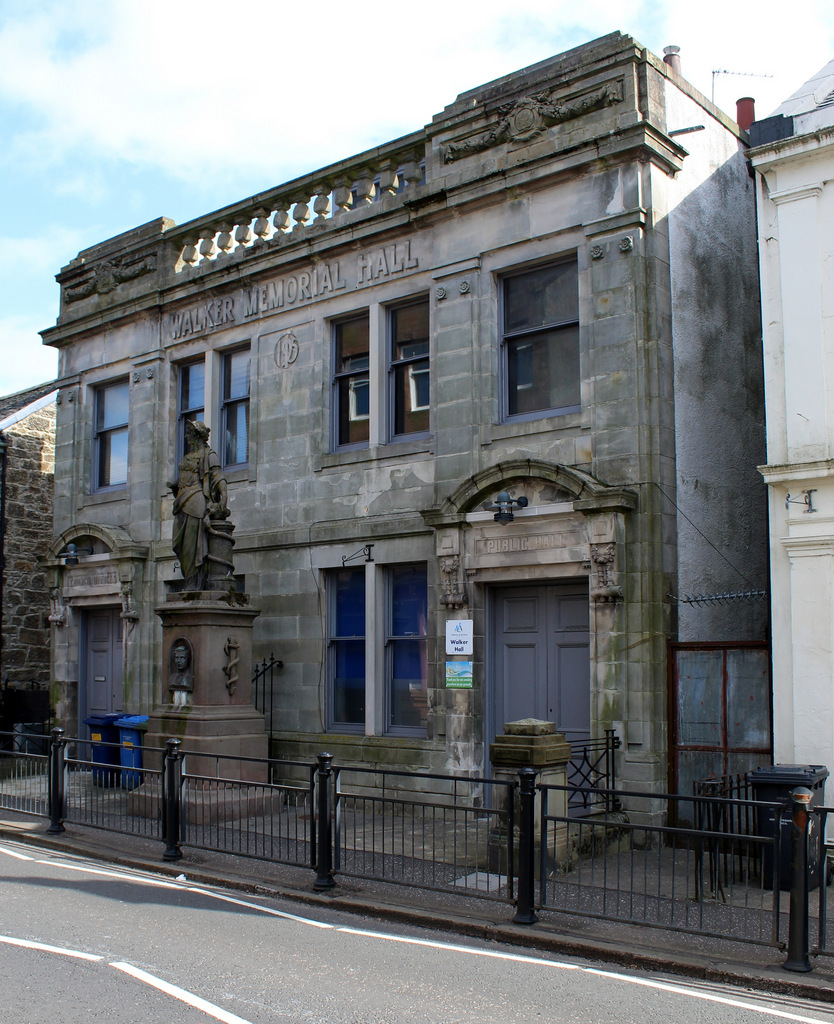
- Walker Memorial Hall

- Location within North Ayrshire
- Population: 7,170 (2020)
- OS grid reference: NS315545
  - Edinburgh: 60 mi (100 km)
  - London: 348 mi (560 km)
- Council area: North Ayrshire
- Lieutenancy area: Ayrshire and Arran
- Country: Scotland
- Sovereign state: United Kingdom
- Post town: KILBIRNIE
- Postcode district: KA25
- Dialling code: 01505
- Police: Scotland
- Fire: Scottish
- Ambulance: Scottish
- UK Parliament: North Ayrshire and Arran
- Scottish Parliament: Cunninghame North

Kilbirnie (Scottish Gaelic: Cill Bhraonaigh) is a town situated in the Garnock Valley of North Ayrshire, on the west coast of Scotland. It is around 20 miles (30 km) southwest of Glasgow and approximately 10 miles (16 kilometres) from Paisley and 13 miles (21 kilometres) from Irvine respectively. Historically, the town's main industries were flax production and weaving before iron and steelmaking took over in the 19th and early 20th centuries. The suburb of Kilbirnie in the New Zealand capital of Wellington is named after the town.

== History ==
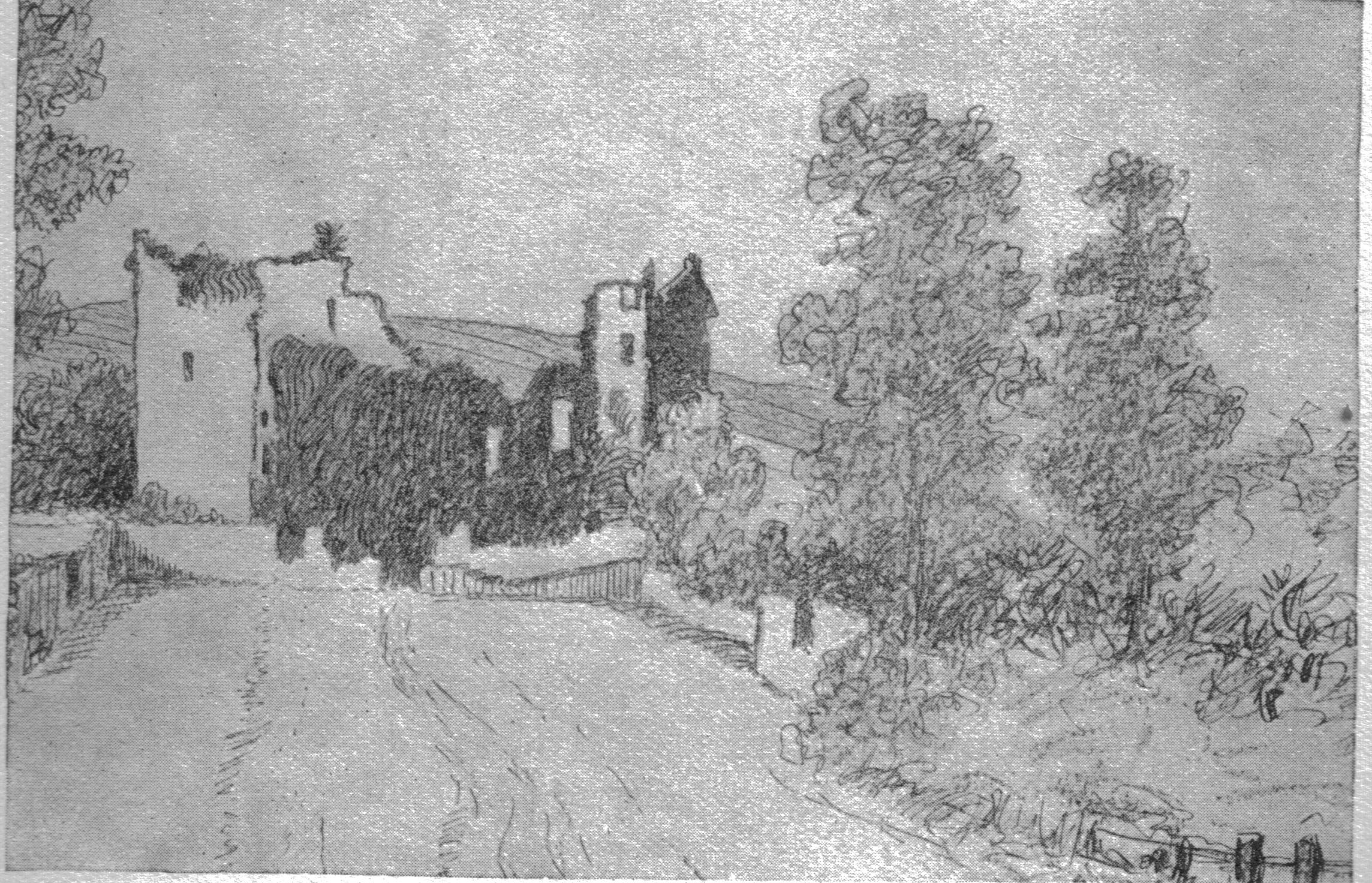
Kilbirnie Place, where the Scots mustered under Alexander III before the Battle of Largs

Archaeological digs conducted in the 19th century have shown that the area was inhabited during the Bronze Age. A crannog with a connecting causeway was discovered in Kilbirnie Loch. In 1792 Mr Dickie, the miller at the Nether Mill, was building the road near the mill pond when he uncovered an empty stone coffin, 6.5 feet long by 2.5 feet wide. He is recorded to have broken up the coffin and used it in the road's construction. The earth mound known as the 'Miller's Knowe' has been identified as an 'ancient sepulchral tumuli', a burial mound, in the New Statistical Account of Ayrshire.

The town derived its name from the parish church, the "Auld Kirk". In 1740 there were only three houses; the population grew to 959 people by 1801. Half a century later, the town had grown substantially; in 1851 Kilbirnie contained 5,484 people, due to the Industrial Revolution. Growth continued with the opening of Kilbirnie railway station in 1906.

The 1913 networkers' strike in Kilbirnie was agreed at a National Federation of Women Workers meeting in late March. It lasted from April to September 1913, and was the longest recorded strike of women workers at that time. The strike, which enjoyed community support, was led by Kate McLean. In May 1913 there was a meeting in Kilbirnie where 10,000 supporters were present. The networkers' dispute was resolved on 2 September 1913 with improved wages and working conditions.

The Decoy Bride, a film starring David Tennant and Kelly Macdonald, was partially filmed in Kilbirnie.

== Industry ==
=== Glengarnock Steelworks ===
Glengarnock Steel Works opened its blast furnaces around 1841 which caused a massive influx of people from all over the country, as well as all over the world. Initially, these works were owned by Merry & Cunninghame before being taken over by David Colville & Sons and eventually nationalised as part of British Steel Corporation and finally closed in 1985. The steelworks in Glengarnock provided employment for most men of the community.

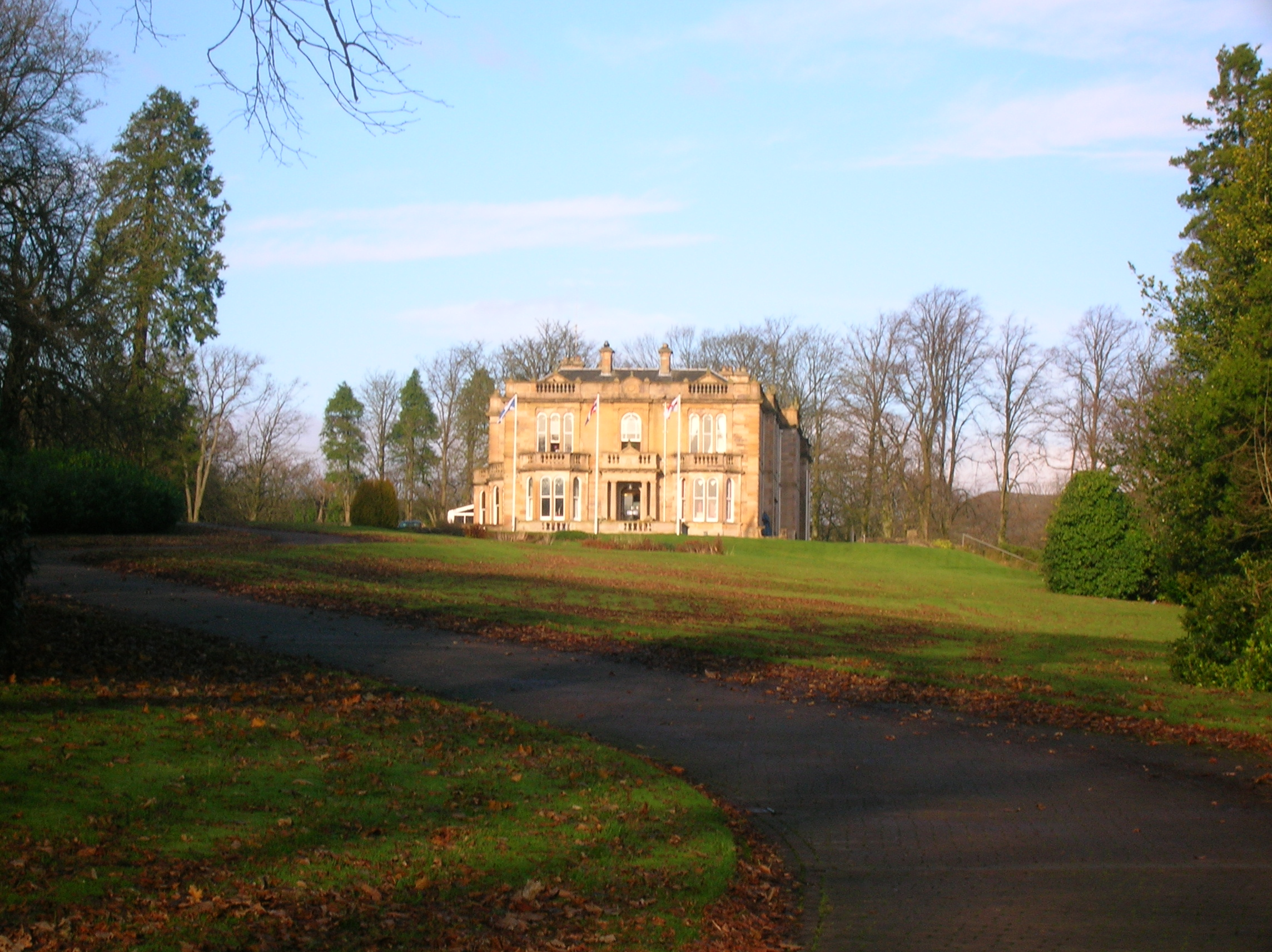
Moorpark House.

=== W & J Knox Threadmills ===
These mills are famous for their nets, used by the British Army and BT Tower. They are one of the very few companies in the United Kingdom who have expertise in this field. W & J Knox Threadmills was owned by the Knox family who were prominent, not only in Ayrshire but in the South of England too, becoming important members of society.

=== Nether Mill ===
Once the barony mill, it was known as the 'Nethermiln of Kilbirnie.' Until circa 1938, this Nether Mill, a corn and meal mill, was located on Knoxville Road. The remains of the cast iron waterwheel and walls of part of the mill are still visible (datum 2022).

=== Modern day ===
Since the closure of the steel works in the 1980s, the area has been an unemployment blackspot with distinct social problems. The town has very few local employers, and people generally commute out of the town to work. Glengarnock railway station serves the town and has three trains per hour to Paisley and Glasgow.

== Social history ==
=== Swinging Sixties and regeneration ===
Amongst many other old buildings in the town, stands the Walker Memorial Hall, a building dedicated to Dr Walker, one of the first physicians in the town. In the 1960s it was a famous concert venue, coming second only to the Barrowland Ballroom in Glasgow. Famous bands to have played the hall include Gerry and the Pacemakers and Bill Haley & His Comets. These days, it is home to a gym ran by KA leisure as well as the Garnock Valley's Community Learning and Development (CLD) team.

Other sources of entertainment in the 1950s and 1960s included two cinemas, both of which have long since closed. One of these cinemas is now the Radio City.

=== Saint Brennan's Day Fair and Robert Burns ===
The fair was considered the largest horse market in the west of Scotland. Robert Burns refers to the town in his poem "The Inventory" about a plough-horse that he purchased at the fair:

"My furr-ahin 's a wordy beast,

As e'er in tug or tow was traced. The fourth's a Highland Donald hastle,

A damn'd red-wud Kilburnie blastie!"

Local football team Kilbirnie Ladeside F.C. derive their sobriquet "the blasties" from the poem, a suitable appellation and an epithet which remains to this day due to the town's past of steel and iron production, as a reference to the blast furnaces.

== Notable residents ==
- Kimberly Benson, professional wrestler.
- Jameson Clark, actor, starring in films such as Whisky Galore!
- James Jameson, Surgeon General, Army Medical Service
- Joanne Love, footballer
- Gordon McQueen, former Scotland, Manchester United and Leeds United footballer and Sky Sports presenter.
- George Stevenson, former Scotland and Motherwell F.C. footballer, went on to be the club's most successful manager
- Lorna J Waite, academic, poet and community activist
- Allan Wilson, Politician, former Labour Member of the Scottish Parliament and Scottish Government Minister.

== Places of worship ==
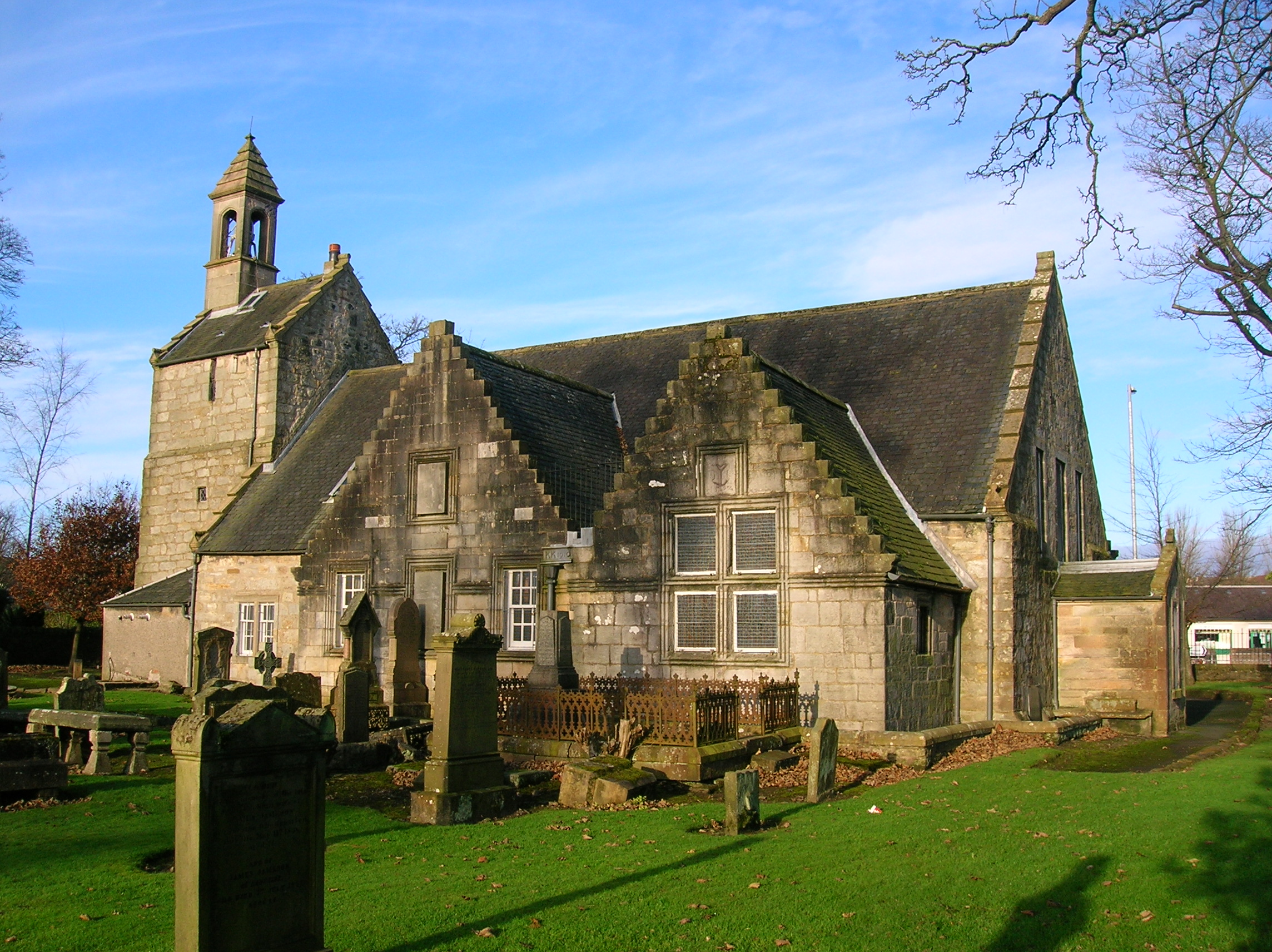
The Auld Kirk

=== Auld Kirk ===
The "Auld Kirk" is one of the oldest churches in Scotland still in use both pre-and post-Reformation. It is a Category A listed building.

=== Roman Catholic Church St Brigid's ===
The church was established in 1858 and the current building opened in 1862.

=== Gospel Hall ===
Tracing its roots back to 1889, the mission hall was completed in 1897.

== Education ==
=== Primary education ===
- Moorpark Primary School, accessed from Milton Road or School Road by students, was opened in 1978 to replace Ladyland School built in 1869 and Bridgend School, built in 1893. The school is located east of its namesake Moorpark House and is adjacent to the former site of local secondary school Garnock Academy. The new Moorpark Primary School is currently under construction on the site of Garnock Academy, due to open in Autumn 2022.
- Glengarnock Primary School has from 10 January 2017 been situated in the Garnock Community Campus.
- Saint Bridget's Primary School, located on Hagthorne Avenue, educates local children of Roman Catholic and Christian parents. This location opened in October 1963 replacing the 1894 building.

=== Secondary education ===
- Garnock Academy is a secondary school formed in 1971 by the amalgamation of Beith Academy, Dalry High School, Kilbirnie Central School and Speir's school. Opening in September 1972, it was on School Road adjacent to Moorpark Primary. In January 2017, the school moved into the new Garnock Community Campus in the Glengarnock area alongside the primary school, community pool and library and other public offices and areas. It is a non-denominational co-educational school serving Barmill, Beith, Dalry, Gateside, Glengarnock, Kilbirnie, Longbar and the surrounding area. It has around 1,100 pupils.

== Transport ==
=== Rail ===
- The town is serviced by Glengarnock railway station which runs regular services managed by ScotRail on the Ayrshire Coast Line. There are three trains per hour to Glasgow Mon - Sat, and an hourly service on Sunday.

=== Bus services ===
The area is served by Stagecoach West Scotland and McGill's Bus Services.

- 25, 25A, 25B and 25C Beith - Irvine Cross / Bourtreehill / Broomlands / Montgomerie Park
- 904 Largs - Paisley
- X36 Glasgow - Dalry

== Landmarks ==
=== Air crashes ===
The hills between Kilbirnie and Largs were often black spots for aircraft passing over and many crashed due to low fog. The crash sites are available to visit, with wreckage still visible and some of these now form part of Clyde Muirshiel Regional Park.

=== Castles ===
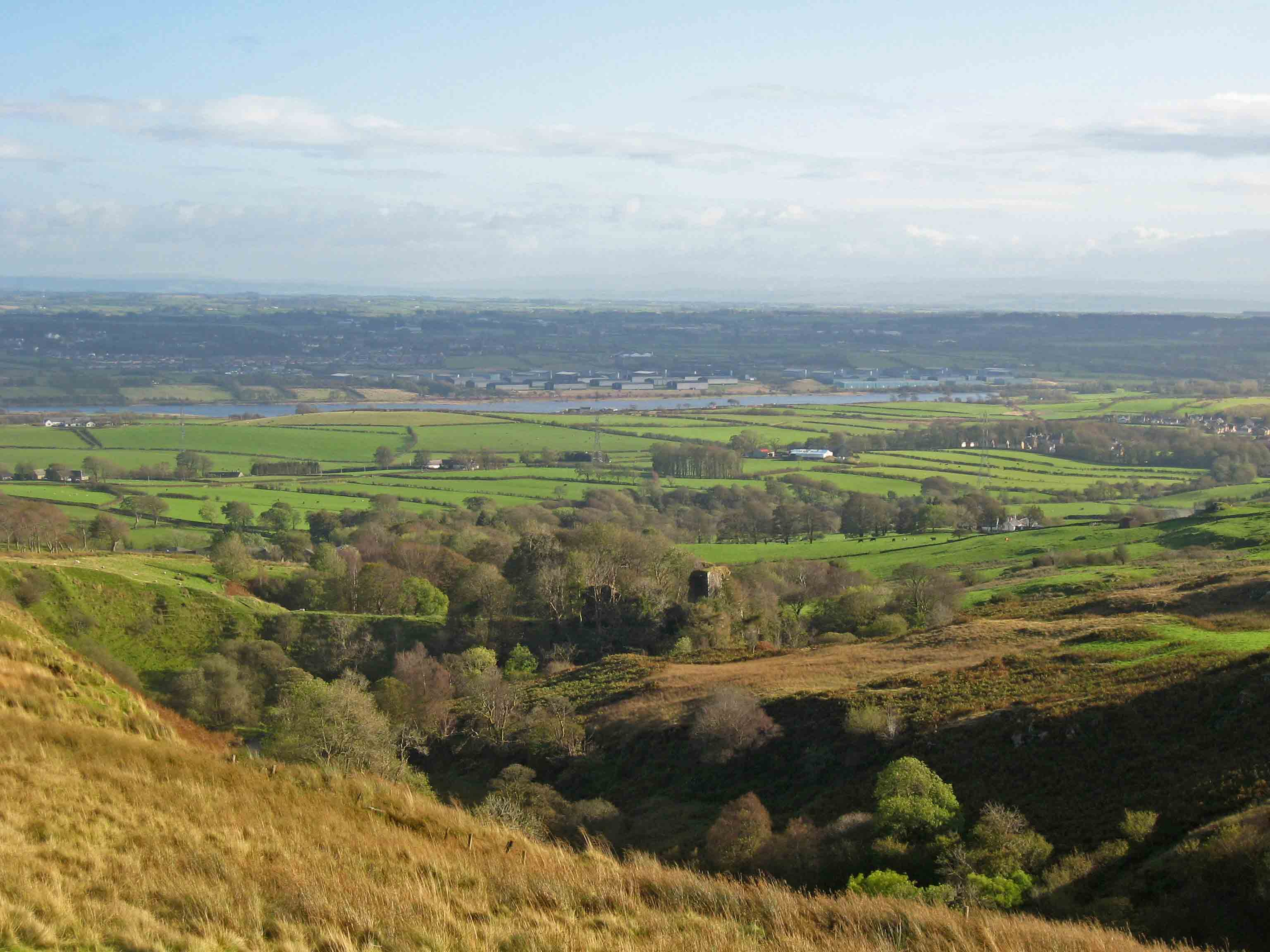
Glengarnock Castle, looking towards Kilbirnie Loch and the northern suburbs of Kilbirnie.

Lying two miles (three kilometres) north of Kilbirnie on a promontory overlooking the wooded ravine of the River Garnock is Glengarnock Castle, a ruined 15th century keep. Ladyland Castle, mostly demolished, lay nearby and Ladyland House still survives as designed by David Hamilton.

=== Kilbirnie Loch ===
Kilbirnie Loch is 1 1/2 miles (2.4 km) long and nearly 1/2 mile (800 m) broad.

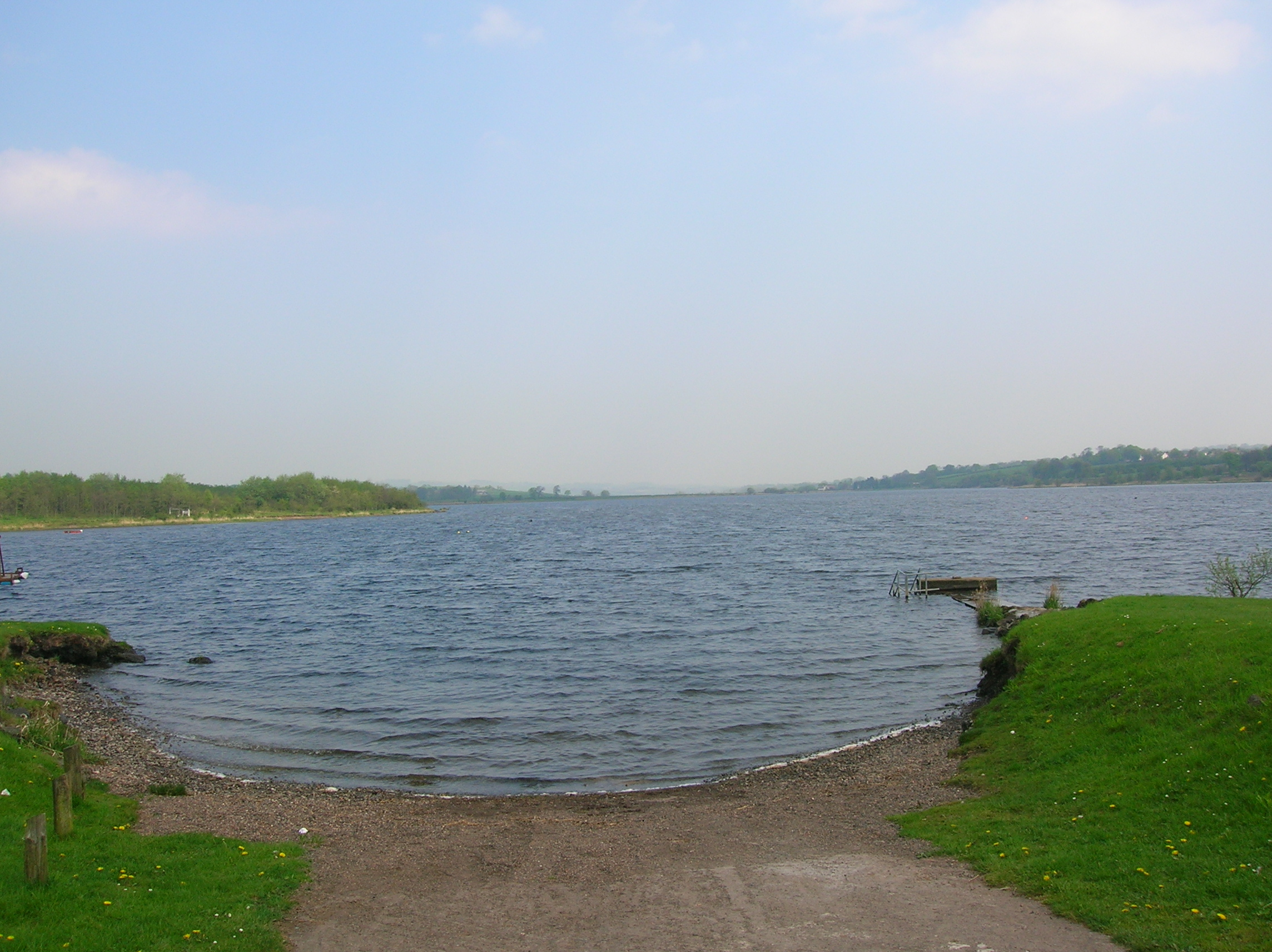
The loch in summer

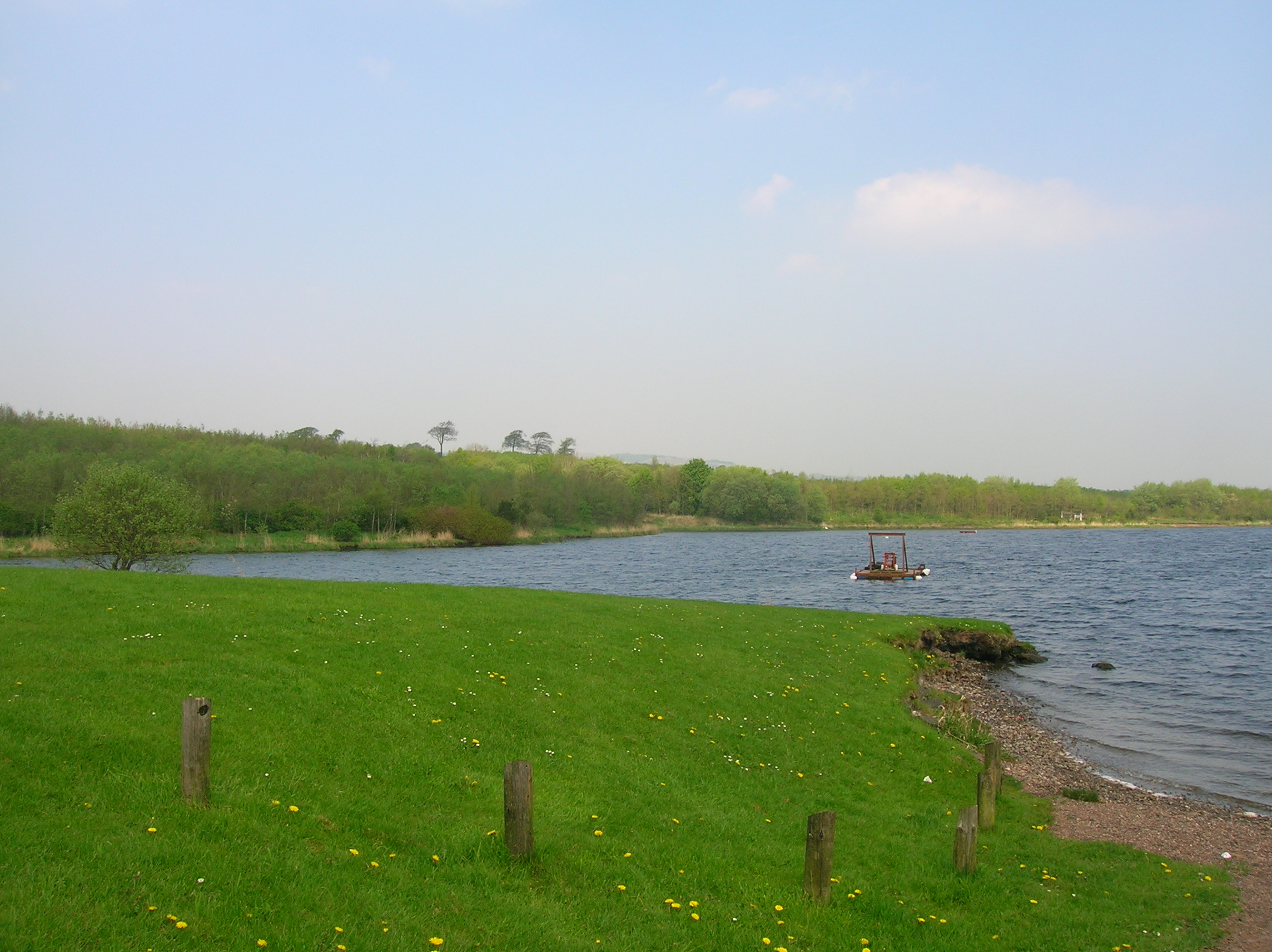
Looking towards Kilbirnie

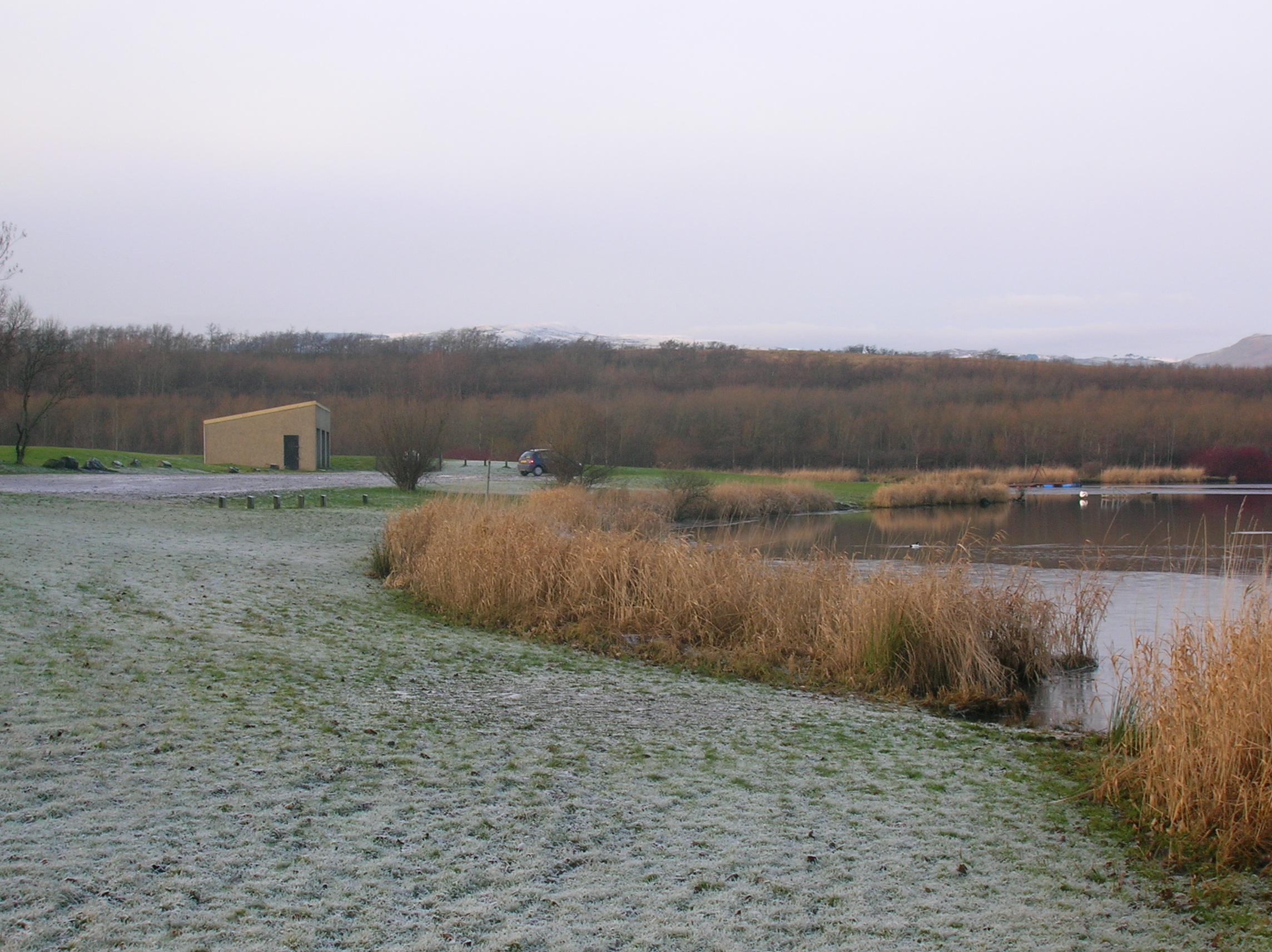
Kilbirnie Loch boat house

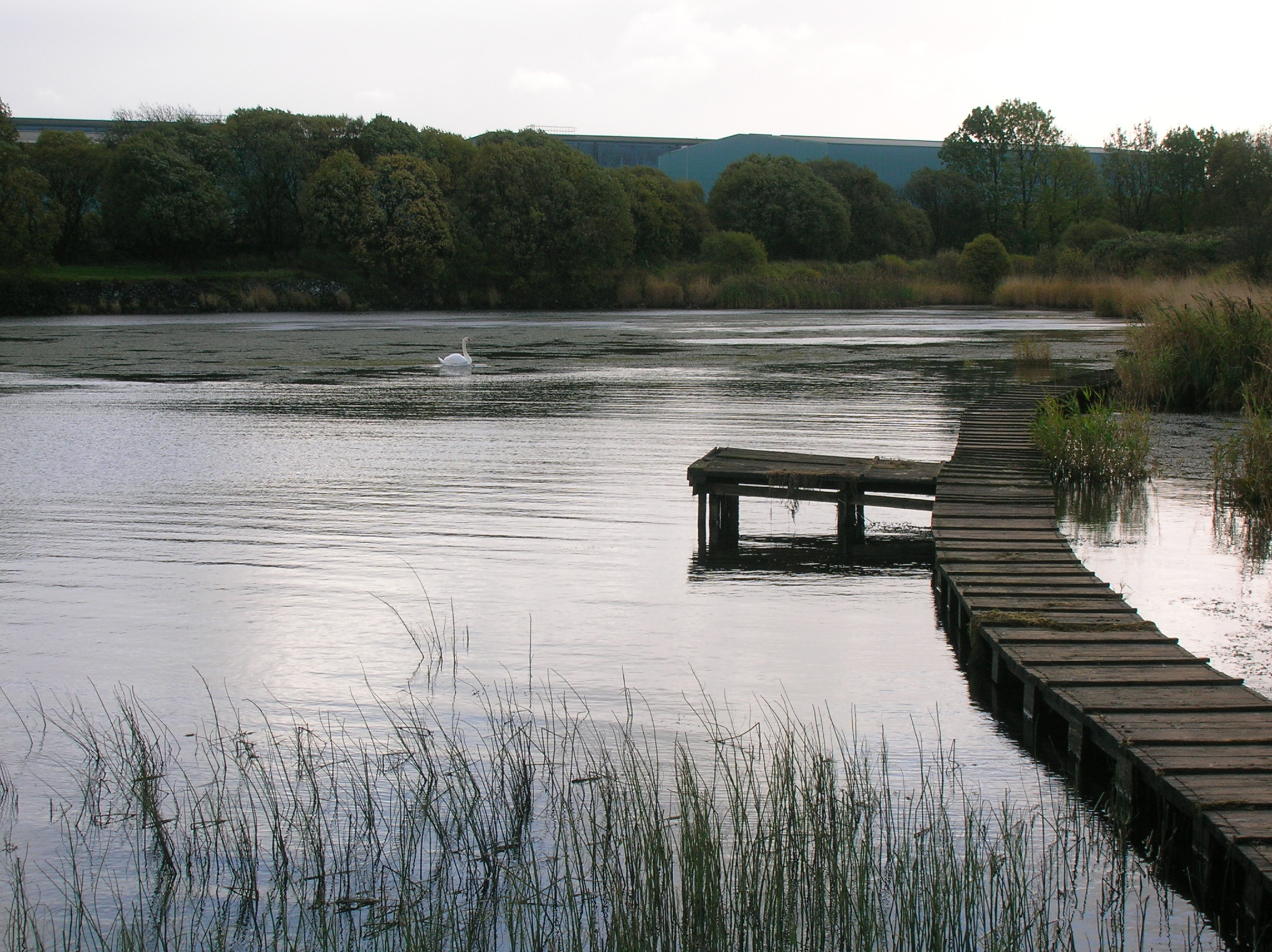
The south end of the loch

== Bibliography ==
- Strawhorn, J. & Boyd, W. (1951) The third statistical account of Scotland: Ayrshire. Edinburgh: Oliver & Boyd.
- Wylie, William (1851). Ayrshire Streams. London : Arthur Hall, Virtue, & Co.
- "Un Hombre bueno, La Vida De Jaime Clifford" (AC Thomson)
