= Dalry railway station =

Railway station in North Ayrshire, Scotland

Dalry Scottish Gaelic: Dail Fhraoich
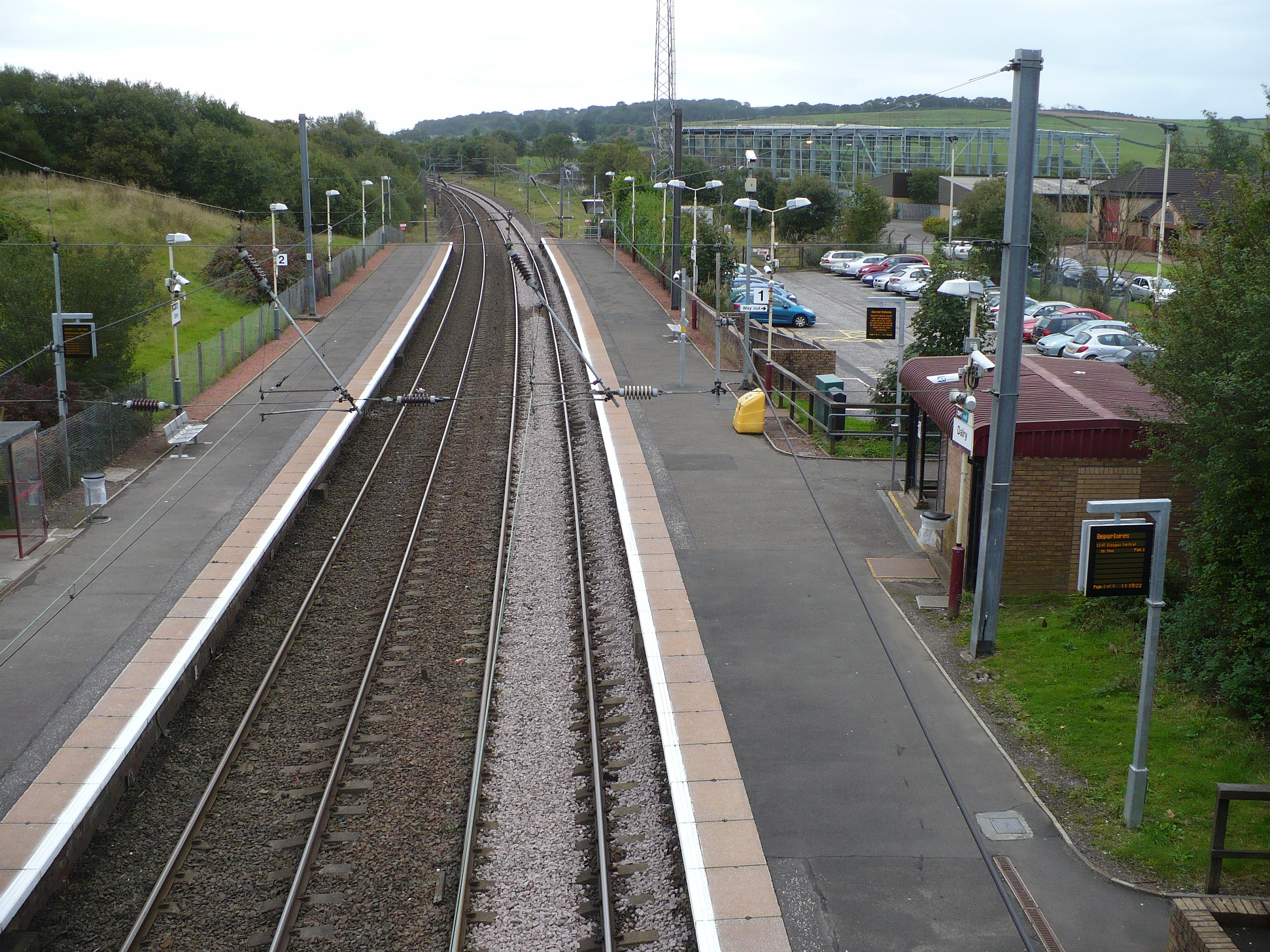
- Dalry Station in October 2009

General information
- Location: Dalry, North Ayrshire; Scotland
- Coordinates: 55.7060°N 4.7112°W
- Grid reference: NS297491
- Manager: ScotRail
- Transit authority: SPT
- Platforms: 2

Other information
- Station code: DLY

History
- Original company: Glasgow, Paisley, Kilmarnock and Ayr Railway
- Pre-grouping: Glasgow and South Western Railway
- Post-grouping: LMS

Key dates
- 21 July 1840: Opened
- c. 1905: Station expanded to four platforms
- 1980s: Station remodelled back to two platforms

Passengers
- 2021/22: ▲0.102 million
- 2022/23: ▲0.139 million
- 2023/24: ▲0.162 million
- 2024/25: ▲0.168 million
- 2025/26: ▲0.177 million
Location
Notes
- Passenger statistics from the Office of Rail and Road

Dalry railway station is a railway station serving the town of Dalry, North Ayrshire, Scotland. The station is managed by ScotRail and is on the Ayrshire Coast Line.

== History ==
The station was opened on 21 July 1840 by the Glasgow, Paisley, Kilmarnock and Ayr Railway. The station originally had two side platforms until the Dalry and North Johnstone Line was opened by the Glasgow and South Western Railway in 1905, when the station was remodeled with four platforms over two islands. Each new platform was 765 feet (233 m) long to accommodate the increased traffic, and were accessed via gangways from a covered walkway crossing the lines from the station building. The station also acted as the junction interchange between the line to Ayr and the original G&SWR main line to Kilmarnock, Dumfries and Carlisle from 1860 onwards, though the two routes actually separated a short distance to the west.

With the closure of both the Kilmarnock & North Johnstone lines to passenger traffic in 1966 and to all other traffic in 1973 (Kilmarnock line) & 1977 (North Johnstone Loop), having four lines through the station became superfluous, so the station platforms were remodelled during the line's electrification in the 1980s back to two side platforms. The Ayrshire Coast Line was electrified by British Rail.

== Services ==
A typical service between Monday and Saturday is:

- 2tph to Glasgow Central
- Hourly service to Ardrossan Harbour
- Hourly service to Largs

Stopping patterns change during peak periods, with some Largs services skipping the station and Ayr services calling here instead.

Preceding station	National Rail	Following station
Kilwinning	ScotRail; Ayrshire Coast Line	Glengarnock
	Historical railways	
Connection with GPK&AR at Brownhill Junction	Glasgow and South Western Railway; Dalry and North Johnstone Line	Kilbirnie; Line and station closed
Dalry Junction; Line open; station closed	Glasgow and South Western Railway; Glasgow, Paisley, Kilmarnock and Ayr Railway	Glengarnock; Line and station open
