= Dalry Junction railway station =

Former railway station in Scotland

Dalry Junction

General information
- Location: Dalry, Ayrshire; Scotland
- Coordinates: 55.6977°N 4.7109°W
- Grid reference: NS296482
- Platforms: 2

Other information
- Status: Disused

History
- Original company: Glasgow, Paisley, Kilmarnock and Ayr Railway
- Pre-grouping: Glasgow and South Western Railway

Key dates
- 4 April 1843: Opened
- 2 January 1860: Closed
Location

Dalry Junction railway station was a railway station near the town of Dalry, North Ayrshire, Scotland. The station was originally part of the Glasgow, Paisley, Kilmarnock and Ayr Railway (now the Ayrshire Coast Line).

== History ==
The station was opened on 4 April 1843, and served as an interchange between the lines to Ayr and Kilmarnock from Glasgow. The station's life was short-lived however, and it closed on 2 January 1860, with interchange services moving to Dalry railway station.

In the 1970s the only remnant of this station was the base of a water tank, converted into a small worker's bothy.

| Preceding station | Historical railways | Following station |
|---|---|---|
| Kilwinning; Line and station open | Glasgow and South Western Railway; Glasgow, Paisley, Kilmarnock and Ayr Railway | Dalry; Line and station open |
| Montgreenan; Line and station closed | Glasgow and South Western Railway; Glasgow, Paisley, Kilmarnock and Ayr Railway | Dalry; Line and station open |
