= Variant (magazine) =

Variant (ISSN 0954-8815) was a free cultural magazine based in Glasgow, Scotland, and founded in 1984. Available in both print and internet editions, it was distributed mainly though arts and cultural institutions through Britain and Ireland. Although nominally an arts and cultural bulletin, the magazine also dealt with broader social and political issues, often from a left-leaning perspective. 15,000 copies were distributed per issue.

Volume 1 ran from issue 1 (1984) to 16 (1994), almost twice a year; volume 2 ran from 1996 to 2012, two or three times a year. Contributors included people such as poet and community activist Lorna J Waite, cultural theorist Angela McRobbie, artist Mark Pawson, etc.
