= Die-Cut Plug Wiring Diagram Book =

Cover of Die-Cut Plug Wiring Diagram Book, by Mark Pawson, 1992

Die-Cut Plug Wiring Diagram Book is an artist's book by the English artist Mark Pawson, originally published in early 1992. Originally consisting of 36 full-size reproductions of British AC power plug wiring diagrams printed in various colours, the book has become celebrated as an example of English sociological art, and is sometimes referred to as part of the New Folk Archive. Online gallery Hayvend described it: "the ultra-obsessive die cut plug wiring diagram book [is part of] an avalanche of essential ephemera [collected] by unashamed image junkie Mark Pawson".

'Many of the items [Pawson] produces are made out of his or other people's waste material including comics, flyers, glossy fashion magazines, children's colouring books, braille hymn books, antique paper, wood-chip wallpaper and the odd pornographic magazine. Pawson's most successful pieces are usually made of the most simple materials.'

== Things to collect ==
Pawson started to collect ephemera as a child, starting his collection with Wade animals, aimed squarely at unattached pocket money. Early artist's books to continue the theme included Small Plastic Babies, 1987, collecting together his collection of small plastic babies, Eco-Frenzy, 1992, collecting over 150 recycling and ecology symbols and Moustaches, also 1992, in which Pawson documented his clip=on moustaches. The collection of plug wiring diagrams was originally published at the same time as these last two, but unlike the others has been continuously in print since.

"I collect things for my own amusement and decoration. Every so often a group of objects will push their way to the forefront and demand to be taken a bit more seriously." Mark Pawson

Pawson made his first artist's book whilst studying sociology at City University, London, 1983-84 and has continued his interest in ephemera since. Pawson has become a central figure of UK mail art, and has also participated widely in the emerging worldwide network of artist's bookfairs. Die-Cut Plug Wiring Diagram Book has been exhibited widely, and is in various public collections including MOMA and Tate.

2 Plug Wiring Diagrams

== The book itself ==
The first edition of Die-Cut Plug Wiring Diagram Book is a small softback book containing 36 photocopied plug wiring diagrams, mostly in colour using different coloured toners in monochrome photocopiers; 3 full colour photocopies have been tipped in as well. The 'de-luxe version' of the book is sewn together using different coloured threads that mimic electrical wiring, whilst the ordinary edition is stapled. The 'de-luxe' version sold for £3.00, twice the asking price of the stapled version. The cover is a grainy photocopy of the back of a plug diagram with three holes cut into it (where the pins would go). There is a brief essay at the end by Pawson discussing his collection of plugs, and their essential Britishness. The last page lists credits of 'contributing electricians'.

Later editions of the work acquired a piece of electrical tape bound inside the cover, more images of plugs, as well as adverts for other related commodities made by Pawson. The book has been continually reprinted and updated, and is still available. It currently sells for £5.00. The words Die-Cut Plug Wiring Diagram Book only actually appear at the end of the book, in the body of text of Pawson's afterword; the title has instead been acquired, in the main from references to the work on Pawson's website.

== Reception ==
The book has been included in a number of overviews of contemporary English culture, including Creative Review, Experimental Layout and The New Handmade Graphics. The book is in various public collections including Tate, V&A, and MOMA.
