= Underwood Dudley =

American mathematician and author

Underwood Dudley (born January 6, 1937) is an American mathematician and writer. His popular works include several books describing crank mathematics by pseudomathematicians who incorrectly believe they have squared the circle or done other impossible things.

He is the discoverer of the Dudley triangle.

== Education and career ==
Dudley was born in 1937, in New York City. He received bachelor's and master's degrees from the Carnegie Institute of Technology and a PhD from the University of Michigan. His 1965 doctoral dissertation, The Distribution Modulo 1 of Oscillating Functions, was supervised by William J. LeVeque.

His academic career consisted of two years at Ohio State University followed by 37 years at DePauw University, from which he retired in 2004. He edited the College Mathematics Journal and the Pi Mu Epsilon Journal, and was a Pólya Lecturer for the Mathematical Association of America (MAA) for two years.

He chaired the Indiana Section of the Mathematical Association of America twice, and in 2004 received the section's Meritorious Service Award.

He may be best known for a series of books written for the general audience about pseudomathematics. They are based on his collection of "crank" material sent to mathematics departments from people who believe they have done mathematical tasks that have been proved to be impossible, such as performing angle trisection, or who believe in numerology.

== Publications ==
Dudley is the author of books including:

- Elementary Number Theory (1969; 2nd ed. 1978)
- A Budget of Trisections (1987); revised as The Trisectors (1994)
- Mathematical Cranks (1992)
- Numerology: Or, What Pythagoras Wrought (1997)
- The Magic Numbers of the Professor (with Owen O'Shea, 2007)
- A Guide to Elementary Number Theory (2009)

His edited volumes include:

- Readings for Calculus (1993)
- Is Mathematics Inevitable? A Miscellany (2008)

Dudley won the Trevor Evans Award for expository writing from the Mathematical Association of America in 1996, for his 1994 paper, "Why history?", on why mathematicians should care about the history of mathematics.

== Lawsuit ==
In 1995, Dudley was one of several people sued by William Dilworth for defamation because Mathematical Cranks included an analysis of Dilworth's "A correction in set theory", an attempted refutation of Cantor's diagonal method. The suit was dismissed in 1996 due to failure to state a claim.

The dismissal was upheld on appeal in a decision written by judge Richard Posner. From the decision: "A crank is a person inexplicably obsessed by an obviously unsound idea—a person with a bee in his bonnet. To call a person a crank is to say that because of some quirk of temperament he is wasting his time pursuing a line of thought that is plainly without merit or promise ... To call a person a crank is basically just a colorful and insulting way of expressing disagreement with his master idea, and it therefore belongs to the language of controversy rather than to the language of defamation."
