= Marcas Mac an Tuairneir =

Writer and singer

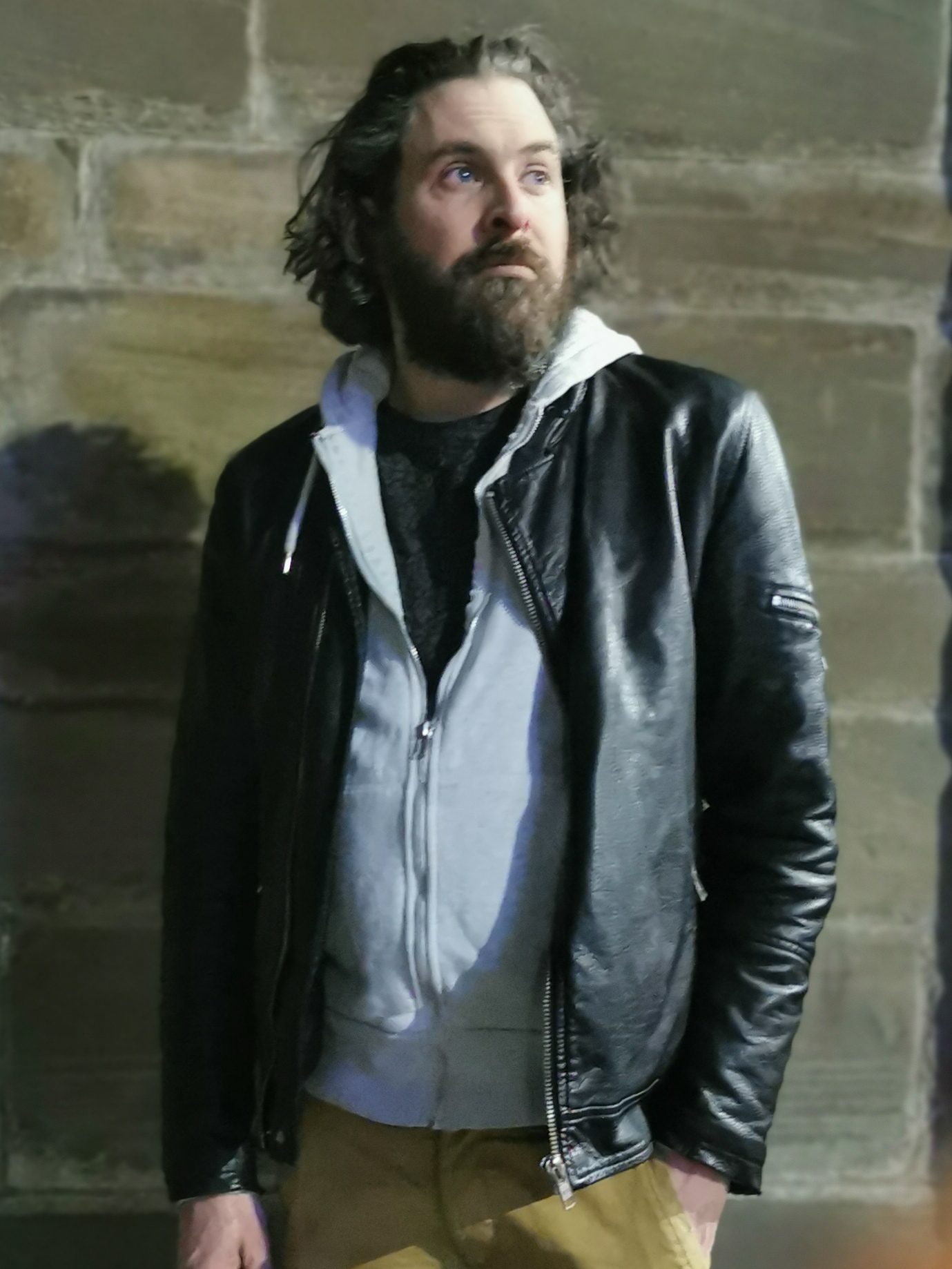
- Born: 1984 (age 41–42); York, England
- Education: University of Aberdeen
- Occupation: Writer
- Writing career
- Genres: Scottish Gaelic poetry, literature
- Website: www.marcasmac.scot

Marcas Mac an Tuairneir (born Mark Spencer Turner, November 28, 1984) is an English writer and singer. He writes and publishes in Scottish Gaelic, English and Polari.

== Life and education ==
Born in York, England, Mac an Tuairneir was educated at All Saints Catholic School, York before, in 2008, earning a master's degree in Gaelic and Hispanic Studies in 2008 at the University of Aberdeen. He earned a MLitt in Scottish and Irish Studies from that university in 2010 and he wrote his thesis about homosexuality and homoeroticism in the poetry of Crìsdean MacIlleBhàin and Cathal Ó Searcaigh. He completed a master's degree in fiction for television at Glasgow Caledonian University between 2011 and 2012.

He currently lives in Edinburgh, where he had worked at the Scottish Poetry Library and is a board member of The Saltire Society and the Scottish Writers' Centre. He is the incumbent chair of the Federation of Writers (Scotland).

== Poetry ==
Mac an Tuairneir has published poetry in Cabhsair, Irish Pages and Poetry Scotland, among other publications. He published his first collection, Deò, in 2013. His second collection, Lus na Tùise, was published in 2016. His third collection, 'Dùileach' was published in 2021 and was shortlisted for the Derick Thompson Prize in 2022. In 2018 he co-authored the Gaelic-Scots-English-language pamphlet 'heelster-gowdie / beul-fo-bhonn' alongside Staurt A. Paterson. His fourth and most ambitious collection to date was the multilingual 'Polaris', with Leamington Books, published in 2022, which included works in Gaelic, self-translated into English, Irish and Polari and including translations by Ifor ap Glyn, Stuart A. Paterson, Sam O Fearraigh, Scott De Buitléir, Taran Spalding-Jenkin, Richard Huddleson and others.

In 2014, he won a Highland Literary Salon prize for his poetry and both first and second place in the Baker Prize. In 2015, he placed second in the William Blake Poetry Prize for his English language poetry. He was shortlisted for the Gaelic award at the Wigtown Book Festival in 2015, 2016 and 2019 and won outright in 2017. In 2012 he was shortlisted at the Comórtas Filíochta an Chornéil Uí Néill (a bilingual competition for Irish and Gaelic language poetry) and, in 2016, for the Douglas Hyde award at the Strokestown Poetry Festival, both Irish organizations. In 2016, he won the competition 'Write Up North!" at the Scottish Association of Writers.

He contributes literary and artistic criticism and essays to Cothrom Ùr Bella Caledonia and Dàna. He has had articles published in The Scotsman, The Scottish Express, Am Pàipear and is a regular contributor to Bella Caledonia, who named him one of their top alternative media personalities in 2018. He was the Gaelic editor of the magazine The Poets' Republic for ten issues until 2022 and co-edited their online series, Poets React. Since 2021, he has been the Gaelic Editor of Northwords Now.

== Drama ==
Mac an Tuairneir won the New Gaelic Dramatist award in 2016 at Playwrights' Studio Scotland and Comhairle nan Leabhraichean. He has written three plays.

'Diuchdadh' was performed at Eden Court, Inverness, in March 2016, directed by Mac an Tuairneir himself. The script, written in verse, is his own work. 'Tilleadh' and 'Tioradh' are his other dramas.

== Music ==
Mac an Tuairneir was a member of Trosg, which performed at Celtic Connections, the Belladrum Festival, and many other concerts. In 2016 and 2021, he was an An Comunn Gàidhealach Gold Medal Finalist, where in 2016 he sang 'Cumha an t-Seana Ghàidheal' and 'Cànan nan Gàidheal.' In 2021 he sang 'Òran an t-Saighdear' and 'Cead Deireannach nam Beann' in memory of fellow Edinburgh-based Gaelic Poet, the late Duncan Bàn MacIntyre.

His poetry has been sung by Mary Ann Kennedy, Ainsley Hammill, Malina MacDonald, Rachel Walker and Gillie MacKenzie, among others. Marcas frequently writes songs in partnership with women musicians, notably Mary Ann Kennedy; together, they have composed the following pieces: 'Ainneamhag' for the Inverness Gaelic Choir, which won second place in the Lovat and Tullibardine Awards of 2016; 'Grioglachan', in memory of the late Maggie 'Hearach' MacDonald of Cliar. Marcas also has a successful songwriting partnership with Rachel Walker, with whom he wrote 'Là Luain', 'Tìr is Sàl', 'Beannachd' and 'Òran na Cille'. Marcas has also written songs and composed music alongside Marit Falt, Josie Duncan, Una MacGlone, Adam Holmes, and Padruig Moireasdan. He was a founding member of the LGBT music collective 'Bogha-froise.'

His debut album, Speactram, including self-penned songs and others penned with Nick Turner, Adam Holmes, Gillie Mackenzie, Pàdruig Morrison and Rachel Walker was released by Watercolour Music in July, 2022. The album was longlisted for the Album of the Year Award at the Scots Traditional Music Awards in 2022.

Mac an Tuairneir was a member and Gaelic tutor of the Lothian Gaelic Choir where he sings tenor.

== Media ==
Mac an Tuairneir is a regular contributor on BBC Radio nan Gaidheal and BBC Alba. He appears monthly on Radio nan Gàidheal's 'Feasgar'. Notable TV appearances include the 2018 Trusadh Broadcast 'Leabraichean Gàidhlig'.

== Works ==
=== Books ===
- Mac an Tuairneir, Marcas (2013). Deò. Ochtertyre, Crieff: Grace Note Publications. ISBN 978-1-907676-39-0. (bilingual)
- Lus na Tùise, 2016
- beul-fo-bhonn / heelster-gowdie, 2017
- Dùileach, 2021
- Polaris, 2022
- Cruinneachadh, 2022

=== Singles ===
- "Fichead 's a h-Ochd", 2020
- "Bruidhinn", 2021
- "Nochd", 2021

=== Albums ===
- Speactram, 2022
