= Mark Pawson =

British artist (1964–2025)

- Born: 1964; Strood, Kent, England
- Died: 1 March 2025 (aged 60–61)
- Known for: Artist's books, zines, mail art, DIY publishing
- Notable work: Die-Cut Plug Wiring Diagram Book

Mark Pawson (1964–1 March 2025) was a British artist known for his prolific output of handmade ephemera, artist's books, zines, badges, and prints. A self-described "image junkie" and "photocopier fetishist," Pawson was a central figure in the UK’s DIY art scene and mail art movement, celebrated for his innovative use of low-tech printing methods and his commitment to accessible, affordable art.

== Early life and education ==
Mark Pawson was born in Strood, Kent, England. England, in 1964. His parents June Illingworth and David Pawson moved to Lymm, Cheshire, where he and his brother Daniel and sister Frances were raised. Pawson attended Lymm Grammar School before studying sociology at City University, graduating in 1986. He moved to East London in 1982 and remained based there throughout his life. Pawson did not attend art school, instead developing his practice independently through experimentation and participation in underground art networks.

== Career ==
Pawson discovered mail art in 1980 at the age of 17. He cited Ray Johnson as an influence on his deep involvement with the international mail art network. He began producing artist's books and multiples in the mid-1980s. His work often incorporated recycled materials, rubber stamps, photocopies, and the Japanese Print Gocco system. He was known for organizing “free-stuff” parties and producing humorous, satirical stickers and badges. The author of Badge Button Pin stated that:

"If it contained no work by Mark Pawson, the present volume would be like a book on Italian Renaissance art that makes no mention of Leonardo Da Vinci."

Bookmaker Erica Van Horne stated:

"Over the last thirty years Simon [Cutts] and I did a huge number of book-making workshops. We also made numerous talks and presentations about Coracle books, and about producing and publishing books in general. We never did a presentation without mentioning Mark Pawson."

Pawson's notable publications include:

- Small Plastic Babies (1987)
- Mark's Little Book About Kinder Eggs (1989), which he self-published over 6,000 copies of.
- Eco-frenzy; recycling and ecology symbols (1992)
- Clip-on Plastic Moustaches (1992)
- Die-Cut Plug Wiring Diagram Book (1992)
- The Address Is The Art (2003) an artist's book comprising envelopes Pawson had received in the mail over the course of two decades.

Pawson collaborated with brands such as Tatty Devine and Levi’s Vintage Clothing,. He supplied the cover illustration for the December 1996 issue of Creative Review and was the subject of a four page article. From 1998 to 2012 he contributed a comics and zines review column for Variant magazine.

In 2018, Pawson collaborated with Jess Baines and Tony Credland on "Doing it ourselves: countercultural and alternative radical publishing in the decade before punk." which was published as a chapter in an anthology of works about fanzines by Manchester University Press.

== Exhibitions ==
Pawson exhibited widely in the UK and internationally. Notable exhibitions include:

- Untitled, an installation in which mail received by Pawson was pasted onto the walls of his London home from June 1987 - September 1988.
- A joint show with Ben Allen at Transmission Gallery in Glasgow (1990).
- No New Work a retrospective at Last Chance Saloon, London (1999)
- Metropolis Rise: New Art from London at 798 Space, Beijing (2006)
- Not Quite Disney at Jealous Gallery, London (2024)

== Legacy ==
Pawson's work is held in major collections including:

- British Museum, London
- Tate Gallery Library, London
- National Art Library at the V&A
- University of the Arts, London
- Baltic Centre for Contemporary Art, Gateshead
- MoMA Library, New York
- Yale Center for British Art, Connecticut
- Private collection of Björk

== Death ==
Mark Pawson died of a heart attack in March 2025 at the age of 60. He was widely mourned in the art community, with tributes highlighting his generosity, humor, and influence on generations of DIY and mail artists.
