= The Beginning Was the End =

Pseudoscientific book on the evolution of humans

- The cover of the UK First Edition of The Beginning Was the End. This particular copy has been signed by three members of Devo.
- Author: Oscar Kiss Maerth
- Original title: Der Anfang war das Ende – Der Mensch entstand durch Kannibalismus
- Translator: Judith Hayward
- Language: German (later translated into English)
- Genre: Pseudoscience
- Publication date: West Germany: 1971; United Kingdom/United States: 1 January 1974
- Publication place: West Germany
- Media type: Hardcover
- ISBN: 0-7221-5712-6

The Beginning Was the End is a 1971 pseudo-scientific book written by Oscar Kiss Maerth (8 October 1914 – 26 August 1990) which claims humankind evolved from cannibalistic apes. The book has been criticized in relation to racialist and pseudohistorical claims.

== Background ==
Maerth was a Hungarian-born entrepreneur, philosopher and writer. He studied the living habits of people living close to nature in Southeast Asia. In doing so, he pursued questions about the causes of emergence and development of human beings, their intelligence and behavior.

After emigrating from Hungary to South America, Maerth lived in Hong Kong for many years, later moving with his wife Elisabeth and three children to Lake Como in Northern Italy, where he bought the Villa Passalacqua in Moltrasio. He bequeathed the villa and much of his fortune to the Omnia Mundi Foundation. The foundation was registered in 1975 with SFr50,000 (equivalent to SFr56,079 or US$61,625 in 2021) as initial capital. The foundation was dissolved after the death of the founder.

== Publication ==
Maerth rose to prominence in 1971 as the author of The Beginning was the End, a book he wrote in 1967 in seclusion at the Tsin San Buddhist monastery in Guangdong Province, China. In this book, he advocated the thesis that humans descended from apes, which systematically consumed the brains of their fellow species for many thousands of years. As a result, their brain volume gradually increased. Ultimately, humans came into being through cannibalism.

It was first published in West Germany as Der Anfang war das Ende – Der Mensch entstand durch Kannibalismus (Econ Verlag GmbH, Düsseldorf und Wien, 1971), then translated by Judith Hayward and published in Great Britain by Michael Joseph, Ltd, 1973 and re-issued by Sphere Books, Ltd, London in 1974, ISBN 0-7221-5712-6. It has been translated into eight languages.

== Synopsis ==
The Beginning Was the End claimed that modern humans devolved from a species of brain-eating apes. According to Maerth, this diet increased the apes' brain size, sex drive, and aggression, but suppressed their purported innate psychic ability, eventually causing insanity. Maerth offered no evidence for his theories, basing them largely on his alleged meetings with cannibals in Java and New Guinea and his experiences eating raw ape brains in a restaurant in Southeast Asia. He hints at having activated his latent psychic abilities through altering the shape of his skull in the manner of Incan tribes and/or trepanation, and his theories claimed to be mostly derived from the resulting divine inspiration. The frontispiece of Maerth's book says that after his travels in Asia, South America and Australia he settled in Italy where he lived with his wife and three children on Lake Como, where he was involved in the restoration of Villa Passalacqua. While future volumes were promised in the course of the text, none ever appeared, with the exception of The Speech of Moltrasio, a very rare 8-page pamphlet.

== Criticism ==
The book contains no references whatsoever. Rather, it is based on alleged conversations with present-day cannibals, the eating of ape brain by the author and direct 'insight' from deep meditation. Many parts have been deemed by some as being outright racist, particularly the photographic plates comparing various ethnic faces (primarily Arab and African) to apes. He says that blacks have smaller brains than whites and that contemporary cannibal tribes are seeking to remedy this discrepancy by consuming brains in a frantic attempt to catch up, though he estimates that it would take them roughly 100,000 years to do so.

== Popular culture ==
The book's legacy comes largely from the new wave band Devo, who incorporated several elements of the book into their concept of "de-evolution" and even adopted the book's title for their short film, In the Beginning was the End: The Truth About De-evolution. Bassist/synth player/vocalist Gerald V. Casale said of the book, "It's a better story than the Bible as far as DEVO's concerned." The cover of the 1989 album Now It Can Be Told is based on the cover of the US paperback edition.

== See also ==
- Artificial cranial deformation
- Devolution (biology)
- Lamarckism
- Man into Wolf
- Monkey brains (cuisine)
- Polygenism
- Stanisław Szukalski
- Trepanation
- Zermatism
