= Mathematical Cranks =

1992 book by Underwood Dudley

- Author: Underwood Dudley
- Language: English
- Series: MAA Spectrum
- Genre: Non-fiction
- Publisher: Mathematical Association of America
- Publication date: 1992
- Publication place: United States
- ISBN: 0-88385-507-0

Mathematical Cranks is a book on pseudomathematics and the cranks who create it, written by Underwood Dudley. It was published by the Mathematical Association of America in their MAA Spectrum book series in 1992 (ISBN 0-88385-507-0).

== Topics ==
Previously, Augustus De Morgan wrote in A Budget of Paradoxes about cranks in multiple subjects, and Dudley wrote a book about angle trisection. However, this book is the first to focus on mathematical crankery as a whole.

The book consists of 57 essays, loosely organized by the most common topics in mathematics for cranks to focus their attention on. The "top ten" of these topics, as listed by reviewer Ian Stewart, are, in order:

1. Squaring the circle
2. Angle trisection
3. Fermat's Last Theorem
4. Non-Euclidean geometry and the parallel postulate
5. The golden ratio
6. Perfect numbers
7. The four color theorem
8. Advocacy for duodecimal and other non-standard number systems
9. Cantor's diagonal argument for the uncountability of the real numbers
10. Doubling the cube

Other common topics for crankery, collected by Dudley, include calculations for the perimeter of an ellipse, roots of quintic equations, Fermat's little theorem, Gödel's incompleteness theorems, Goldbach's conjecture, magic squares, divisibility rules, constructible polygons, twin primes, set theory, statistics, and the Van der Pol oscillator.

As David Singmaster writes, many of these topics are the subject of mainstream mathematics "and only become crankery in extreme cases". The book omits or passes lightly over other topics that apply mathematics to crankery in other areas, such as numerology and pyramidology. Its attitude towards the cranks it covers is one of "sympathy and understanding", and in order to keep the focus on their crankery it names them only by initials. The book also attempts to analyze the motivation and psychology behind crankery, and to provide advice to professional mathematicians on how to respond to cranks.

Despite his work on the subject, which has "become enshrined in academic folklore", Dudley has stated "I've been at this for a decade and still can't pin down exactly what it is that makes a crank a crank", adding that "It's like obscenity – you can tell a crank when you see one."

== Lawsuit ==
After the book was published, one of the cranks whose work was featured in the book, William Dilworth, sued Dudley for defamation in a federal court in Wisconsin. The court dismissed the Dilworth vs Dudley case on two grounds. First, it found that by publishing his work on Cantor's diagonal argument, Dilworth had made himself a public figure, creating a higher burden of proof for a defamation case. Second, it found that the word "crank" was "rhetorical hyperbole" rather than an actionably inaccurate description. The United States Court of Appeals for the Seventh Circuit concurred. After Dilworth repeated the lawsuit in a state court, he lost again and was forced to pay Dudley's legal expenses.

== Reception and audience ==
Reviewer John N. Fujii calls the book "humorous and charming" and "difficult to put down", and advocates it to "all readers interested in the human side of mathematics". Although complaining that famous mathematicians Niels Henrik Abel and Srinivasa Ramanujan might have been dismissed as cranks by the standards of the book, reviewer Robert Matthews finds it an accurate reflection of most crankery. And David Singmaster adds that it should be read by "anyone likely to deal with a crank", including professional mathematicians, journalists, and legislators.
