= Aggressive Christianity Missionary Training Corps =

Cult

Aggressive Christianity Missionary Training Corps
- Abbreviation: ACMTC
- Type: Christian new religious movement
- Classification: Christian fundamentalist
- Theology: Biblicist
- Structure: Hierarchical
- General: Deborah Green (arrested)
- Region: United States (New Mexico)
- Language: English
- Headquarters: Fence Lake, New Mexico
- Founder: James and Deborah Green
- Origin: 1981; Sacramento, California
- Separated from: Salvation Army (1981)
- Ministry: 1
- Other names: Holy Tribal Nation; Free Love Ministries; Life Force Team (all formerly)
- Official website: Aggressive Christianity Missionary Training Corps

The Aggressive Christianity Missions Training Corps (abbreviated ACMTC; also known as the Holy Tribal Nation, the Free Love Ministries, or the Life Force Team) is a militant Christian fundamentalist cult. The ministry, founded in 1981 by James and Deborah Green (sometimes collectively referred to as the Generals; James is often called General James and sometimes Jim; Deborah is referred to as General Deborah, formerly Lila), still retains its military structure, partially based on the original pattern of the Salvation Army.

ACMTC's starting location was Sacramento, California, and it finally settled east of the rural town of Fence Lake, in Cibola County, New Mexico, 60 miles (97 km) south of Gallup.

In August 2017, Deborah Green and her son-in-law Peter Green were arrested on charges of sexual abuse of children. Peter Green, a manager at the ministry's Fence Lake location, was charged with 100 counts of criminal sexual penetration of a child, while Deborah Green faced charges of child abuse, negligent abuse and criminal sexual penetration. Deborah Green's son Joshua Green was also arrested and charged with failure to register the birth of his son.

Four other members of the ministry in New Mexico, Amos River, Victoria River, Ruth River and Timothy River, were also arrested in August 2017 on felony charges of failure to register the births of their 11 children. The New Mexico Children, Youth, and Families Department also investigated the ACMTC organization.

In September 2018, Deborah Green was sentenced to 72 years in prison after being convicted of child rape, kidnapping and child abuse. She was later released on January 28, 2022, following a complete dismissal of her charges. On April 21, 2025, the New Mexico Supreme Court reinstated her child abuse conviction, finding that evidence "directly implicated Defendant in the commission of the crime."

James Green pleaded no contest to child abuse charges and in December 2018 was sentenced to ten years in prison. As of 2025, the New Mexico Corrections Department listed him as released to probation/parole with Offender ID# 526955.

== Background ==
=== James Green ===
James Green was born in 1945 and was raised in Kentucky. As a teenager, he hitchhiked to California where he later became involved in a hippie lifestyle and the 1960s counterculture, and met Deborah.

=== Montana prayer ===
During the Greens' time with the Bear Tribe in California, they went to scout out land in Montana. The Greens underwent in 1971 a process which they defined as "Conversion to Christianity" - since, as they regarded it in the aftermath, they had not been true Christians before.

=== Kentucky ===
The Greens moved to Kentucky, where they started attending a local church. James soon began training for a ministerial position under a pastor, which lasted for four years.

After a missionary journey through Central America, the Greens ended up in Miami, Florida.

=== Salvation Army, Miami ===
In the late 1970s, James and Deborah worked at the large Miami Salvation Army center, participating in inner-city mission work. ACMTC may have taken its name from a sermon by Salvation Army co-founder Catherine Booth titled "Aggressive Christianity".

== Ministry ==
=== Free Love Ministries / Life Force Team ===
In the early 1980s, the Greens moved into a house in Sacramento, California. The Greens' public ministry started out as the Greens taking people in, as well as printing and distributing Gospel tracts. ACMTC eventually secured more houses and started using the name "Free Love Ministries".

=== Lawsuit ===
In 1988, Maura Schmierer and several others filed a lawsuit against Free Love Ministries for abusive treatment, seeking 20 million dollars in damages.

The Greens lost the case by not appearing in court and went on the run from the law. The court ordered ACMTC to pay Schmierer $1.02 million. After losing the lawsuit, all buildings they owned were seized by the court. The ministry destroyed the buildings, left Sacramento and settled in Klamath Falls, Oregon, and added another ministry name, "Death Force Team".

In 1993, ACMTC secured an old school building in Berino, and established another camp in Gallup, New Mexico.

== Beliefs and practices ==
The group was founded as a Christian communal group when it was founded as Free Love Ministries.

=== Primary beliefs ===
In their 1987 "Responsibilities of Command" officer's manual, the ministry states its beliefs:

We Believe:

- In the divine inspiration of the Bible (2nd Tim. 3:16).
- That in the One God there are three persons, the Father, the Son, and the Holy Ghost (1 John 5:7).
- That Jesus Christ is the Lord God Almighty, Creator of all things (John 1:1-3, 14, 29-34; Rev. 1:5, 6)
- In the virgin birth (Luke 1:26-35)
- That Jesus Christ died for our sins (Hebrews 9:15, 22, 28).
- In the baptism of the Holy Ghost with evidence of speaking in tongues (Acts 2:4).
- All the supernatural gifts (healing, miracles, deliverance, tongues etc.), and practicing them (1 Cor. 12).

The ministry also states its spiritual beliefs that can be found in some of the earliest writings done in 1986 by James Green,

(1) His grace is demonstrated that we might be free from captivity, but this freedom is to be used for and unto His ultimate intention.

(2) God always asks that which is impossible to the natural man in order that His people will be dependent upon divine, spiritual resources. (3) God designs all things to function properly under His control. He is not content to merely set us free, but longs to "turn our capacity"; that is, He longs to bring us back into His captivity. (4) Man must either submit to God's purpose or become captive to some other law. God's plan will not allow us to live long in liberty apart from law.

(5) God's pattern is not spurts of consecration and dedication, but a consistent walk leading into a continuous unfolding revelation of His plan and purpose.

== Criminal prosecution ==
In September 2018, Deborah Green was sentenced to 72 years in prison after being convicted of "kidnapping, criminal sexual penetration of a minor and child abuse", and James Green pleaded no contest to child abuse charges and in December 2018 was sentenced to ten years in prison. Other leaders accused of the same crimes are awaiting trial.

In June 2021, Sarah Green, the daughter of Deborah and Jim, detailed how she escaped her mother's cult in 1999. Sarah was instrumental in helping to put her parents in jail.

Deborah was released on January 28, 2022, following a complete dismissal of her charges, though the judge said that her case could be brought back to trial. On April 21, 2025, the New Mexico Supreme Court reinstated Deborah Green's child abuse conviction, stating that the lower court's decision "was incompatible with a finding of actual innocence. Far from exonerative in nature, the district court's unchallenged causation finding directly implicated Defendant in the commission of the crime." As of 2026 there is a warrant for Deborah Green's arrest; her whereabouts are unknown.

James Green pleaded no contest to child abuse charges and in December 2018 was sentenced to ten years in prison. As of 2025, the New Mexico Corrections Department lists James Green as released to probation/parole with Offender ID# 526955.

== In the media ==
Aggressive Christianity Missionary Training Corps has been described as a cult.

Apologetics Index says of the group:

While it presents itself as a Christian movement it has a number of un-biblical and extra-biblical teachings, including several that militate against the Bible’s teachings on grace. It has an elitist view of itself and its members. It encourages unreasonable corporal punishment for children, and reportedly prevents members from seeking medical aid.

In 1989, Jodi Hernandez was part of a group of newspeople that reported on the Aggressive Christians from March to September through KOVR-TV, CBS channel 13 Sacramento.

In December 1999, Darren White, former secretary of the Department of Public Safety for New Mexico, and then reporter for KRQE, CBS channel 13, Albuquerque, reported on the Greens.

On November 4, 2005, Jim Maniaci, of the Gallup Independent's Cibola County Bureau in Grants, reported that a co-leader of a religious group was jailed on an aggravated battery with a deadly weapon charge.

In June 2006, Annie McCormick of KRQE, CBS channel 13, Albuquerque, also investigated the Greens with reports from former members and families.

In April 2012, the National Geographic Channel featured the accounts of Maura Schmierer, and of her daughter Rebekah, of their experiences with the group.

Season 2, episode 4 of Dangerous Persuasions on Investigation Discovery Channel tells Maura Schmierer's story.

In 2023, episode 2 of Cult Justice, called "The Generals" featured ACMTC and included a personal interview with Deborah Green.
