= Pseudomathematics =

Work of mathematical cranks

Squaring the circle: the areas of this square and circle are both equal to π. It was proved in 1882 that this figure cannot be constructed in a finite number of steps with an idealized straightedge and compass. Nevertheless, "proofs" of such constructions were still published even 50 years later.

Pseudomathematics, or mathematical crankery, is a mathematics-like activity that does not adhere to the framework of rigor of formal mathematical practice. Common areas of pseudomathematics are solutions of problems proved to be unsolvable or recognized as extremely hard by experts, as well as attempts to apply mathematics to non-quantifiable areas. A person engaging in pseudomathematics is called a pseudomathematician or a pseudomath. Pseudomathematics has equivalents in other scientific fields, and may overlap with other topics characterized as pseudoscience.

Pseudomathematics often contains mathematical fallacies whose executions are tied to elements of deceit rather than genuine, unsuccessful attempts at tackling a problem. Excessive pursuit of pseudomathematics can result in the practitioner being labelled a crank. Because it is based on non-mathematical principles, pseudomathematics is not related to misguided attempts at genuine proofs. Indeed, such mistakes are common in the careers of amateur mathematicians, some of whom go on to produce celebrated results.

The topic of mathematical crankery has been extensively studied by mathematician Underwood Dudley, who has written several popular works about mathematical cranks and their ideas.

== Examples ==
One common type of approach is claiming to have solved a classical problem that has been proven to be mathematically unsolvable. Common examples of this include the following constructions in Euclidean geometry – using only a compass and straightedge:

- Squaring the circle: Given any circle, drawing a square having the same area.
- Doubling the cube: Given any cube, drawing a cube with twice its volume.
- Trisecting the angle: Given any angle, dividing it into three smaller angles all of the same size.

For more than 2,000 years, many people had tried and failed to find such constructions; in the 19th century they were all proven impossible.

Similarly, mathematical cranks are also known for claiming solutions to problems regarded as extremely difficult by experts, or well-known open problems that are often simple to state, such as the odd perfect number problem, the twin prime conjecture, Goldbach's conjecture, the Collatz conjecture, as well as Millennium problems such as the Riemann hypothesis or the P = NP problem. One notable case were "Fermatists", who bombarded mathematical institutions with requests to check their proofs of Fermat's Last Theorem.

Another common approach by mathematical cranks is to misapprehend standard mathematical methods, and to insist that the use or knowledge of higher mathematics is somehow cheating or misleading (e.g., the denial of Cantor's diagonal argument or Gödel's incompleteness theorems).

== History ==
The term pseudomath was coined by the logician Augustus De Morgan, discoverer of De Morgan's laws, in his A Budget of Paradoxes (1872). De Morgan wrote:

The pseudomath is a person who handles mathematics as the monkey handled the razor. The creature tried to shave himself as he had seen his master do; but, not having any notion of the angle at which the razor was to be held, he cut his own throat. He never tried a second time, poor animal! but the pseudomath keeps on at his work, proclaims himself clean-shaved, and all the rest of the world hairy.

De Morgan named James Smith as an example of a pseudomath who claimed to have proved that π is exactly 3 1/8. Of Smith, De Morgan wrote: "He is beyond a doubt the ablest head at unreasoning, and the greatest hand at writing it, of all who have tried in our day to attach their names to an error." The term pseudomath was adopted later by Tobias Dantzig. Dantzig observed:

With the advent of modern times, there was an unprecedented increase in pseudomathematical activity. During the 18th century, all scientific academies of Europe saw themselves besieged by circle-squarers, trisectors, duplicators, and perpetuum mobile designers, loudly clamoring for recognition of their epoch-making achievements. In the second half of that century, the nuisance had become so unbearable that, one by one, the academies were forced to discontinue the examination of the proposed solutions.

The term pseudomathematics has been applied to attempts in mental and social sciences to quantify the effects of what is typically considered to be qualitative. More recently, the same term has been applied to creationist attempts to refute the theory of evolution, by way of spurious arguments purportedly based in probability or complexity theory, such as intelligent design proponent William Dembski's concept of specified complexity.

== See also ==
- 0.999..., often fallaciously claimed to be distinct from 1
- Indiana Pi Bill
- Mathematical fallacy
- List of incomplete proofs
- Pseudoscience
