= Tanzie Well =

Coordinates: 55°36′35.7″N 4°39′41.6″W

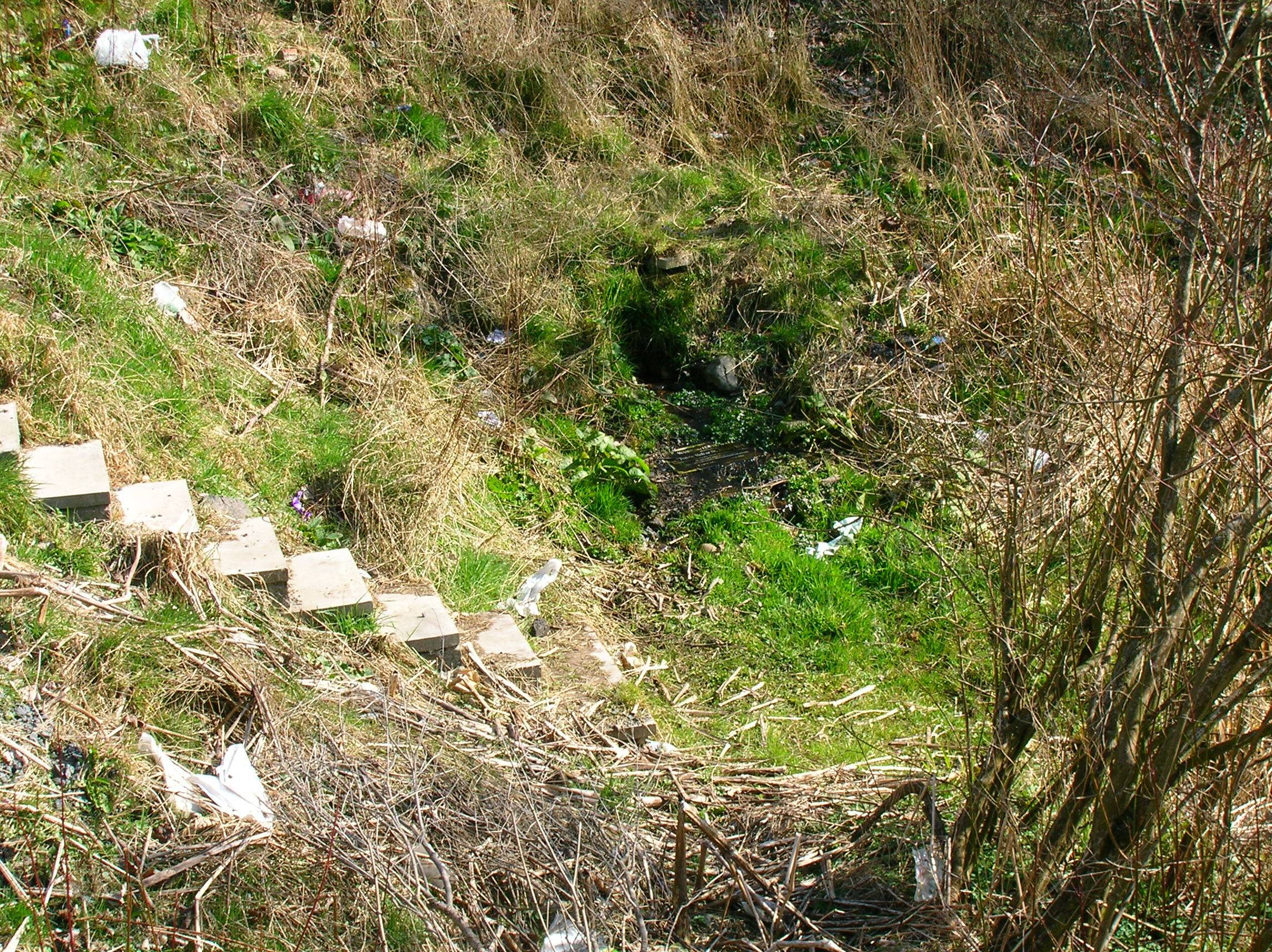
The Tanzie Well

The Tanzie Well, also known as Saint Anne's Well, the Washing House Well or the Spoot is located beside the River Irvine (NS 32448 38361) in the Golf-fields or Golffields (pronounced 'Go-fields') at the end of the footbridge across the River Irvine in Irvine, North Ayrshire, Scotland. It has been suggested that 'Tanzie' may be a corruption of St Inan's Well. The old Irvine Pouther House of 1801 is located nearby.

Location of the Tanzie Well, Irvine, North Ayrshire

== Description ==
The River Irvine and the site of the Tanzie Well in 1870.

The well, spring or spout is located below the embankment of the footpath near to the River Irvine footbridge and is accessed by concrete slab steps. The well has a plaque recording its name and basic history as installed in 1994 by the Irvine Development Corporation (IDC). A stone-lined culvert carries the outflow down to the River Irvine. The relatively abundant flow comes directly from the ground without any discernible pipe or culvert. The well water is first collected in a concrete cistern and then piped down to the springs exit. Previously a cast iron stand pipe was located at the site and the water could be collected from this for personal use.

Writing in 2008 of the 1940s, Elis White said that the well, spring, or spoot had the purest, clearest water and as far as I know came when Scott’s Loch up around Knadgerhill was drained to run into the river at various places. In any case, it was a popular drink for invalids and it was a common sight for us to see people walking away from it carrying a bottle of the water from it. Even a jug in earlier days, and I well remember going to it as a wee lassie along with my father to take some to my Granny in Townhead.

The Ordnance Survey maps shows that the land above the well was part of the Golf Fields. The maps also show a significant historical continuity of woodland at the well site, running down to the other holy well, the Chapel Well, suggested also by the presence of plants indicative of old woodlands such as bluebells, red campion Silene dioica, etc.

The aforementioned plaque installed by the Irvine Development Corporation in 1984 records that the capped 'Washing House' well was uncovered when the footpath was being constructed, a masonry cistern covered with an old grave stone being discovered. Until recently a pipe carried water out through a brick face however this was destroyed by a utility company and never restored despite local calls for it to be restored.

== History ==
=== The Washing House ===
In 1749 a building for washing and bleaching was built near the Tanzie Well by the Irvine town council with dimensions 35 by 15 feet. Aitken's map of 1829 records that this site was a bleachfield. The 1856 25" OS Map shows the bleachfield and wash house with the roughly circular well below it, each approached by a separate path. In 1895 the path to the well runs instead to the wash house which no longer has a bleach field. By 1908 the wash house is still present, but no longer annotated as such. The 1938 OS map shows that the wash house had been demolished by this time. Strawhorn records the wash house was demolished in 1924 and that Provost Hogg ensured that the slates were used to restore the Powder House.

=== The Tanzie Well ===
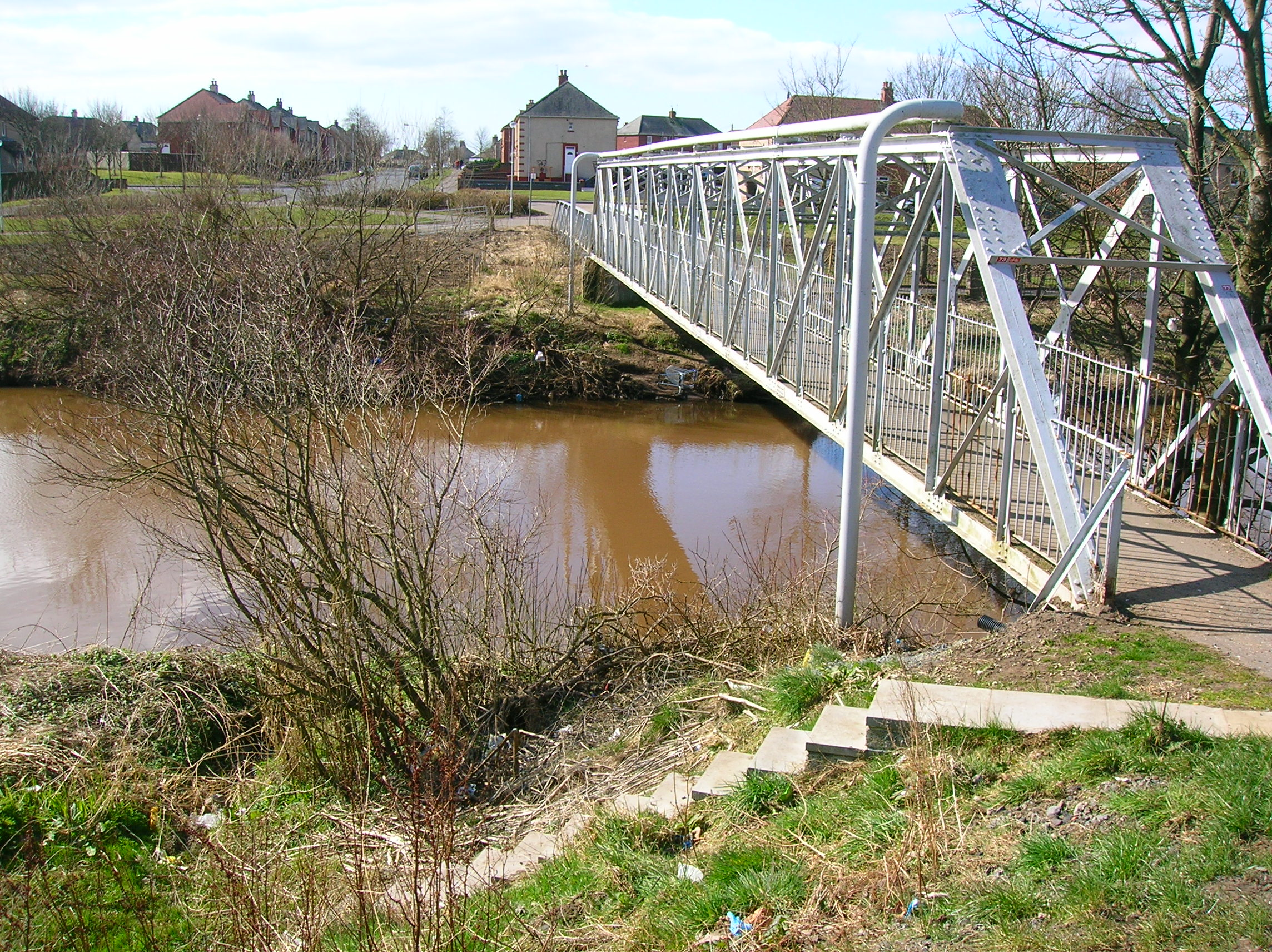
The site of the Tanzie Well beside the River Irvine.

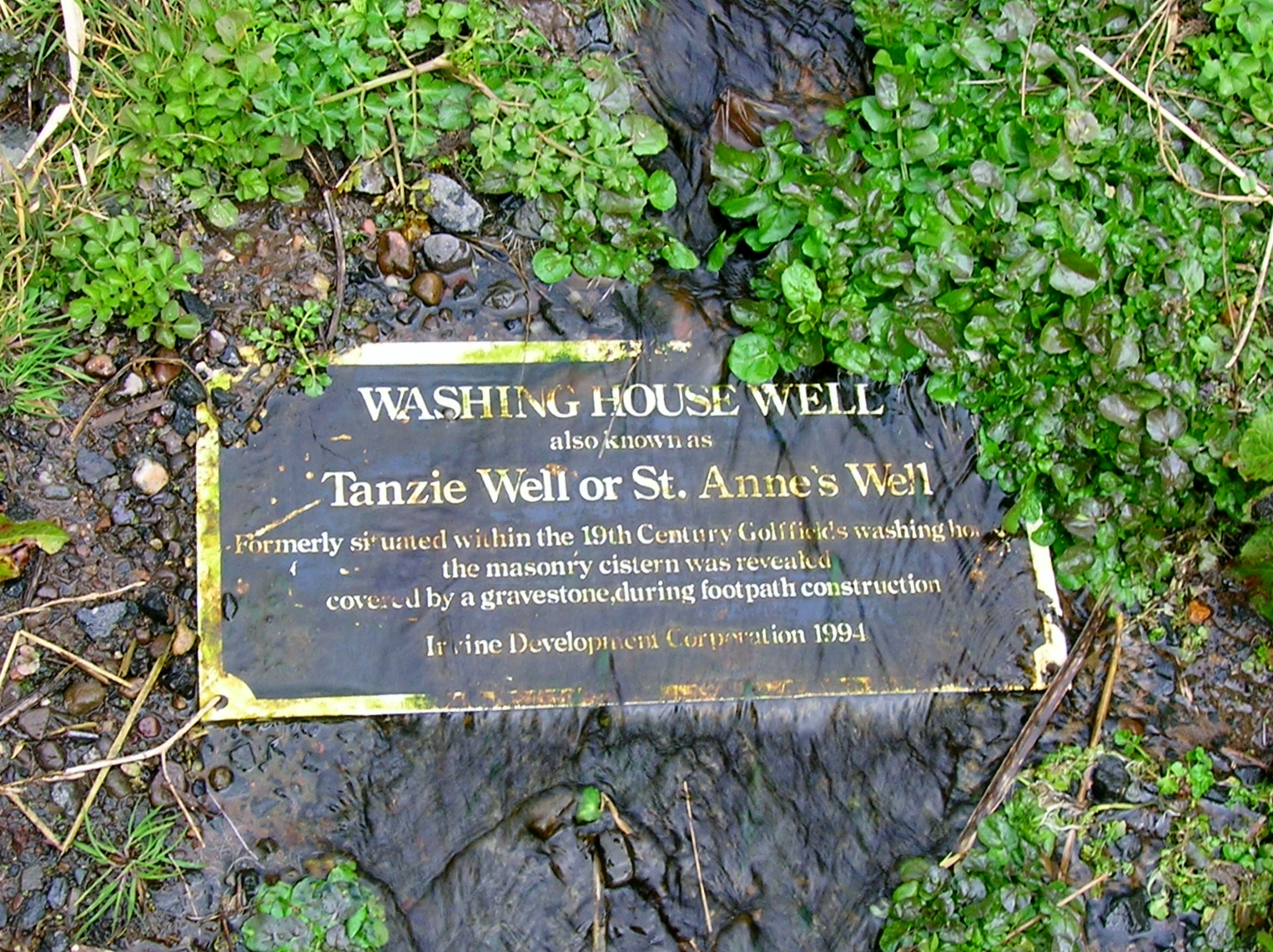
The plaque placed on the well by Irvine Development Corporation in 1994.

This well is noted on the 1856 OS map as accessed by a path that divides from the lane leading to the washing house shortly after entering the Golf Field. No indication is given, but the water supplying the well and washing house may have the same source, however as the well was still in use the waste water from the washing house would have a different outflow so as not to pollute the well water.

In 1895 the well is still marked, however no path leads to it and the path that did now only runs to the wash house. In 1908 the well is still present and marked as such, but without any paths leading to it, however by 1938 the well is not marked and only the outflow culvert to the river is indicated.

=== Saint Anne's or Inan's Well ===
The name 'Tanzie' could be a corruption of St Anne or St Inan. A Saint Inan's is associated with Irvine and a well named for him once existed in Fullarton, south of the present harbour. Dundonald Castle also once had a chapel dedicated to Saint Inan who is otherwise mainly associated with Beith.

== Natural history ==
Typical wetland plants are present at the site such as hemlock water dropwort as well as species only found in clean constantly running water like as watercress. Also noted at the site are green figwort, brooklime speedwell, wild angelica, opposite-leaved golden saxifrage, green alkanet, reed canarygrass, giant hogweed, bishopweed, celandine, and Himalayan balsam.

== See also ==
- Irvine
- Beith
- River Irvine
- Saint Inan
- The Chapel Well
