= The Chapel Well =

Coordinates: 55°36′40.7″N 4°39′52.1″W

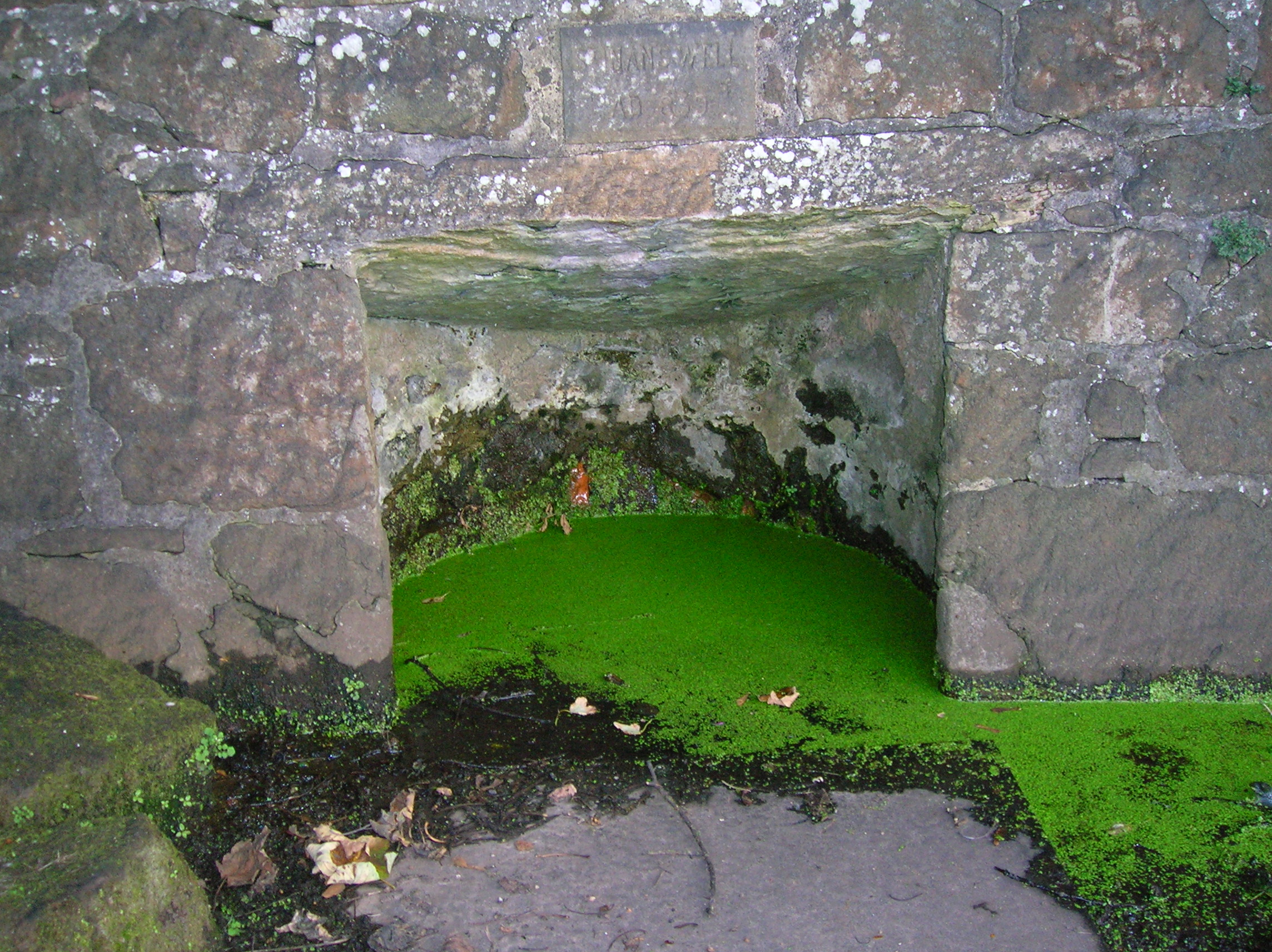
The Chapel Well

The Chapel Well, sometimes known as Saint Mary's Well or probably erroneously as 'Saint Inan's Well', is located beside the River Irvine at the end of the Chapel Lane path that links to the Kirk Vennel in Irvine, North Ayrshire. (NS 32268 38518), Scotland.

Location of the Chapel Well, Irvine, North Ayrshire

== Description ==
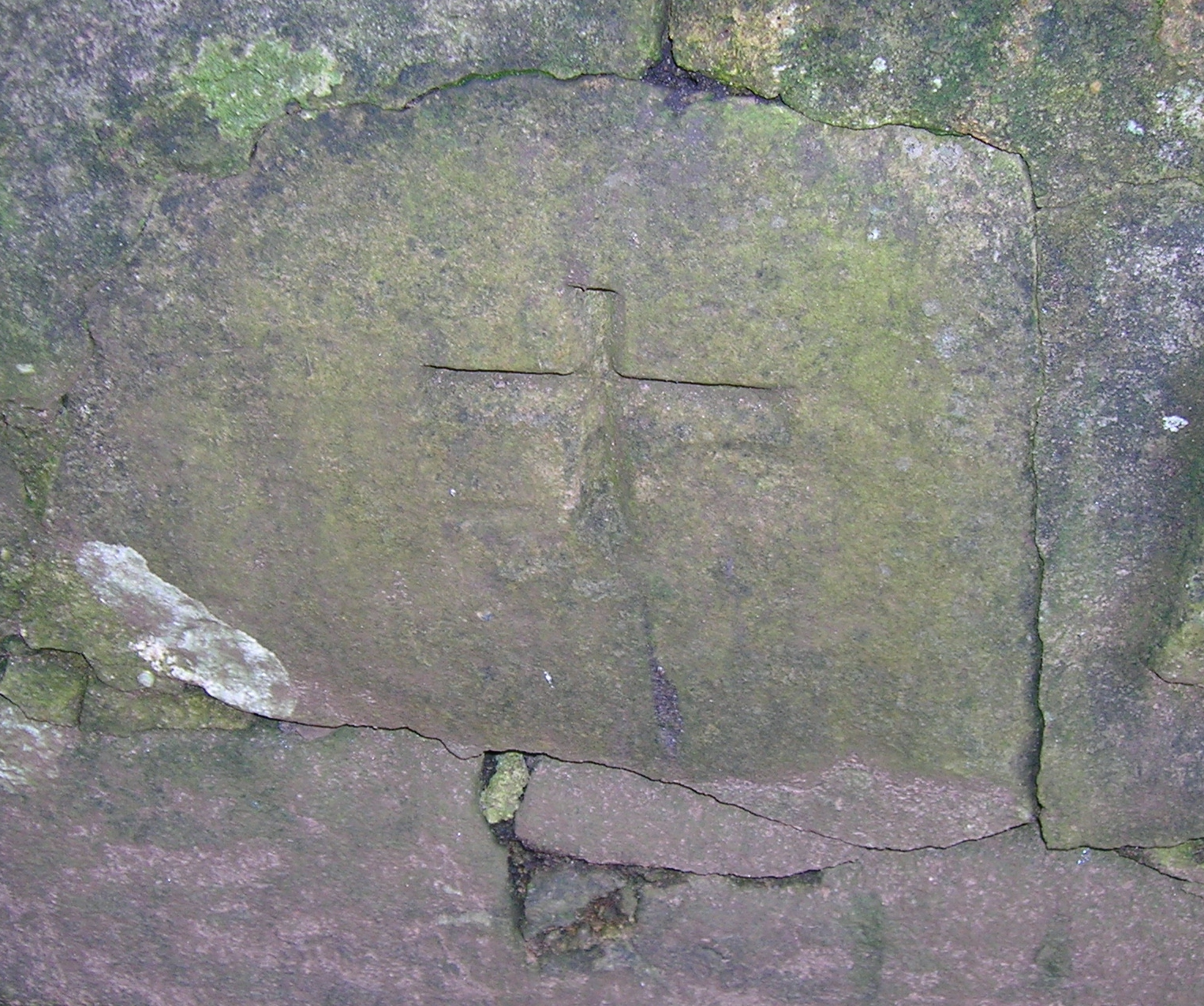
Stone with a carved cross located near the well in the Chapel Lane's boundary wall.

The well or spring is set into the wall of Chapel Lane that runs down from the Kirk Vennel and ends at the bank of the River Irvine. The well has a carved stone plaque above the stone lintel that states 'St Inan's Well AD839.' The well is shallow and set in a semi-circular alcove with a slanting stone roof and base. The spring seeps in through the bedrock at the back of the well. The well has been casually used as wishing well with coins visible that have been thrown in for luck. The well is 85 cm wide at the entrance and 100 cm wide internally. The depth is 90 cm and the water depth is a maximum of 50 cm.

The wall near the well is much higher than elsewhere, appearing like an old gable end.

The Ordnance Survey maps show that the old church glebe was replaced by a new cemetery and the land above the well was part of the Golf Fields until a manse was built here. The maps also show a significant historical continuity of woodland above the well that is also suggested by the presence of plants indicative of old woodlands such as bluebells.

== History ==
=== The Chapel Well ===
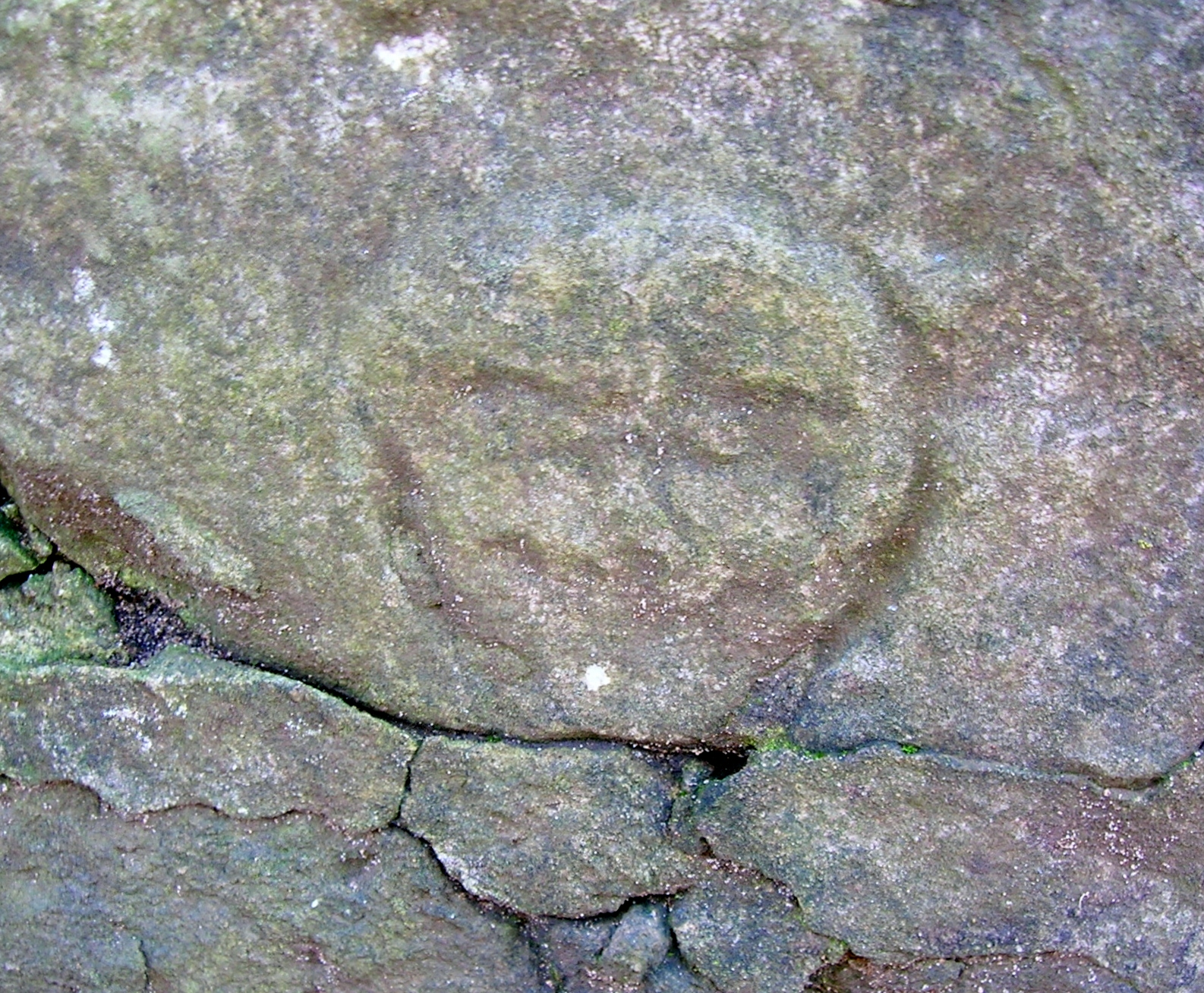
Carved face on the nearby wall in the Chapel Lane.

This well is noted as 'Chapel Well' and is given the alternative name of 'St Mary's Well'. It stood close to the supposed site of Saint Mary's Chapel. The engraved stone plaque above the well states 'St Inan's Well AD 839' and was placed here by the Irvine Burns Club.

The well was used in the 18th century for the washing of clothes. In the 1830s the only well thought suitable for obtaining 'Tea Water' was the Chapel Well, an epidemic of cholera threatened the population of Irvine at the time.

In 1763 the council purchased the land of chapel with its well from William Allan. A little wash house was included in the purchase, situated on the site of the chapel near the well.

Saint Inan's is associated with Irvine and a well named for him once existed in Fullarton, south of the present harbour. Dundonald Castle once had a chapel dedicated to Saint Inan. The erroneous identification of this well as Saint Inan's Well may date from the carved stone plaque being installed.

The well is recorded as having been capped with concrete in 1954.

In 2013 the site was renovated by the Redburn Activity Agreement Group led by the North Ayrshire Ranger Service. On 25 September 2013 the Reverend Robert Travers re-dedicated the holy well in a ceremony attended by representatives from Glebe Primary School, the Redburn Activity Agreement Group and the NAC Ranger Service.

=== Saint Mary's Chapel ===
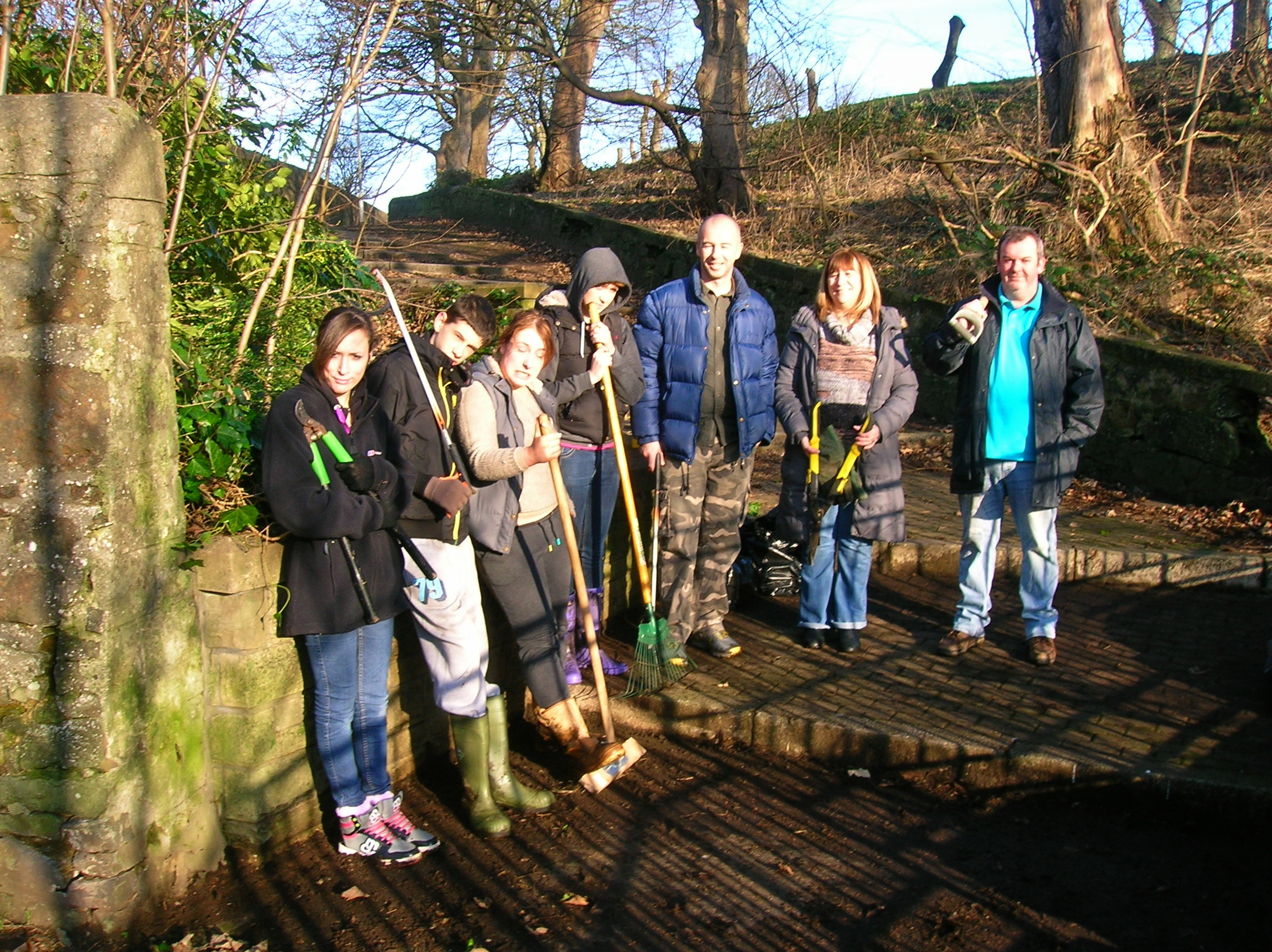
The Redburn Activity Agreement Group renovating the Chapel Well site in 2013.

A pre-reformation chapel dedicated to the Virgin Mary stood on the bank of the River Irvine, below the present churchyard. A grant to it was confirmed in 1471-2. Remains of the chapel have been found and there were also parts of an old wall above the surface, however no trace now remains. These remains were probably of the chapel. however a convent also once existed in the area. The name of the nearby Chapel Well lends support to the view that a chapel dedicated to St. Mary once stood here.

The chapel is of an unknown date and it may have been older than the early Irvine church. The church and chapel certainly existed side by side in the fifteenth century as the foundation received financial support from the same endowment made to the parish church by Dame Alicia Cambell of Loudoun in 1446.

When the field near the chapel was purchased by the Town Council in 1761 a digging operation was undertaken during which foundations of walls were uncovered and these are likely to have been those of the chapel.

==== Carvings near the Chapel Well ====
Five stones bearing crosses were located in the wall near the Chapel Well in recent times however one is now missing and another two now lie below the present day ground level. These crosses may once have marked the extent of church land as boundary markers, however some association with the old chapel cannot be completely ruled out. A carved face is also present and some vague markings on two other stones.

=== The Grannie Stane ===
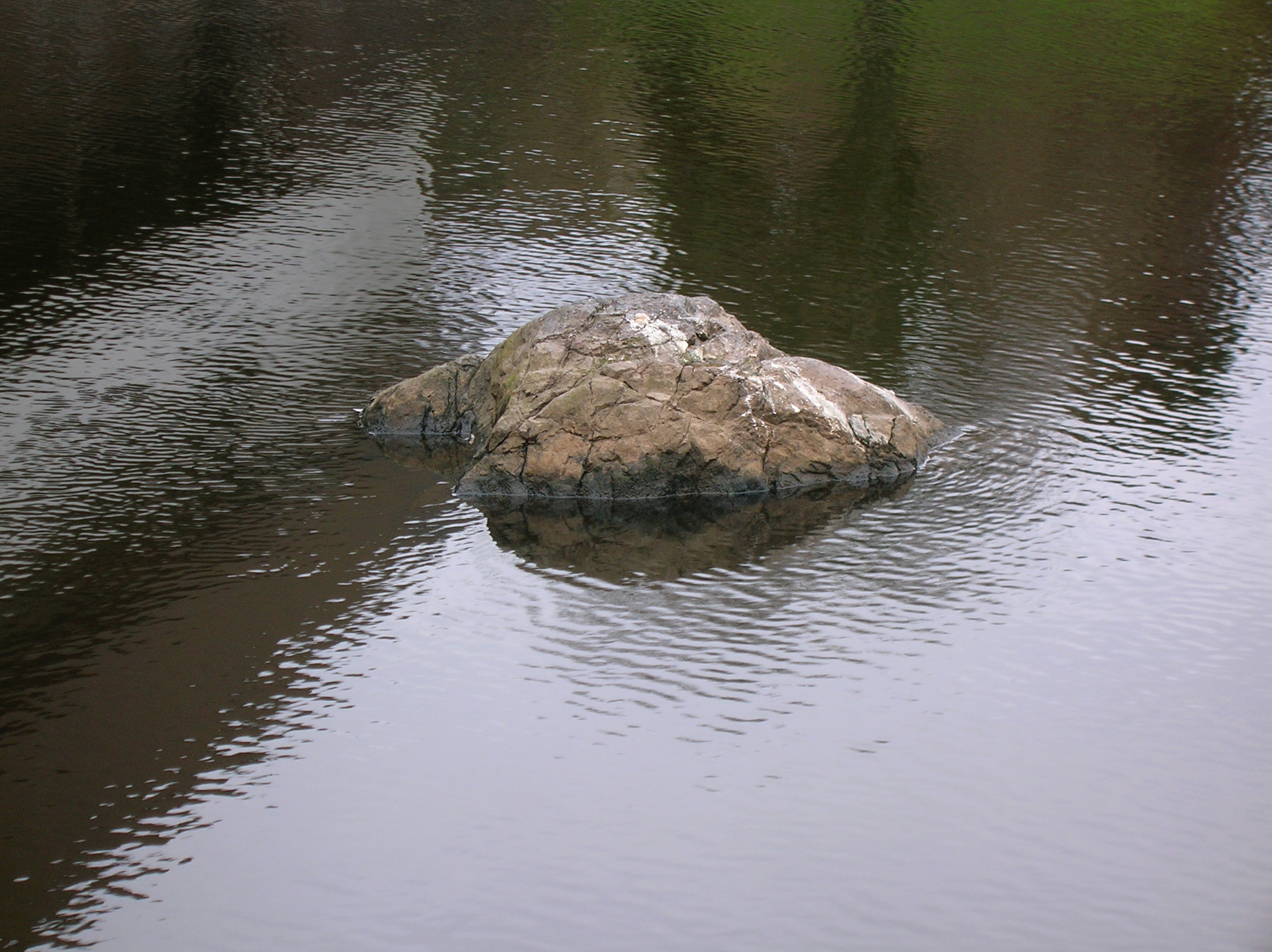
The Grannie Stone in the River Irvine

The Grannie Stane or Stone lies a short distance away from the Chapel Well. This large stone is either simply a glacial erratic left behind from the Ice Age or is the last remaining stone of a stone circle - others were removed, by blasting in 1897 and 1899, after the Irvine weir was constructed in 1895, but popular protests saved this remaining stone. The positioning of the chapel and well near to a stone circle would fit in with the well known practice of supplanting pagan sites with Christian sites.

=== Chapelford ===
The weir of 1895 raised the water level and the site of the old Chapelford that crossed the river at this location was lost.

== Micro-history ==
The Chapel foundations were disturbed when the Riverside Walkway was under construction in the 1980s. A small jetty was located nearby for a boat to tie up and a path with steps ran through the wood. The fishing rights here are held by the landowner.

== See also ==
- Irvine
- Beith
- River Irvine
- Saint Inan
- Tanzie Well
