= Trindlemoss Loch =

Coordinates: 55°37′8.5″N 4°39′42.0″W

Trindlemoss Loch or Scott's Loch
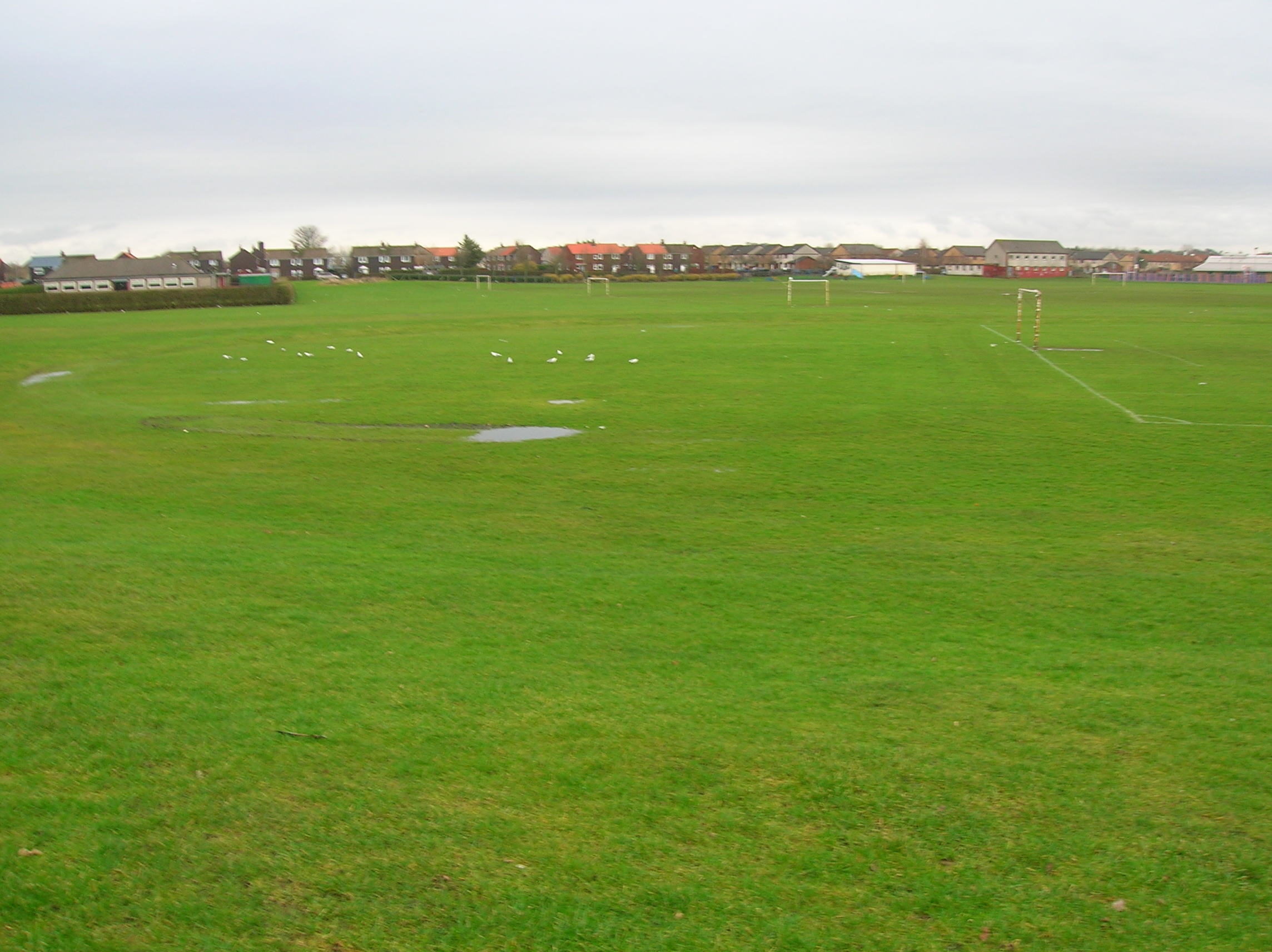
- Trindlemoss Loch site

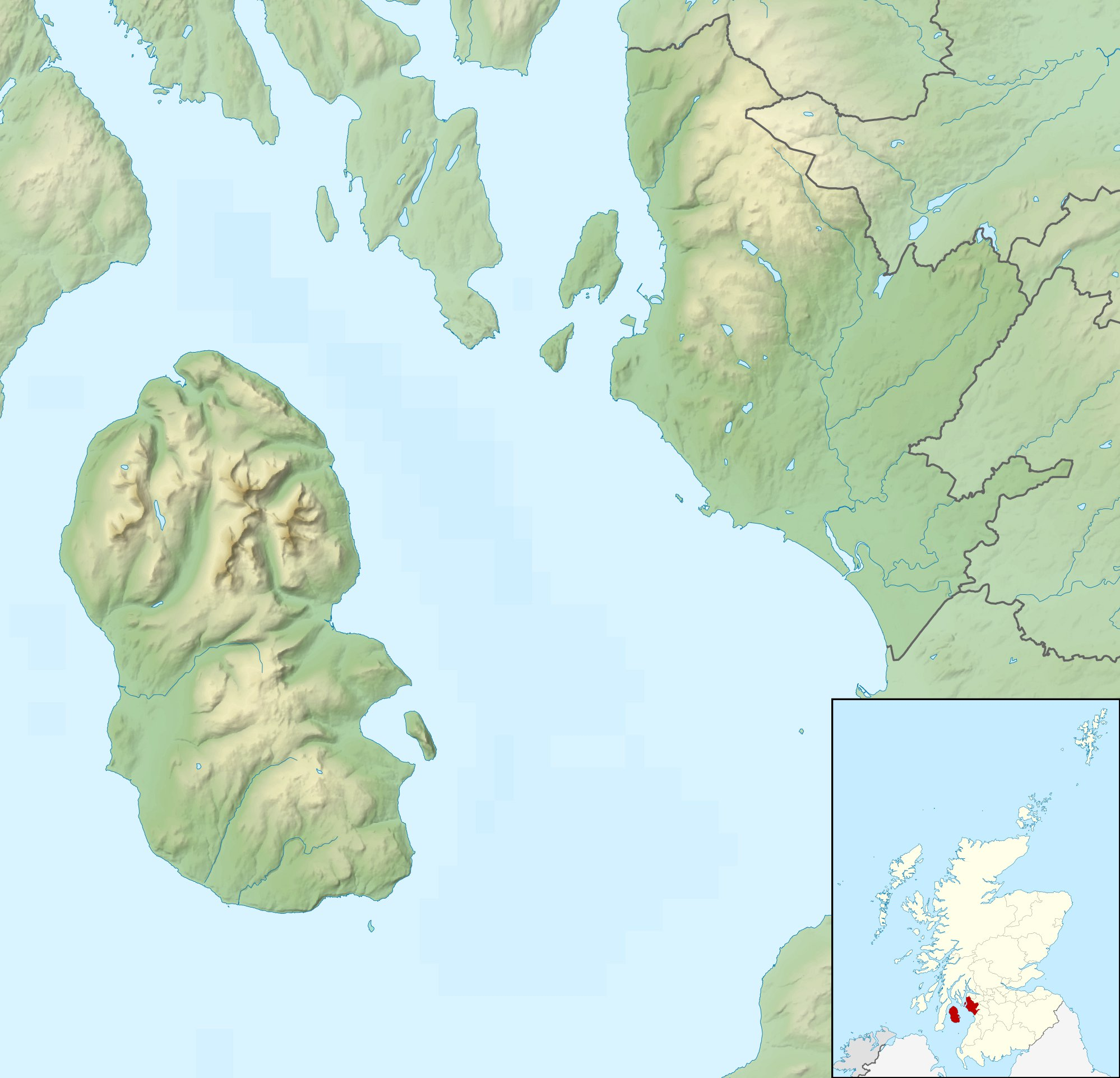
- Location within North Ayrshire
- Location: Irvine, North Ayrshire, Scotland
- Type: Drained freshwater loch
- Primary inflows: Rainfall and drainage
- Primary outflows: To the Annick Water
- Basin countries: Scotland
- Islands: None
- Settlements: Irvine

Trindlemoss Loch, Scott's / Scot's Loch or the Loch of Irvine was situated in a low-lying area running from Ravenspark to near Stanecastle and down to Lockwards, now represented only by the playing fields off Bank Street in the Parish of Irvine, North Ayrshire, Scotland. The loch was natural, sitting in a hollow created by glaciation. The loch waters were progressively drained and in 1691 this was finally achieved.

== History ==
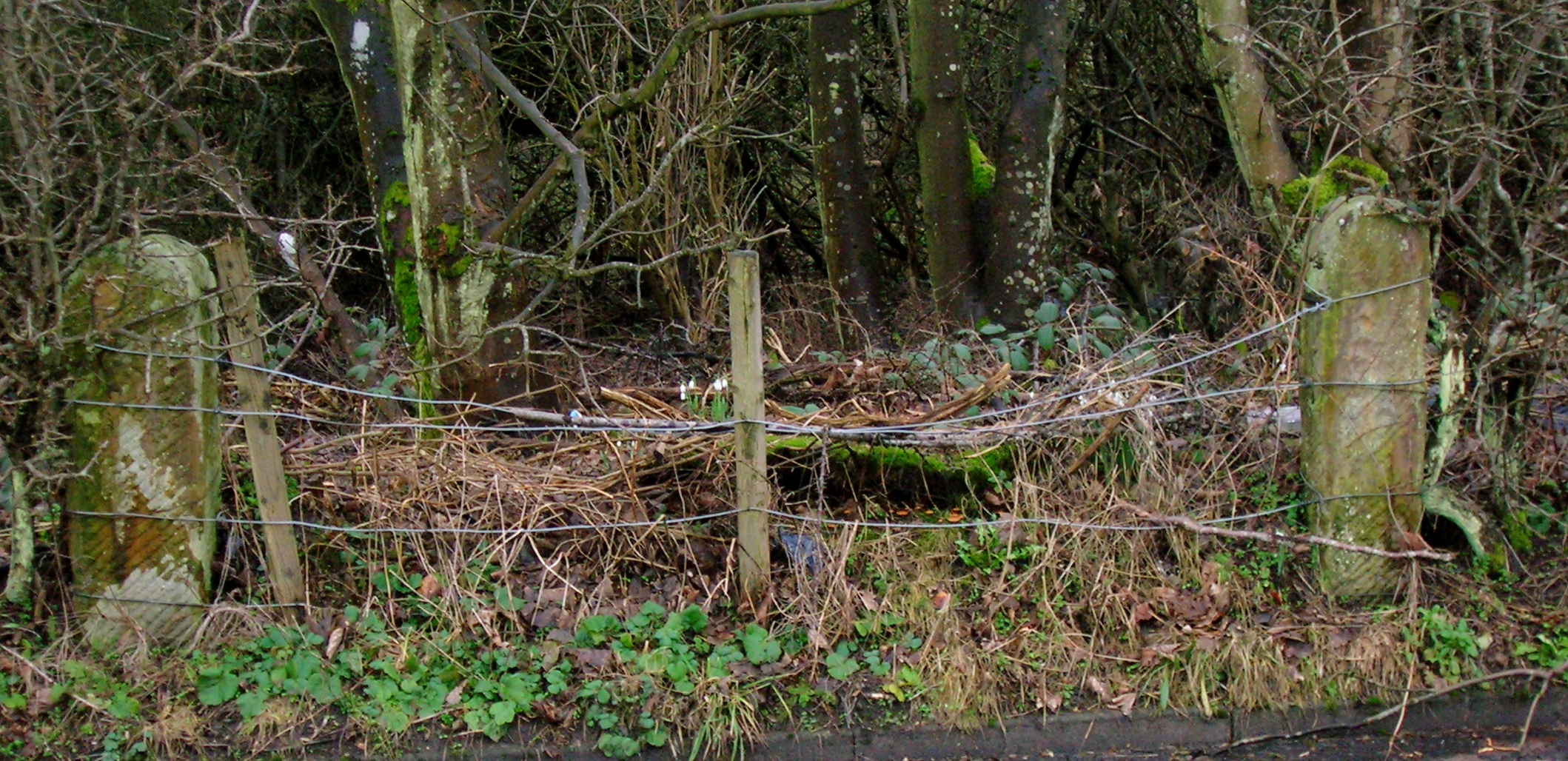
Lochwards gateposts, Trindlemoss Loch outflow

The loch is shown as two lochs on Blaeu's map of 1654, surveyed by Timothy Pont in the early 1600s. In around 1691 the Rev Patrick Warner, purchased the property of Clonbeith from Walter Scott and likewise purchased his lands in Irvine, which included the loch of Trindlemoss with the bounds, fowlings and fishings. Additionally Warner's purchase included the north quarter of the Braid Meadow and two other meadows contiguous with the loch. Warner went on to drain much of the 'Loch of Irving' or Trindlemoss, later called Scott's Loch. Strawhorn records that Provost John Scott of Clonbeith was the one time owner from whom Trindlemoss gained its new name.

In 1763 the common from the Minister's Cast or Gott (a trench, ditch, or watercourse) to Redburn Bridge was enclosed.

=== Treaty of Irvine ===
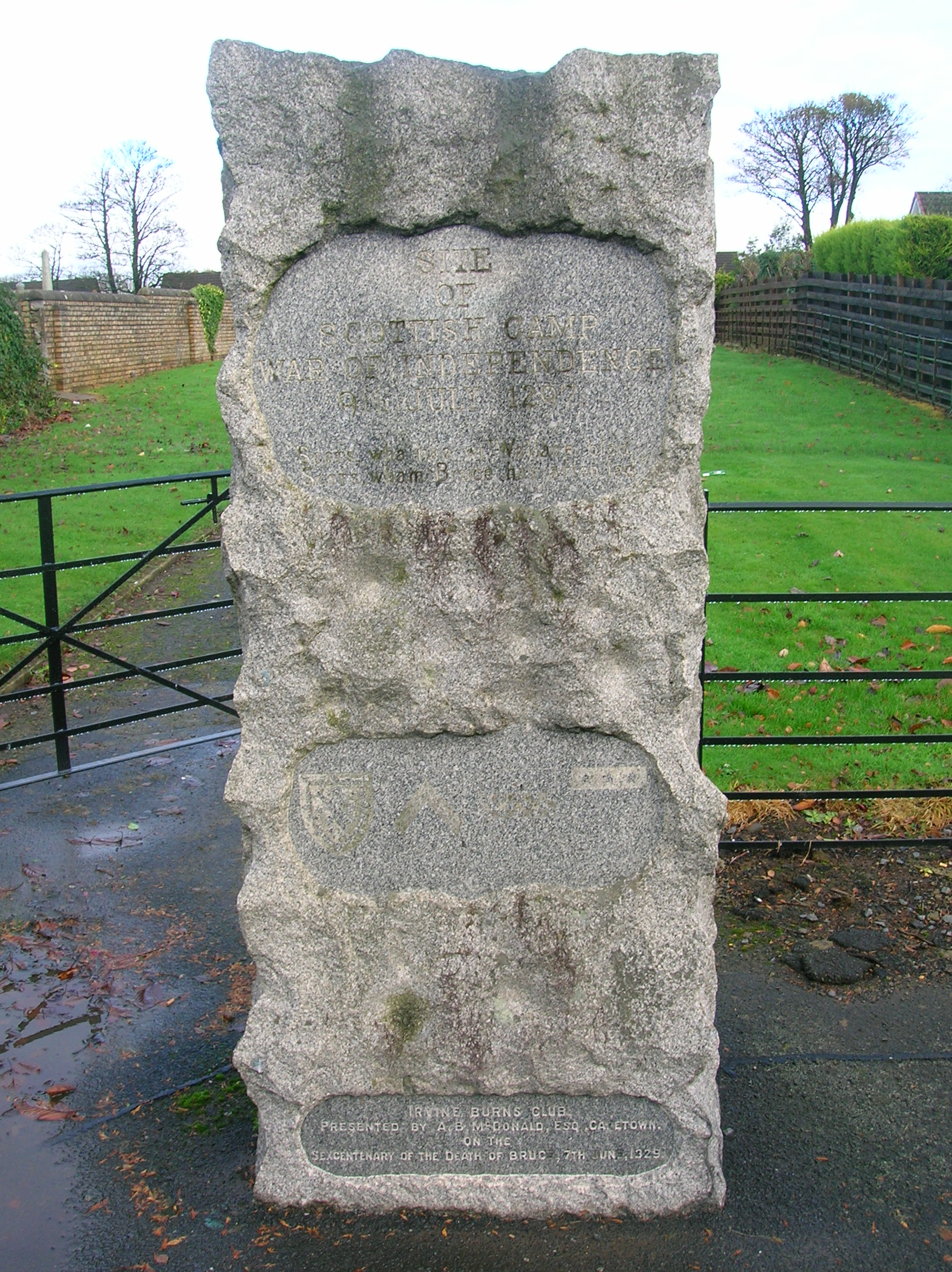
The memorial to the Scottish Army Campsite at Knadgerhill; a battle that never happened

The information plaque at Seagate Castle records that the 'Treaty of Irvine' between Scotland and England was signed at Seagate Castle on 9 July 1297. In 1297 Edward I had sent a punitive expedition under Sir Henry Percy to Irvine to quash an armed uprising against his dethronement of John Balliol. The Earl of Carrick, Robert Bruce, Bishop Wishart and others led the Scottish army, however after much argument they decided to submit without a fight. The armies had been encamped in sight of each other, the English at Tarryholme and the Scots at Knadgerhill, with the Trindlemoss Loch between them.

=== Drainage ===
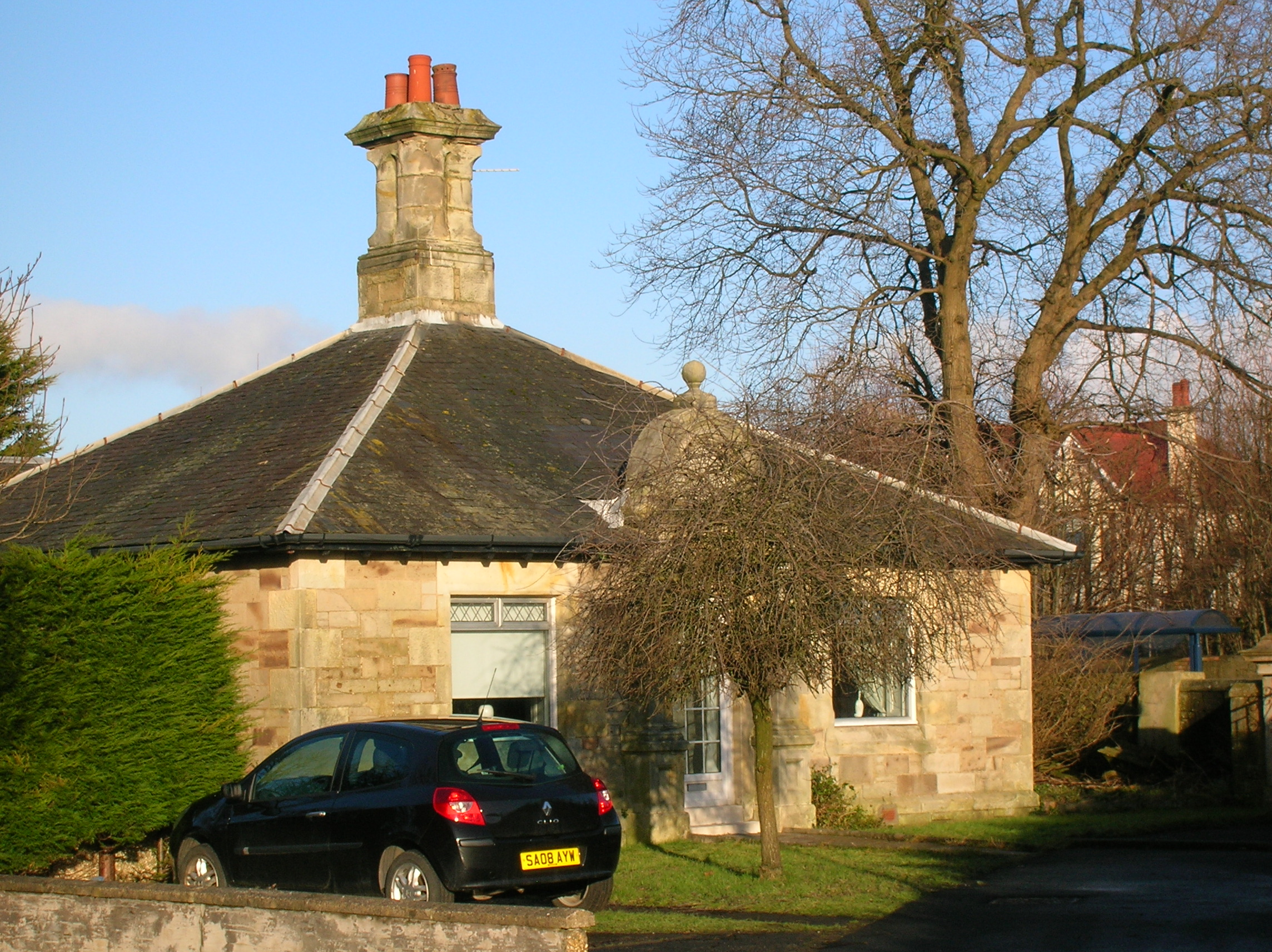
Williamfield Lodge

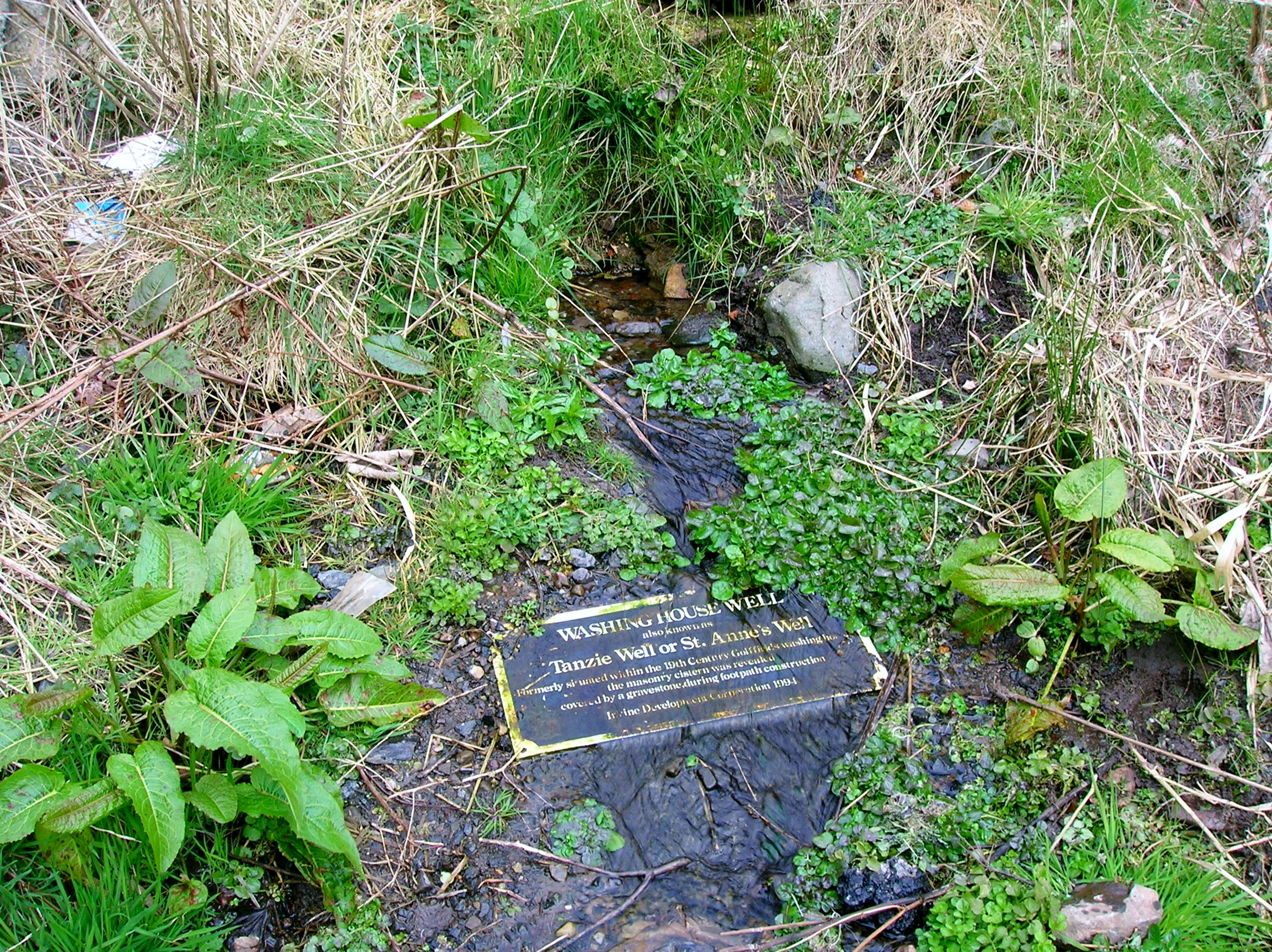
The Tanzie Well near the River Irvine

By 1500 the loch drainage had begun with the Gruipe Gutter cut to drain the loch waters into the River Irvine, the natural outflow being a burn that ran into the Annick Water at Lockwards. Patrick Warner of Ardeer, the parish minister of Irvine, had been exiled to Holland following the Battle of Bothwell Brig and had learned the techniques of drainage from the Dutch. He first dug ditches or 'gotts' that ran into the drain known as the 'Minister's Cast' that ran from the northern end through the old Williamfield area and then into the Irvine as Jenny's Burn. This worked well and the existing drain or stank (a stretch of slow-moving water), known as the 'Grip or Gruipe Gutter' running through the town along what is now Chapel Lane, dried up. Others drained the south end of the loch via the outflow that ran into the Annick Water. The newly drained areas became valuable farm lands.

In August 1682 the Baillie of Irvine, Hugh Montgomery, was reimbursed for a payment of two shillings made to Robert Miller for "casting the goat leading to the loch running betwixt the taelling rigs and the town lands."

The Tanzie Well, St Anne's or the Washing House Well is a spring that runs into the River Irvine near the Pouther House on the Golf Fields. This spring or spout still exists beside the New Bridge, the pedestrian bridge, and is said to drain water from the old Scott's Loch site.

== Watermills ==
Several mills were powered by the loch's waters, such as Lochmills built on Burgh land at Lochwards and powered by the natural outflow of the loch. In 1666 Johne Boill was the miller. The mills lost the water power upon the loch's drainage in the 1690s. Timothy Pont in the early 1600s records a mill as being situated on the southern outflow exit.

Previous location of Trindlemoss Loch, North Ayrshire

== Micro-history ==
When, in the 18th century, a religious group known as the Buchanites were expelled from Irvine, residents threatened to drown them in Scott's Loch, however they made it safely to the village of Closeburn.

== See also ==
- Pow Burn
