= Buchanites =

18th century religious group

The Buchanites were the late 18th-century followers of Elspeth Buchan, a Scottish woman who claimed to be the Woman Clothed with the Sun, one of the figures named in the Book of Revelation.

== History ==
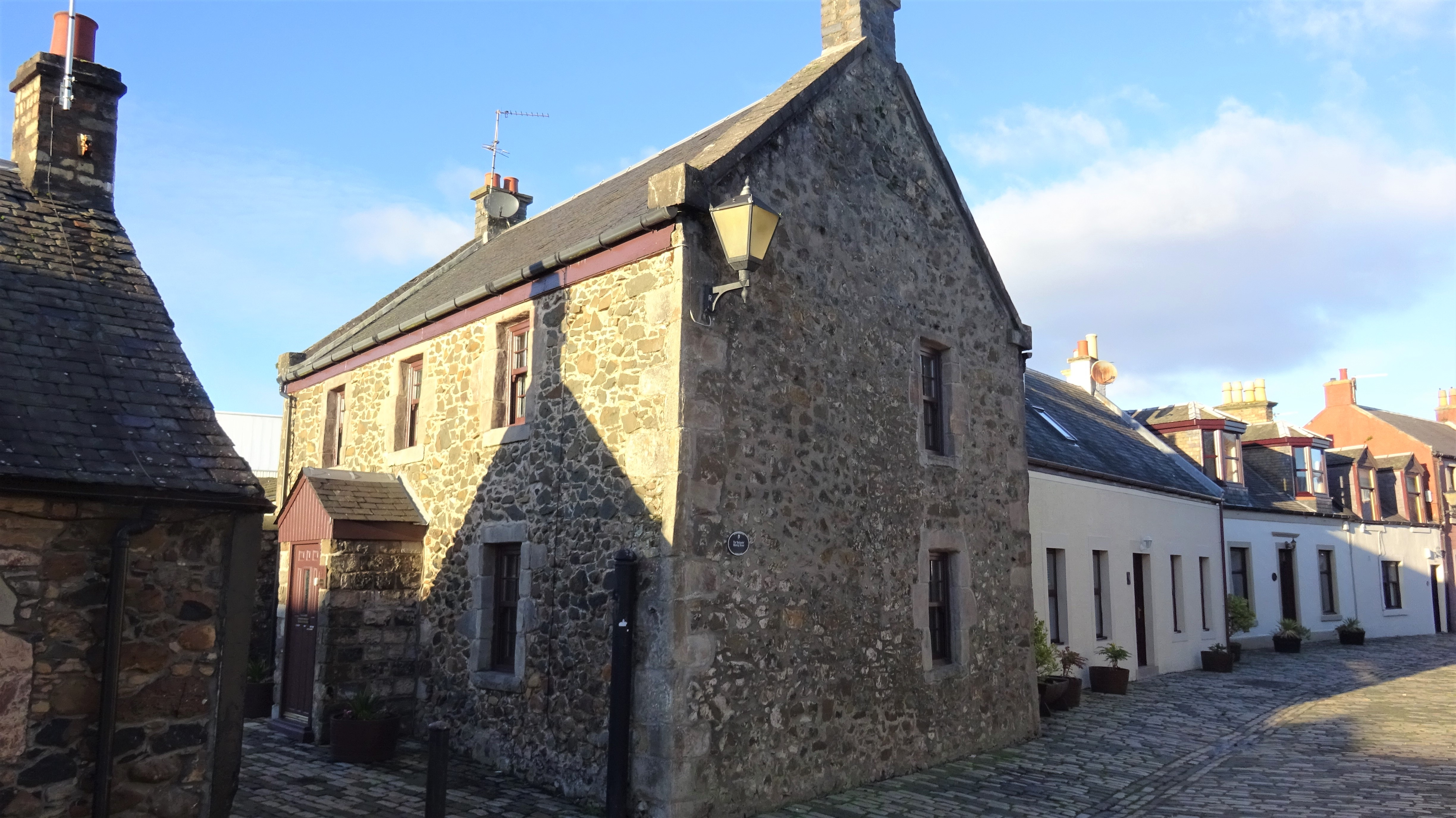
Former Buchanite Meeting House in Glasgow Vennel, Irvine

In 1783, Mrs Buchan, in her late 40s and the daughter of an inn owner, declared herself a prophet and a biblical figure in her own right, and claimed to be immortal and able to give immortality to her followers by breathing on them. She gathered in Irvine, Ayrshire, a group of followers who broke away from the Relief Church when Hugh White, minister at Irvine, declared Elspeth Buchan (1739-1791) to be a special saint identified with the woman described in Revelation 12.

Elspeth Buchan was born in Fordyce, Banff, Elspeth Simpson daughter of John Simpson and Margaret Gordon and married Robert Buchan and hence the name.

The Buchanites were expelled from Irvine, residents even threatening to drown them in the town's Scott's Loch. Eventually they made their way to Closeburn (north of Dumfries) in 1784, where they prepared to ascend en bloc at short notice to Heaven. As with many controversial sects in various times and places, they were rumoured by a disapproving society to have practised behaviour that contravened social norms – "a community of wives" or "orgies in the woods"; but there is no conclusive proof that they did either. They were expelled from Dumfriesshire in 1787 and then settled in various farms in the Crocketford area (Stewartry of Kirkcudbright) before finally settling at Newhouse in the village of Crocketford.

Mrs Buchan died of natural causes in 1791, disproving her claim to immortality. The end of the Buchanite saga came in 1846, when the last "adherent", Andrew Innes, died. Innes, who lived in the (still existing) Buchanite last abode, "Newhouse", Crocketford, had expected a "resurrection" of the mummified body of Mother Buchan on 29 March 1841 - the 50th anniversary of her death. He was disappointed and died at "Newhouse" in 1846 - a death which coincided with the discovery of Mother Buchan's hidden mummified body. Many Buchanites were buried (or reburied) in a graveyard next to the north-west wall of "Newhouse", in the expectation that they would "ascend" eventually with "Lucky" Buchan.

== References in literature ==
The Buchanites are remembered in Scottish literature in the works of John Galt, who was a four-year-old child in Irvine when the sect was expelled. According to Galt's autobiography, he "with many children also accompanied her, but my mother in a state of distraction pursued, and drew me back by the lug and the horn. [...] [T]he scene, and more than once the enthusiasm of [their] psalm singing, has risen in my remembrance, especially in describing the Covenanters in Ringan Gilhaize."

They are also mentioned - quite negatively - in a letter by Robert Burns: "[A]bout two years ago, a Mrs Buchan from Glasgow came among them, & began to spread some fanatical notions of religion among them, [...] till in spring last the Populace rose & mobbed the old leader Buchan & put her out of the town; on which all her followers voluntarily quit the place likewise, & with such precipitation, that many of them never shut their doors behind them [...] Their tenets are a strange jumble of enthusiastic jargon; among others, she pretends to give them the Holy Ghost by breathing on them, which she does with postures & practices that are scandalously indecent. They have likewise disposed of all life, carrying on a great farce of pretended devotion in barns, & woods, where they lodge and lye all together, & hold likewise a community of women, as it is another of their tenets that they can commit no moral sin. [...] This My Dear Sir, is one of the many instances of the folly in leaving the guidance of sound reason, & common sense in matters of Religion."

The Buchanites are the subject of a 1937 novella by F. L. Lucas, The Woman Clothed with the Sun, which takes the form of an account, written by a Scottish minister in middle age, of his youthful bewitchment by Elspeth Buchan and of his curious sojourn in the Buchanite communes of Dumfriesshire and Kirkcudbrightshire. They are also the subject of a 2002 short story by Emma Donoghue, "Revelations".

Robert Burns in his Interleaved Scots Musical Museum noted for the song "The Beds of sweet Roses" that This song, as far as I know, for the first time appears here in print --- When I was a boy, it was a very popular song in Ayrshire, I remember to have heard those fanatics, the Buchanites, sing some of their nonsensical rhymes, which they dignify with the name of hymns, to this air.
