= Saint Inan =

Coordinates: 55.616°N 4.665°W

- Born: 9th Century; Scotland
- Died: 9th Century; Scotland
- Venerated in: Roman Catholic Church Eastern Orthodox Church
- Canonized: Pre-Congregation
- Feast: 19 August
- Patronage: Irvine, Scotland

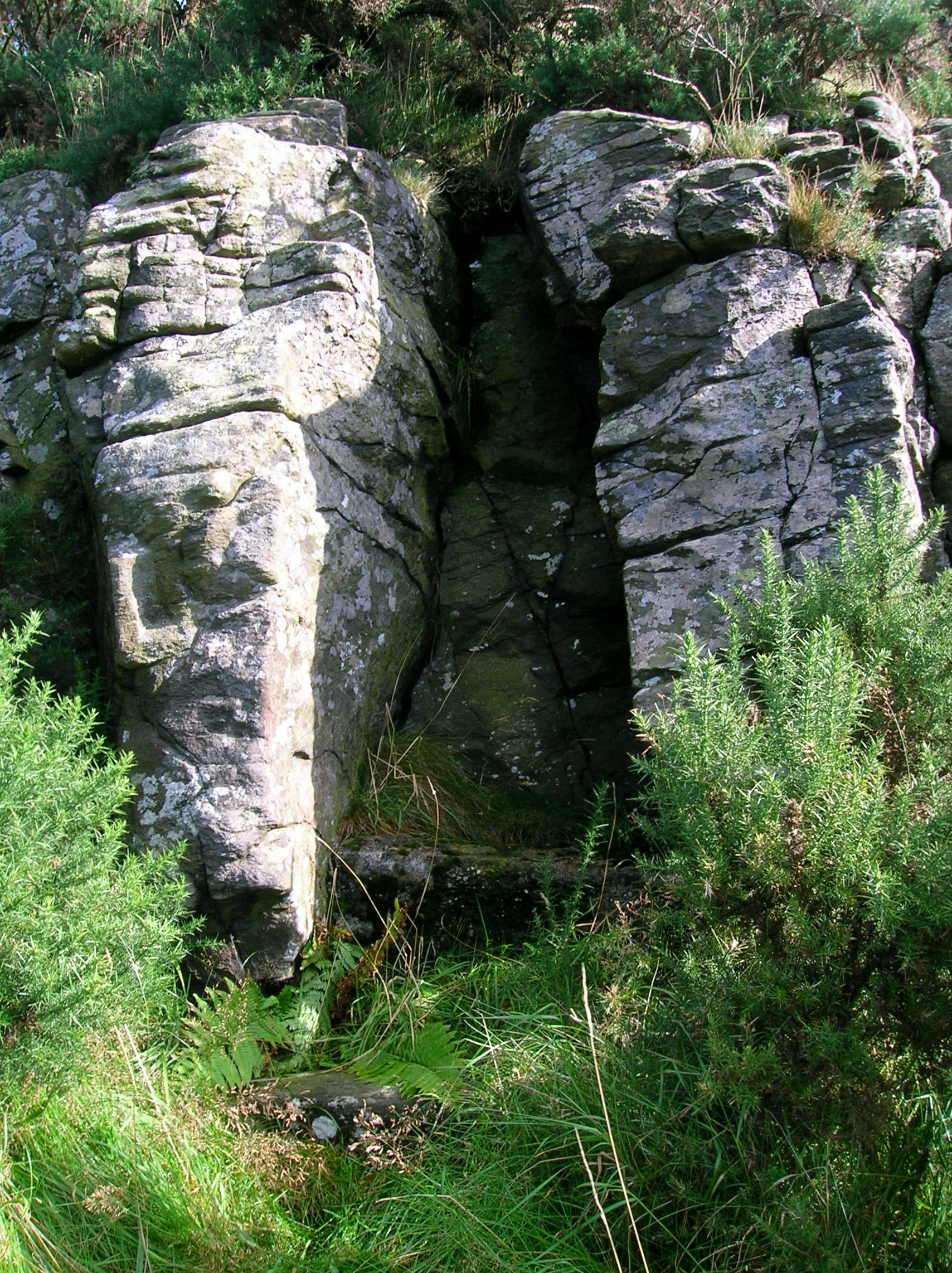
Saint Inan's Chair on Cauldhame Hill, Beith

Saint Inan (Evan) was the patron saint of Irvine, Ayrshire, Scotland, where he is said to have resided during the 9th century AD. He is reputed to have come as a monk of the Celtic Church from Iona Abbey, and to have died in Irvine, where his tomb was reputed to have been the site of miracles.

== History ==
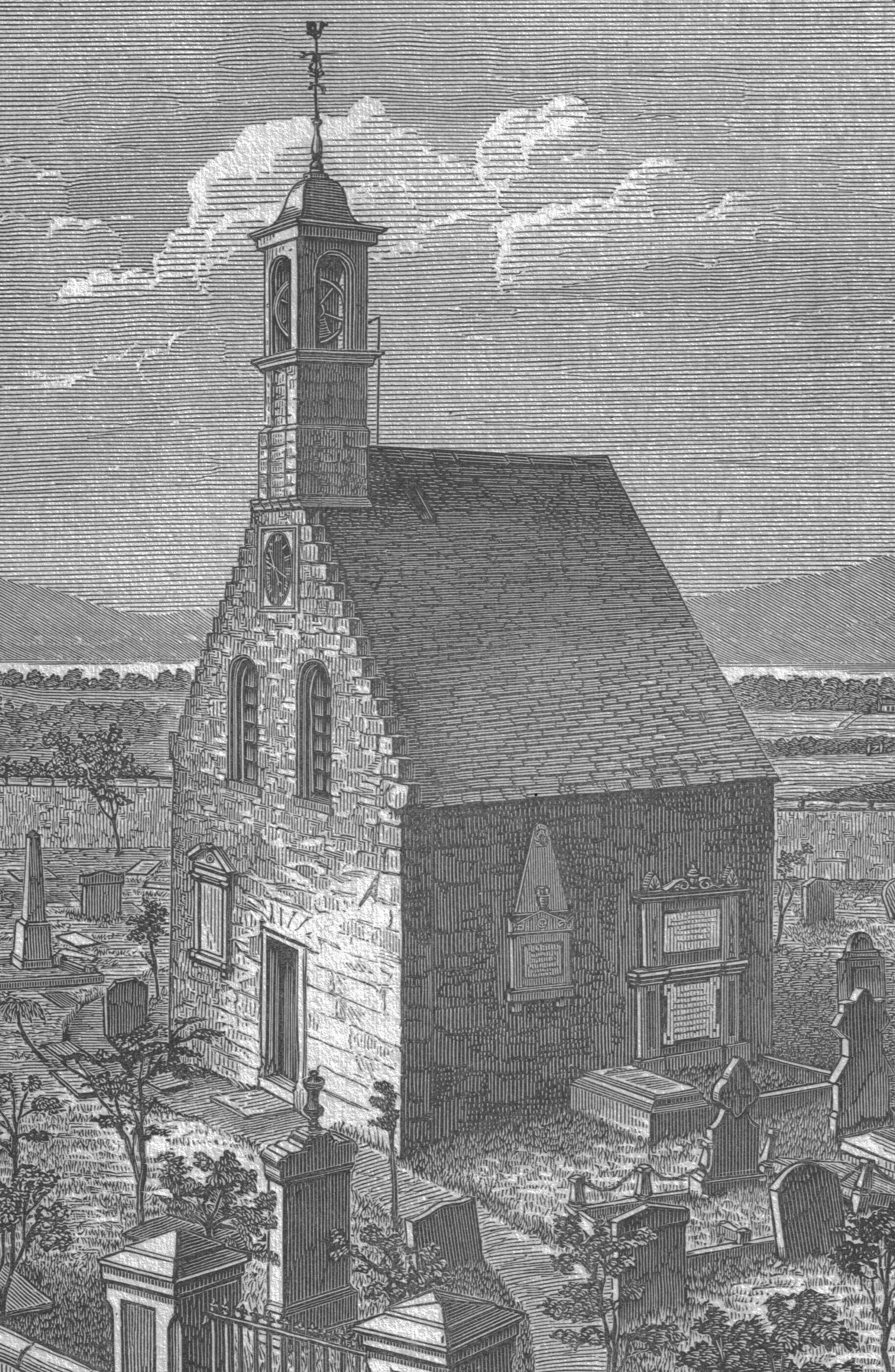
Beith Kirk in 1876, built on the site of Saint Inan's chapel.

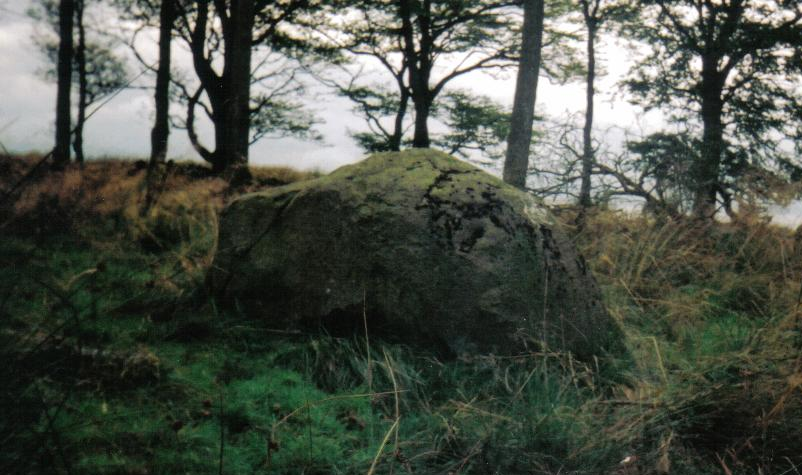
The rocking Stone at Cuff Hill.

Although he is said to have been a hermit, according to tradition St. Inan is said to have often visited the town of Beith, frequenting Cuff Hill with its rocking stone and various other prehistoric monuments. A cleft in the west-front of Lochlands Hill is still known as 'St. Inan's Chair' and said to have been used by the saint as a pulpit. and a crystal-clear holy well existed nearby, now sadly covered over (2006). An unsuccessful search for the saint's writings which were said to be preserved in the library of Bonci, Archbishop of Pisa was made by Colonel Mure of Caldwell in the 19th century.

Saint Inan has said to have preached to the assembled people from the chair on the hill and stayed on the site of Cauldhame Cottage. There was not a great population in the area at that time and the people were located not in Beith, but up on the top of the Bigholm near to what were the Beith water dams. The first settlements were in the heavily wooded areas around the dams where people were safe from attack and could get food from the land, and fish in the lochs. The Saints of old went where the people were, and they also tended to go where there had been worship of heathen Gods. It has been suggested that High Bogside Farm, which used to be called Bellsgrove, was really 'Baalsgrove', which would fit in with the story of Saint Inan going to where the pagan gods were.

=== The Holy well and chapel ===
Irvine circa 1870. The Old parish kirk, manse and site of the Chapel well (where the two figures are standing on the right bank below the kirk).

The well is usually known as St Mary's or the Chapel Well. It is situated at Grid reference NS 3226 3851. It lies close to what was probably a chapel dedicated to St Mary. Above the opening is a small stone plaque stating 'St Inan's Well AD 839'.

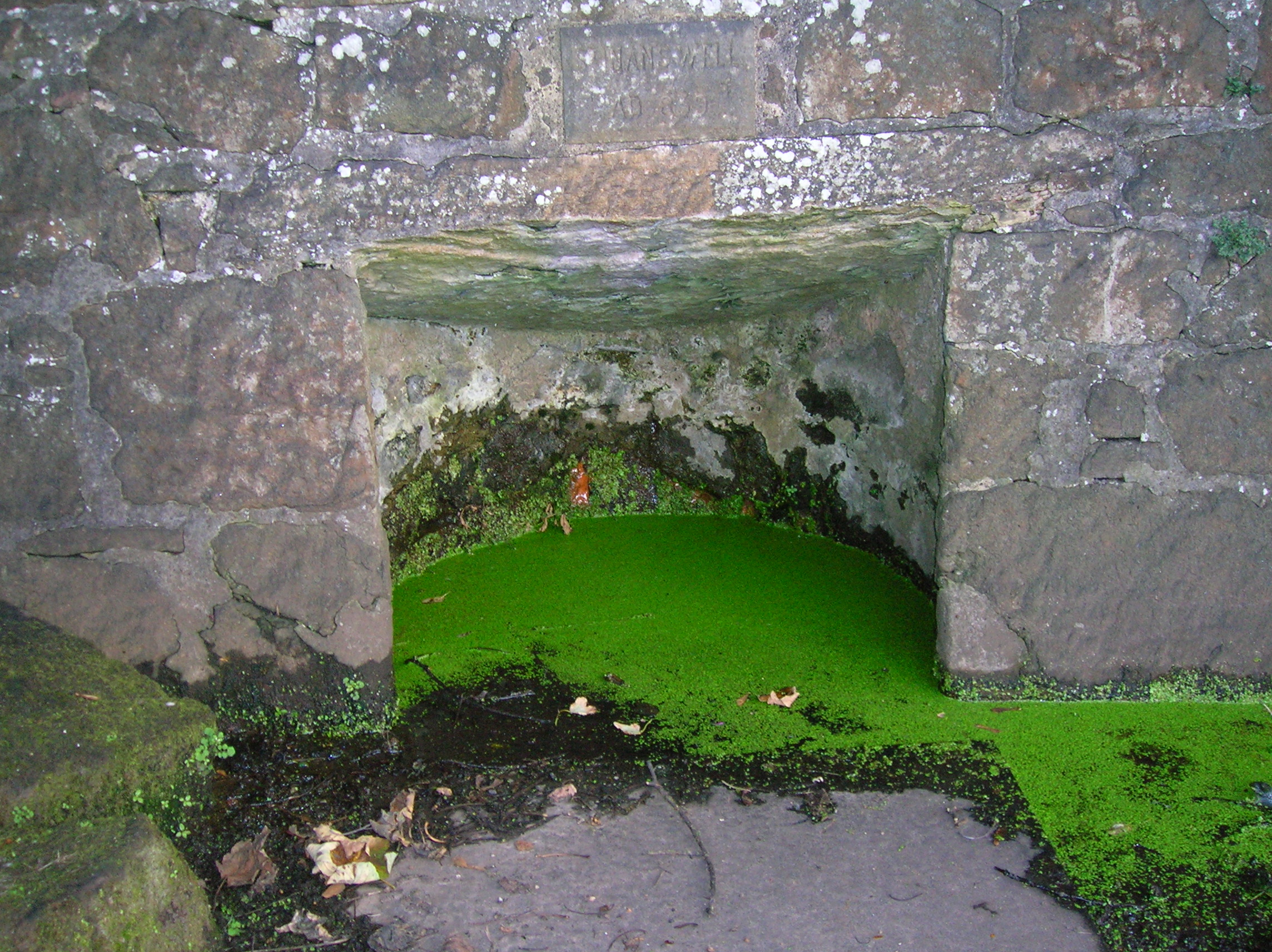
Saint Inan's Well near the Old Parish kirk. Dated 839 AD.

Saint Inan's chapel stood on the site of the old church in Beith (NS 349 538), the dedication later being changed to St. Mary the Virgin.

After journeying to Rome and Jerusalem, he is said to have settled at Irvine, where he died, and where his tomb was much frequented on account of the reputed miracles wrought at it.

A Saint Inan's well once supposedly existed in Fullarton, south of the present harbour. Dundonald Castle once had a chapel dedicated to Saint Inan. Inchinnan (Renfrewshire) is said to signify “Inans’ Isle".

=== Variations in the name ===
His name has several recorded spellings, such as Evan, Innan, Inin, Innen, Enen, Ennen and latterly Annan, Anan, Tinnan or even Tennant. He is remembered in local names such as Southannan, near Fairlie, where there was another church or chapel bearing his name; a charter of James IV in 1509, confirms the donation of John, Lord Sempill, of a perpetual Mass therein. Saint Ninian and Saint Inan may in fact be one and the same person.

=== Tennant's day ===
Beith's annual fair, called Tennant's or Saint Tinnan's Day, was previously on the saint's day, 18 August. It is now held in June. In ancient times the fair is said to have been held on Cuff Hill. It was famous for its show, Cadgers races and sale of horses.

== See also ==
- River Irvine
- Lady's Well
- Beith
- Lowes Loch, Ayrshire
- Inchinnan
