= Spier's School =

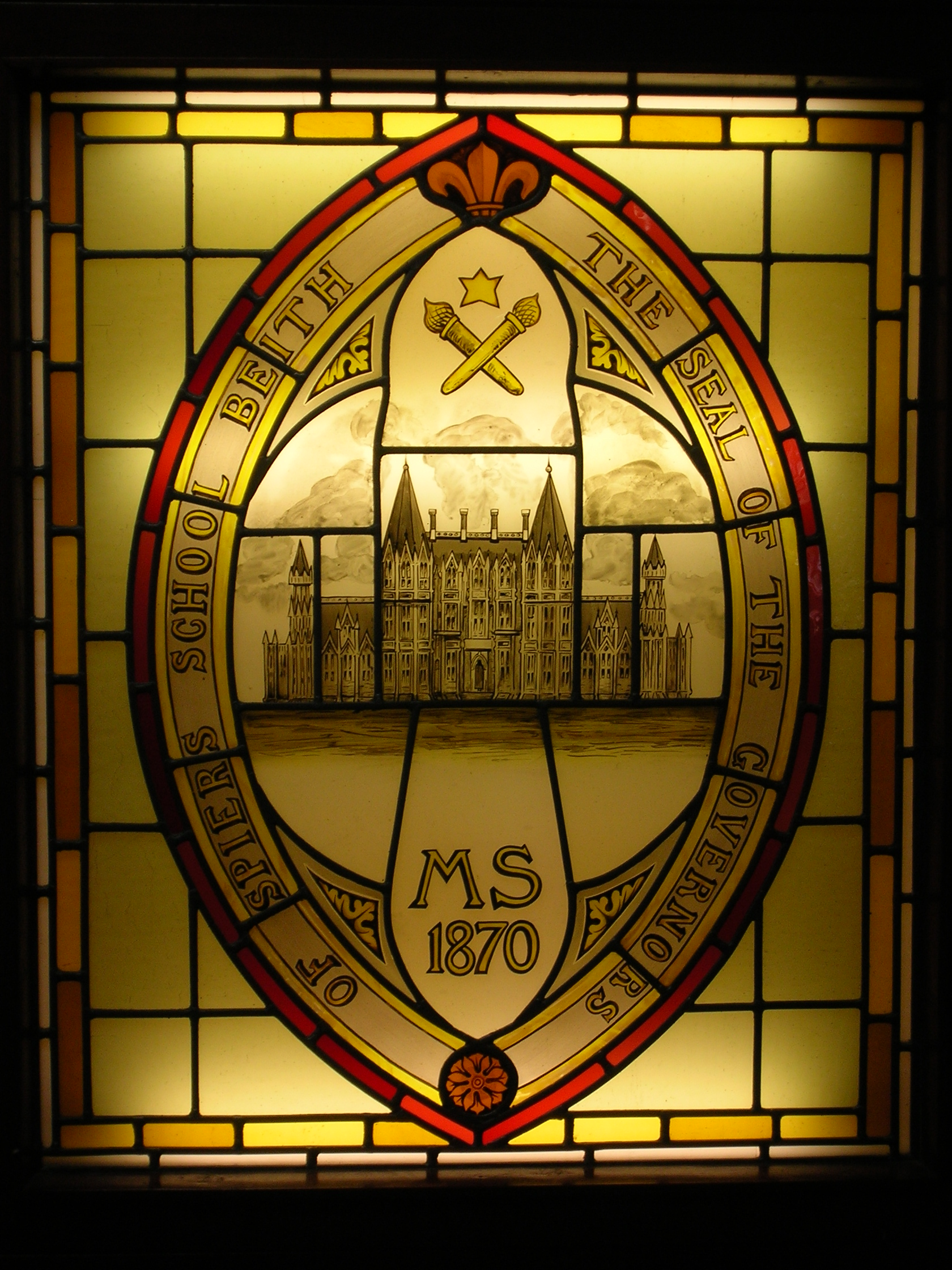
- The Seal of the Governors of Spier's school. Note the 'old' architectural design - which was never used, and the date; some 18 years before the school opened. This item is now located at Beith Primary school.
- Interactive map of the Spier's School area

General information
- Location: KA15 1LU, Beith, North Ayrshire, Scotland
- Coordinates: 55.745°N 4.625°W
- Construction started: September 1887
- Completed: September 1888
- Demolished: 1984
- Cost: £12,000
- Client: John Spier

Design and construction
- Architect: James Sellars

Spier's School (NS352533), at Beith, in North Ayrshire, Scotland was opened in 1888 and closed in 1972. The school, now demolished, was built using Ballochmyle red sandstone and was reminiscent of the ancient Glasgow University. The school motto was 'Quod verum tutum' (What is true is safe). The gardens and woodlands are open to the public at all times.

Sustrans National Route 7 at Kilbirnie Lochside is the nearest cycle-route access. The Barrmill Road entrance is on the bus route from Beith to Barrmill.

== Marshalland ==
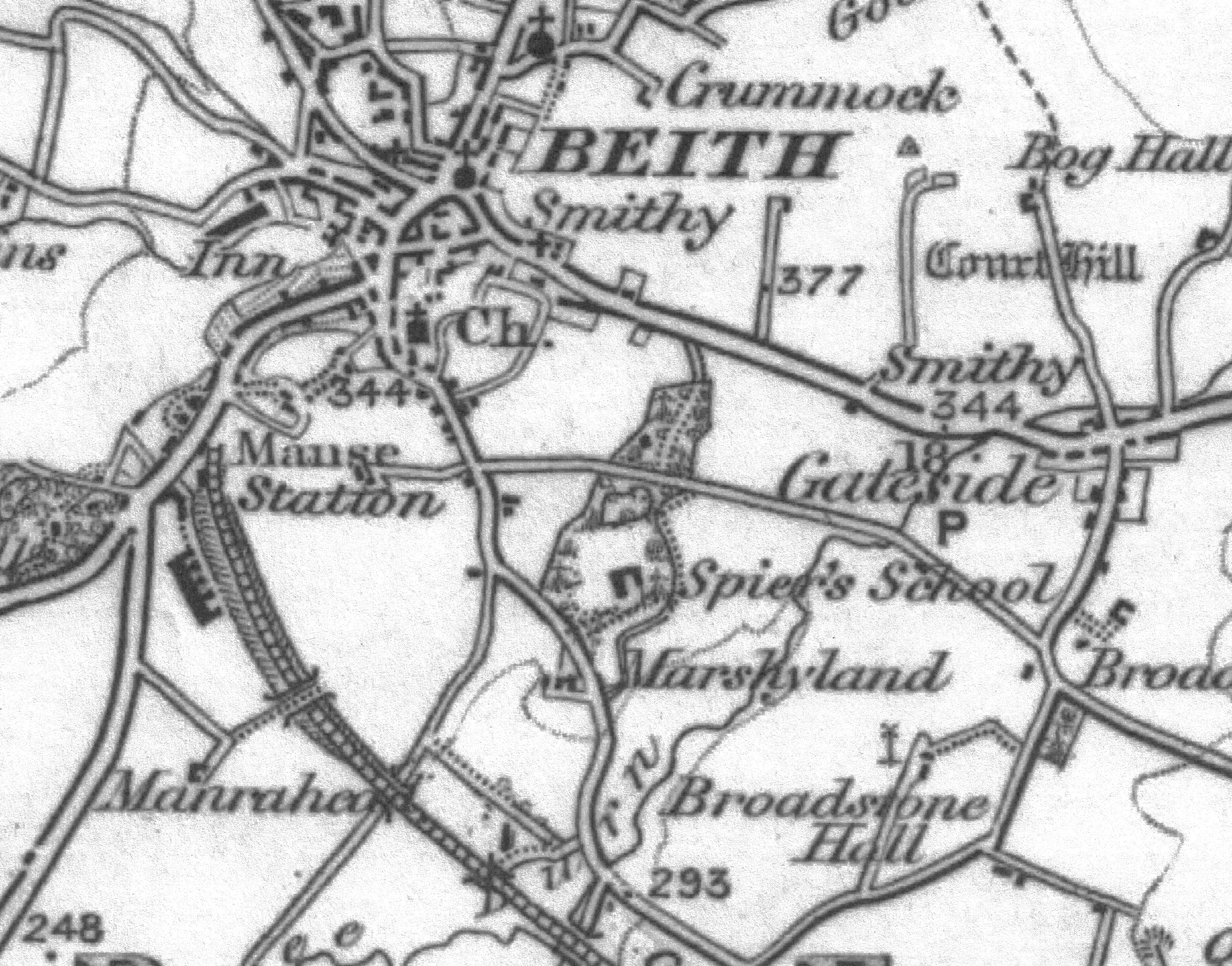
Spier's school's location near Beith

In 1686, John Shedden, ancestor of the Sheddens of Morrishill in Beith, obtained the 14 shilling Lands of "Marsheland" from Hugh and John Lyle. He also obtained the 32 Penny Land of Erestoun's Mailling or "Burnside of Marsheland". Margaret, a daughter of Matthew Montgomerie of Bogston, married John Shedden about 1700.

Roy's map of 1747 refers to the site of the later school as "Marchland" and shows the property lying on the boundary (or march) of the Barony of Broadstone, within the Lordship of Giffen, and the Barony of Beith, the physical boundary being formed at this point by the Powgree Burn, which is also recorded as the Powgreen or Marshyland burn. Marshalland lay within the Barony of Broadstone. Later maps call the area "Marshyland" and "Marshalland". A Marshall family were blacksmiths in Gateside for many generations, however no direct connection has been shown to exist.

John Shedden of Marsheland, born on 25 April 1756, was locally known as 'Jack the Marsheland'. He was known as a poacher of hares, at a time when the game laws were very strict. Jack had various brushes with the law, and as a result he had to leave the area for a while and became a game-keeper, his local nickname adapting itself to become 'Jack the Gem-Keeper.' When he died, he had a friend fire a shotgun over his grave, much to the surprise and consternation of the minister.

Robert Service bought Marsheland and passed it on to his son Robert. In 1816-17, the younger Robert Service sold it to Robert Spier, father of John Spier. In 1820, the part of "the Marshal-land" held by Robert Spier had a rent value of £58 18s 2d, while another part held by a Mrs Gibson was valued at £20 0s 0d. Aitken's map of 1829 shows an R. Spier, Esquire, as resident at "Marsheyland". Andrew Spier, John's brother, is called "of Marshalland" and may have lived there until his untimely death.

Robert Spier owned the Cuff estate, and through his marriage to Margaret Gibson acquired the estate of Marshalland. John Spier was the son of Robert Spier, described as a Writer and bank agent in Beith, owner of the Marshalland and Cuff estates, which included Bogstone, Bellcraig, Eastend of Shutterflat, and Lugton Ridge farms. Robert was descended from the Spiers of Kersland Mill, which he bought from his elder brother. Through good business acumen, he accumulated a considerable fortune of £40,000 in land and money, equivalent to £4,205,089 in 2025.

In a map of 1858, the land on which the school was later built shows only the presence of two wells and the fields of the Marshalland farm, with its tree-lined hedgerows. Tom Paterson and his sister farmed Marshalland in the 1950s, and the last people to live at Marshalland were David and Mary Kerr, before the fine house and associated farm buildings were demolished in the early 1960s.

== Foundation of the school ==
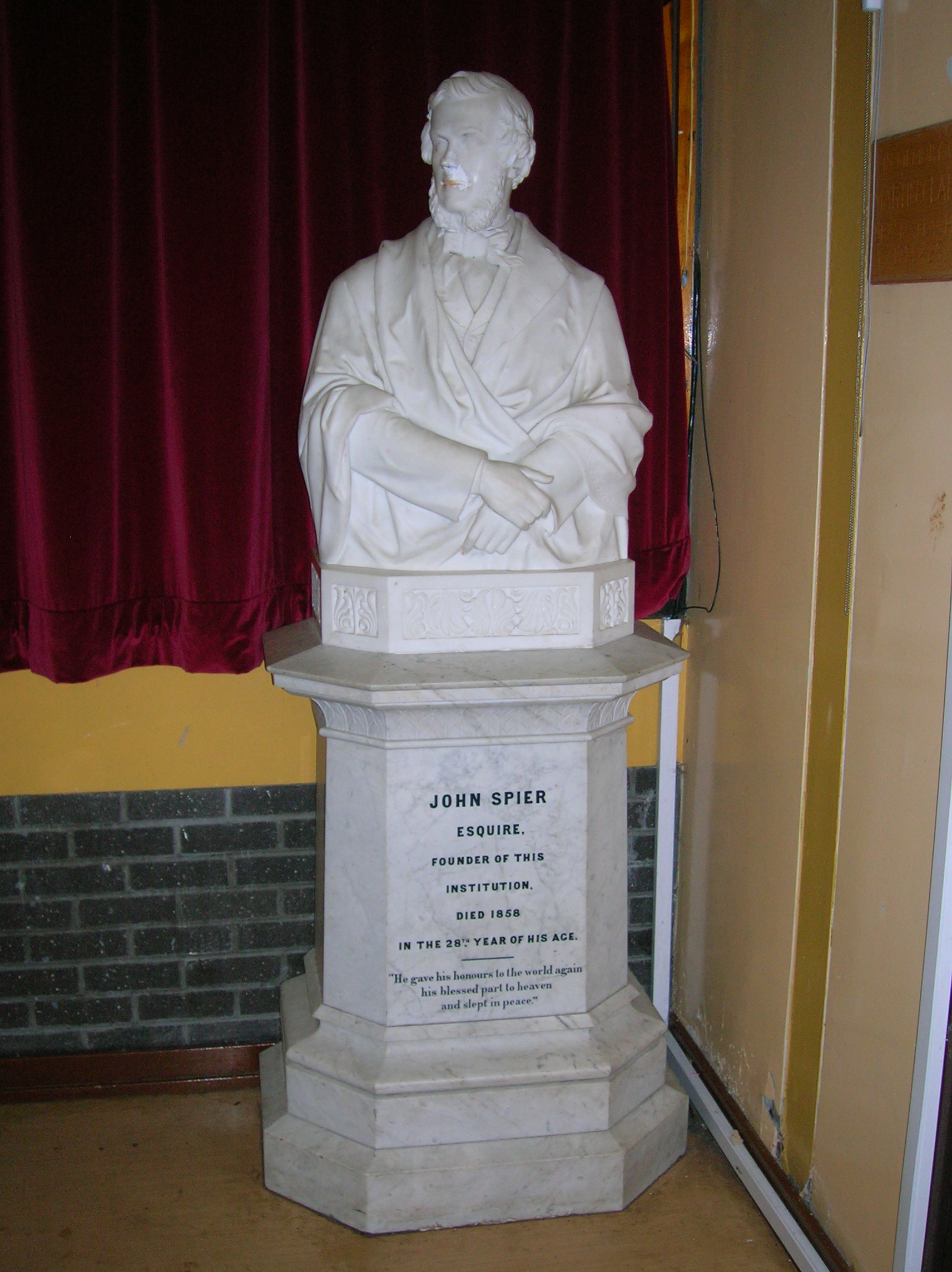
Statue of John Spier (died 1858), honoured as founder of the school

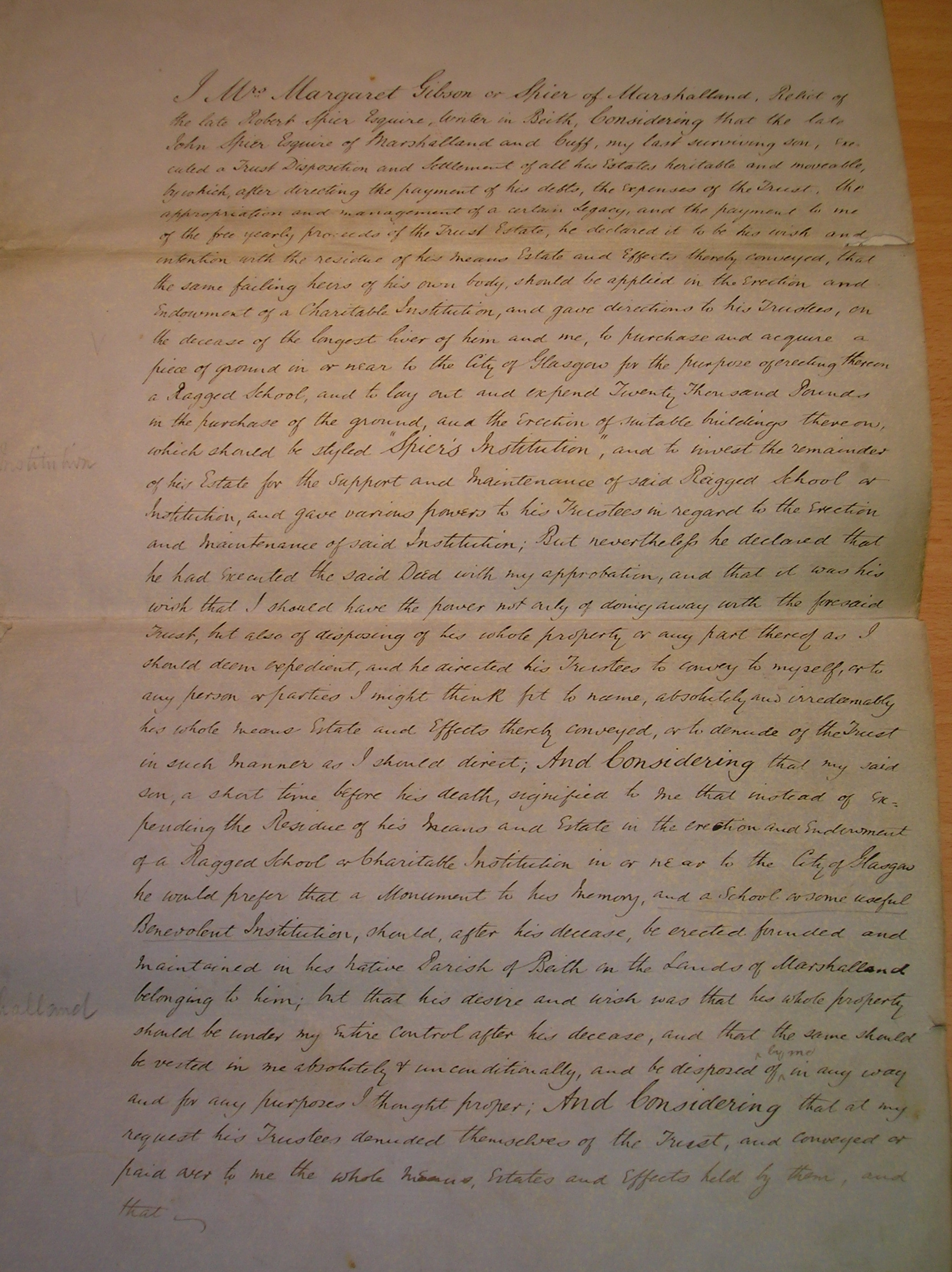
The Spier's Institution Disposition of 1869

Margaret Gibson or Spier, of Whang House, the widow of Robert Spier of Marshalland and Cuff, was herself from a local family, and she had sons who predeceased her. John Spier of Cuff died in 1858 at the age of 28 in Largs, and his brother Andrew Spier of Marshalland had died before him. Before he died, John expressed a wish for a school to be founded with the inheritance which would have been his. By a disposition and settlement dated 19 March 1869, Margaret Gibson Spier put money in trust for the founding of a "ragged" or charitable school near Glasgow, and gave instructions that construction was to begin within a year of her death. She stipulated that the school should provide places for 24 children, who were not to have pauper or tradesmen parents and were to be of any religious denomination except for Roman Catholicism. Teachers and other staff were to be dismissed if they married, were to retire at sixty with no pension from the trust, and if sick were to pay for a teacher to cover their duties. No Roman Catholics were to be employed, and the Presbyterian minister of Beith was to make weekly visits of inspection.

When Margaret Spier died on 17 February 1870, perhaps as the result of a carriage accident, there was £12,000 for the erection of the intended school. She had also bought the lands of Bogston and Corshole from Charlotte Decker or Montgomerie in 1848, and these were part of the foundation endowment of Spier's School. She also left money for other charitable purposes, as recorded in the vestibule of Beith Kirk. In addition to the money for the school, she charged her lands of Cuff with a yearly payment of £25 to the Ministers of Beith Kirk to provide warm clothing and coals to the deserving poor of the town and parish. Locally Margaret Spier was known as 'Lady' Spier. She also appears to have wanted to build a hospital, however funds were not available from her estates for such a costly enterprise. After her death, Whang House was bought by a Thomas Miller.

John Thomas Rochead of Glasgow was to have been the architect of the school, and a very specific requirement was that 'Binny' stone for Edinburgh was to be used in the school's construction, so far as possible. William Brodie was to be the sculptor of the Spier memorial statues and an Italian sculpture of the 'Graces and two cupids', favourite of John Spier, was to be permanently housed in the Spier's school board room.

John Spier, Margaret's eldest surviving son, had the task of carrying out her wishes, and had different ideas. He seems to have intended that the school should also serve as a memorial to himself, and decided to site it in the parish of Beith. However, this led to disputes and delays, and an investigation by a Royal Commission, and a final plan emerged from that for a co-educational day school at Beith which would be equipped to take a small number of boarders. B. W. Cochran-Patrick of Ladyland & Woodside delivered his "Dedication Speech of the Spier School" on 28 April 1887, and in September 1887 the school's foundation stone was laid on site, in the presence of more than a thousand guests.

== School history ==
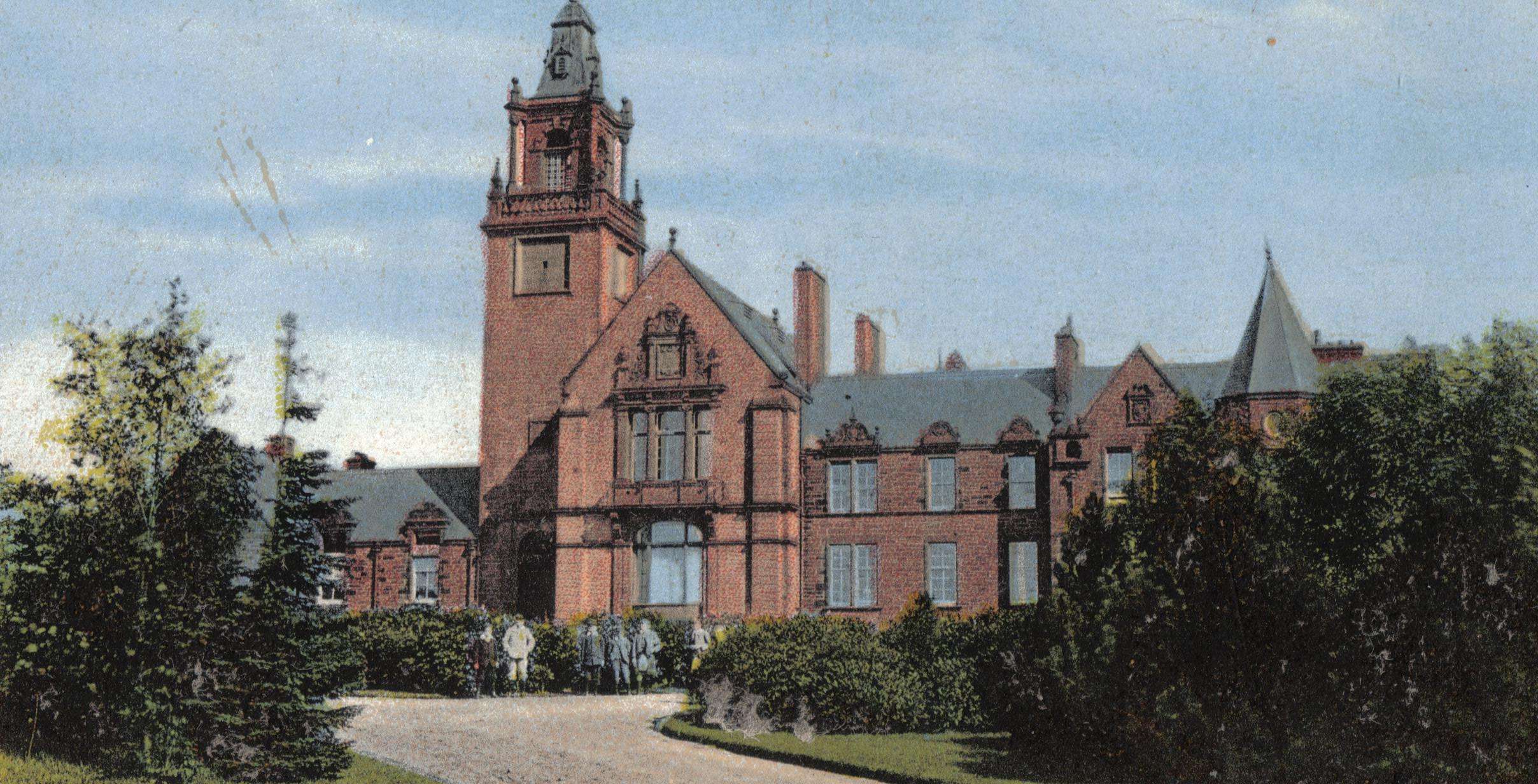
Spier's School in 1900

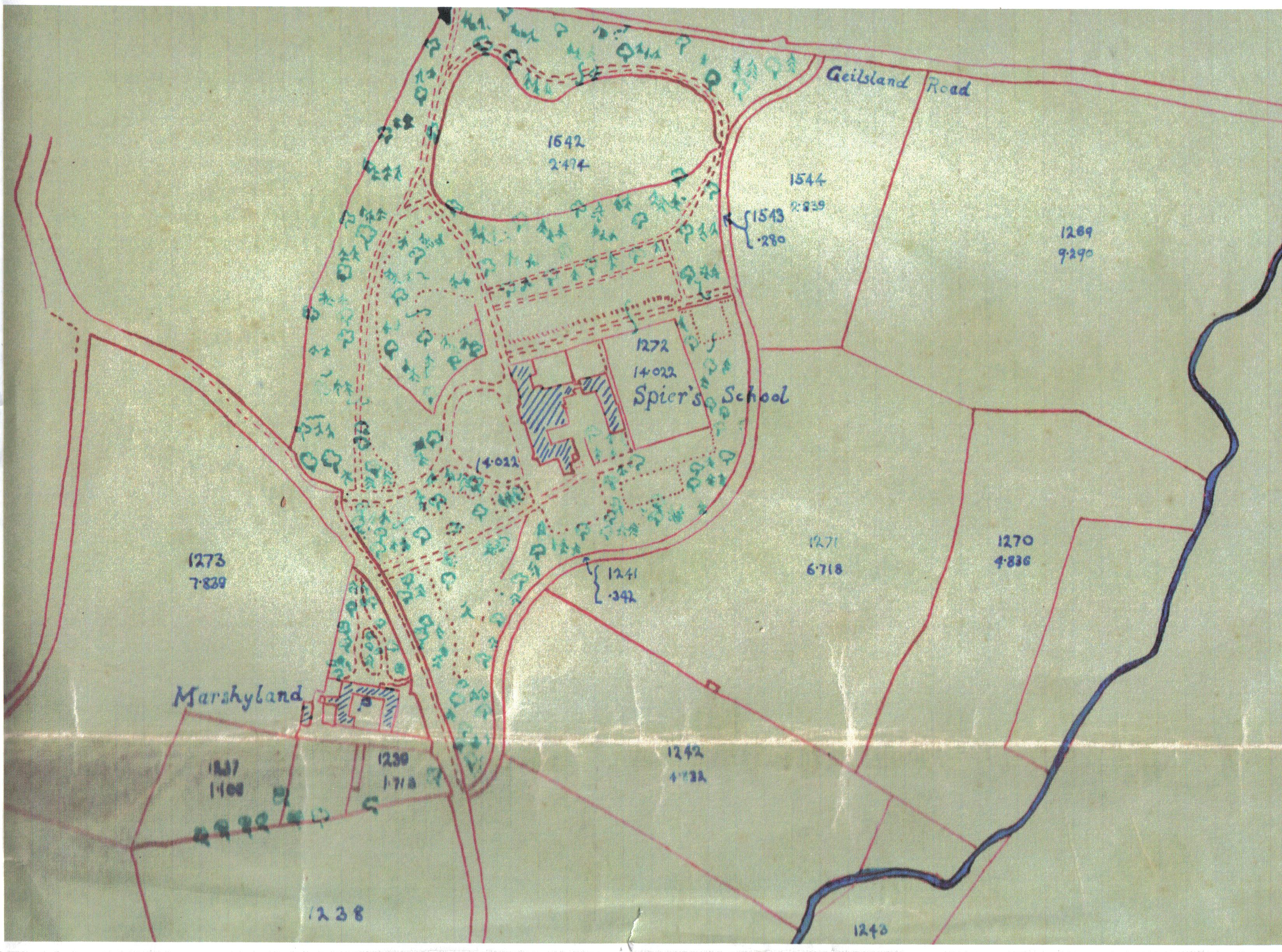
A map of the school as it was in 1888

Location of Spier's School grounds

The school opened on 22 September 1888, with 140 pupils, mostly from North Ayrshire, and with Robert Bruce Lockhart, previously head of Waid Academy, as the first headmaster. Fees were charged, but free education was available to local children who passed a qualifying examination and were recommended by their schoolteachers.

The school administration was in the hands of the Lord Lieutenant of the County, seven representatives of the school boards, and the existing trustees as life governors, to be replaced by two heritors of the parish of Beith in due course.

The boarders were always a minor element, never more than fourteen. They lived in the Head Master's house and wore kilts on weekdays and Eton suits and hats on Sundays. Fees were 50 guineas for full-time boarders; 40 for weekly boarders; and 6 guineas per annum for day-scholars. The First World War of 1914 to 1918 and the shortage of domestic staff resulted in boarding at the school coming to an end for the duration of the war.

The boys were taught separately from the girls until 1893, when the extra costs of this forced a more liberal approach to emerge. In 1895, Dr J. A. Third took over from Lockhart as head. The school motto was "Quod verum, tutum", meaning What is true is safe. An initiation tradition for new boys at the senior school was to be thrown into the pond and then over the wall into Marshalland, known as being 'Ducked and Tossed'.

The murder of Mary Speir Gunn happened at Northbank Cottage, Portencross, in 1913. She was a granddaughter of Margaret Gibson Spier, and the murder remains unsolved to this day.

Dr Third retired in 1919, and later headmasters of the school and was succeeded briefly by Alexander Emslie (1919–1921) and then by Gilbert R. Mair (1921–1937).

The number on the school roll was 310 in 1933, and it reached a high point of over 350 after new classrooms were added. By 1932, however, the school was in financial difficulties, and in 1936, after a prolonged campaign, the county education authority took over the school.

In 1937, soon after the takeover by Ayrshire, a new headmaster, Robert R. Fairley, was appointed, and he remained in post until 1963, when he was succeeded by the school's last head, David K. Conn. In 1968, there were nineteen full-time staff and four itinerant teachers in the secondary department, and two in the junior school. The senior school had three houses, to which pupils belonged, Cuff, Spier's, and Marshalland.

The school closed on 30 June 1972, at the end of the summer term, due to the imminent opening of Garnock Academy at Kilbirnie, which took over the secondary pupils from Spier's, Kilbirnie Central, and Dalry High School. The Spier's School buildings became derelict and were eventually demolished in the 1980s.

Some of the ornamental stonework was recovered after demolition and lay near the staff car park at Garnock Academy, Kilbirnie; some of the stones were built into a commemorative seat. The Spier's school rector's table and chairs, together with a stained glass window and the John Spier statue, were also at Garnock Academy. In 2016, Garnock Academy also closed, to be replaced by the Garnock Community Campus at Longbar. Some of the Spier's stones have been moved to the Spier's School grounds.

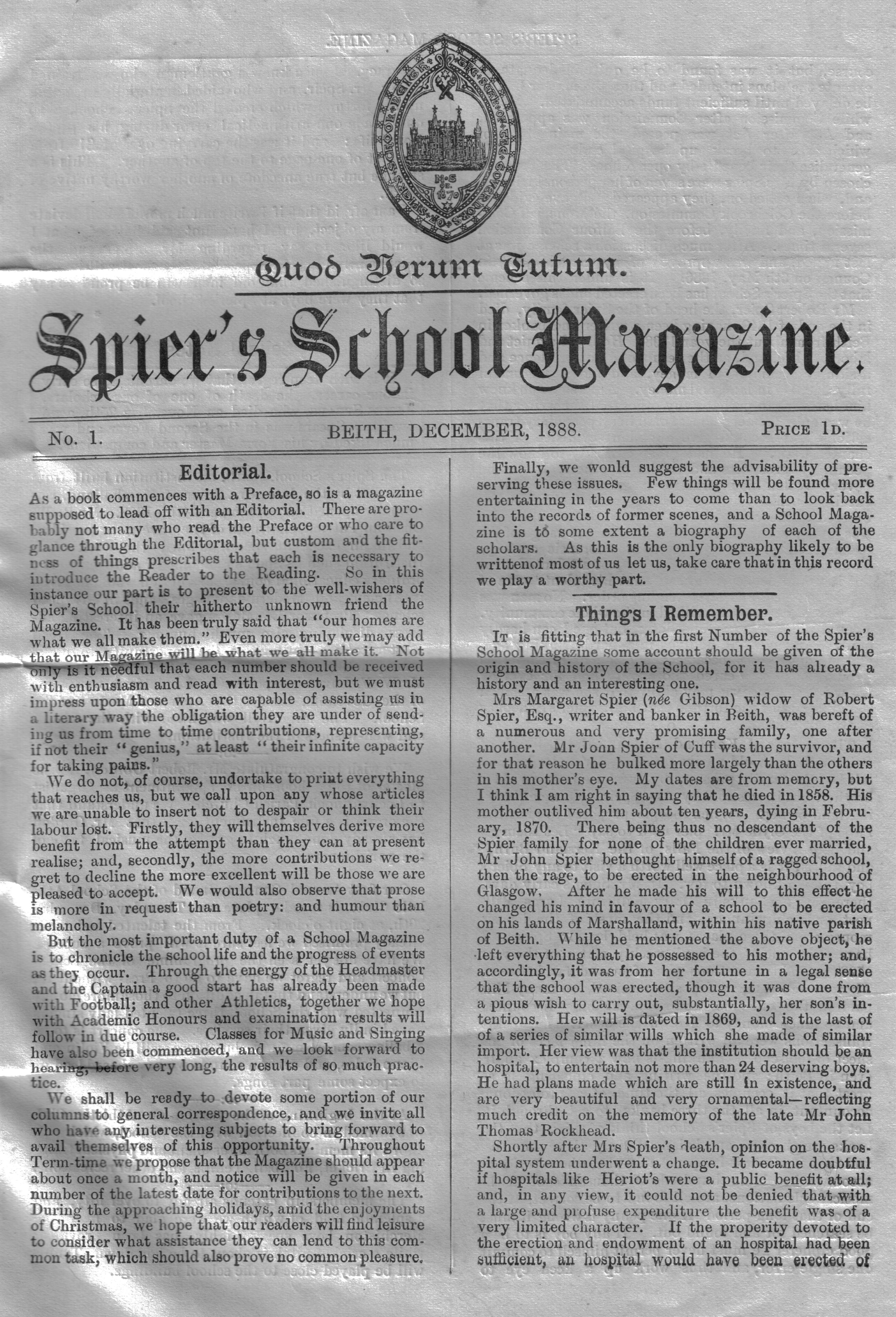
Spier's Magazine No 1, 1888

== The school buildings ==
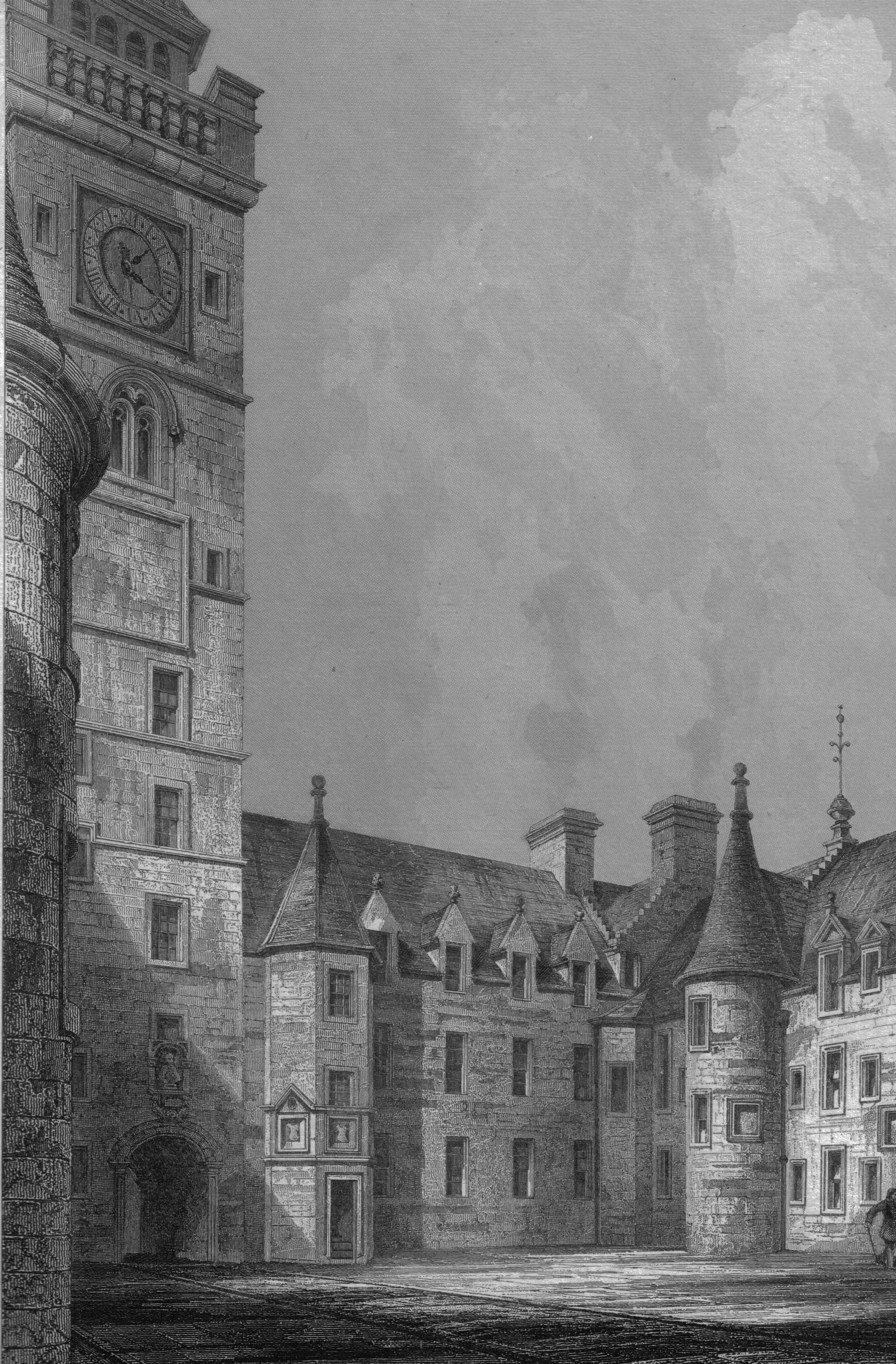
A view of Glasgow's old university buildings after which Spier's was modelled

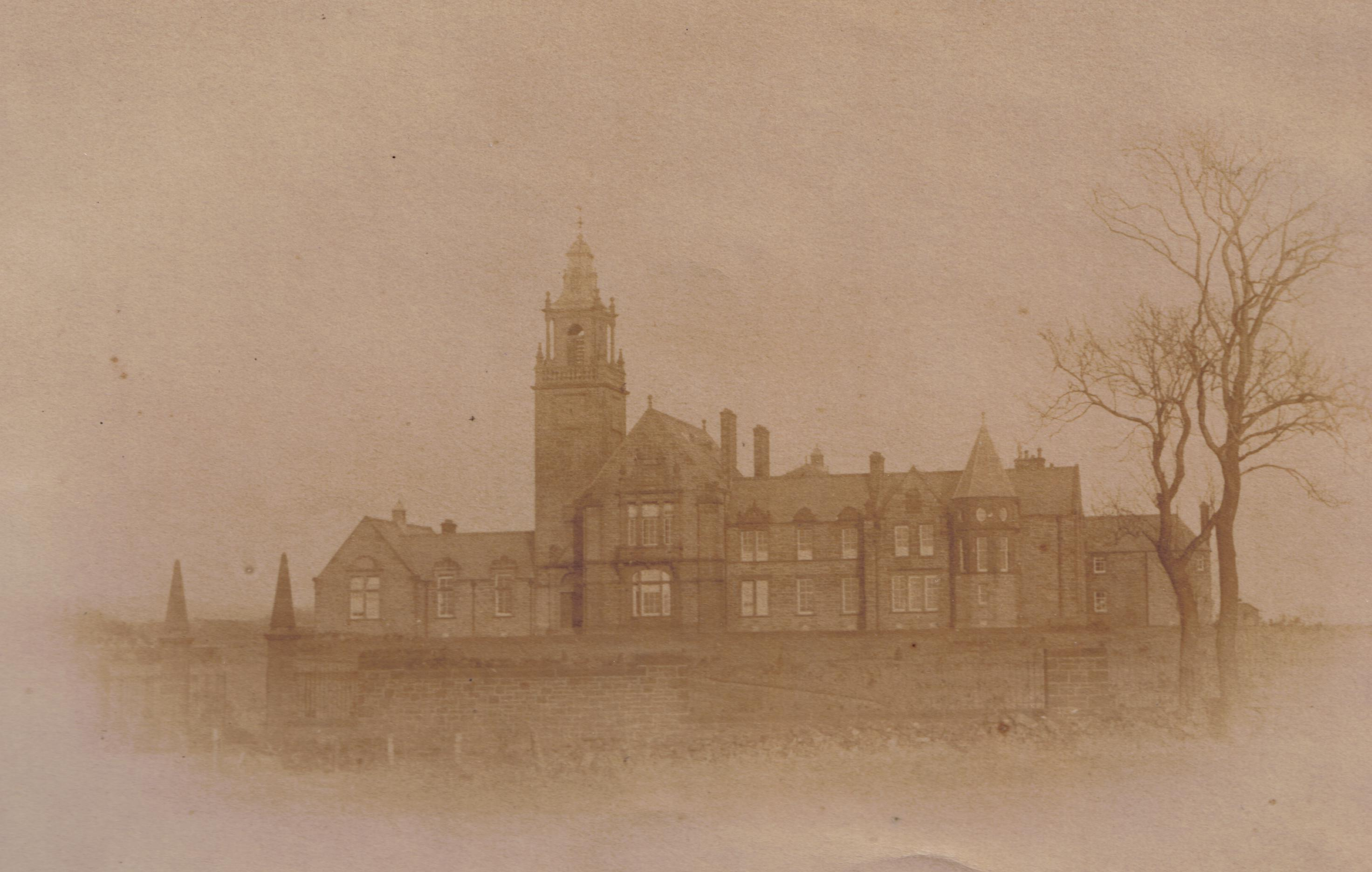
Spier's School in 1891

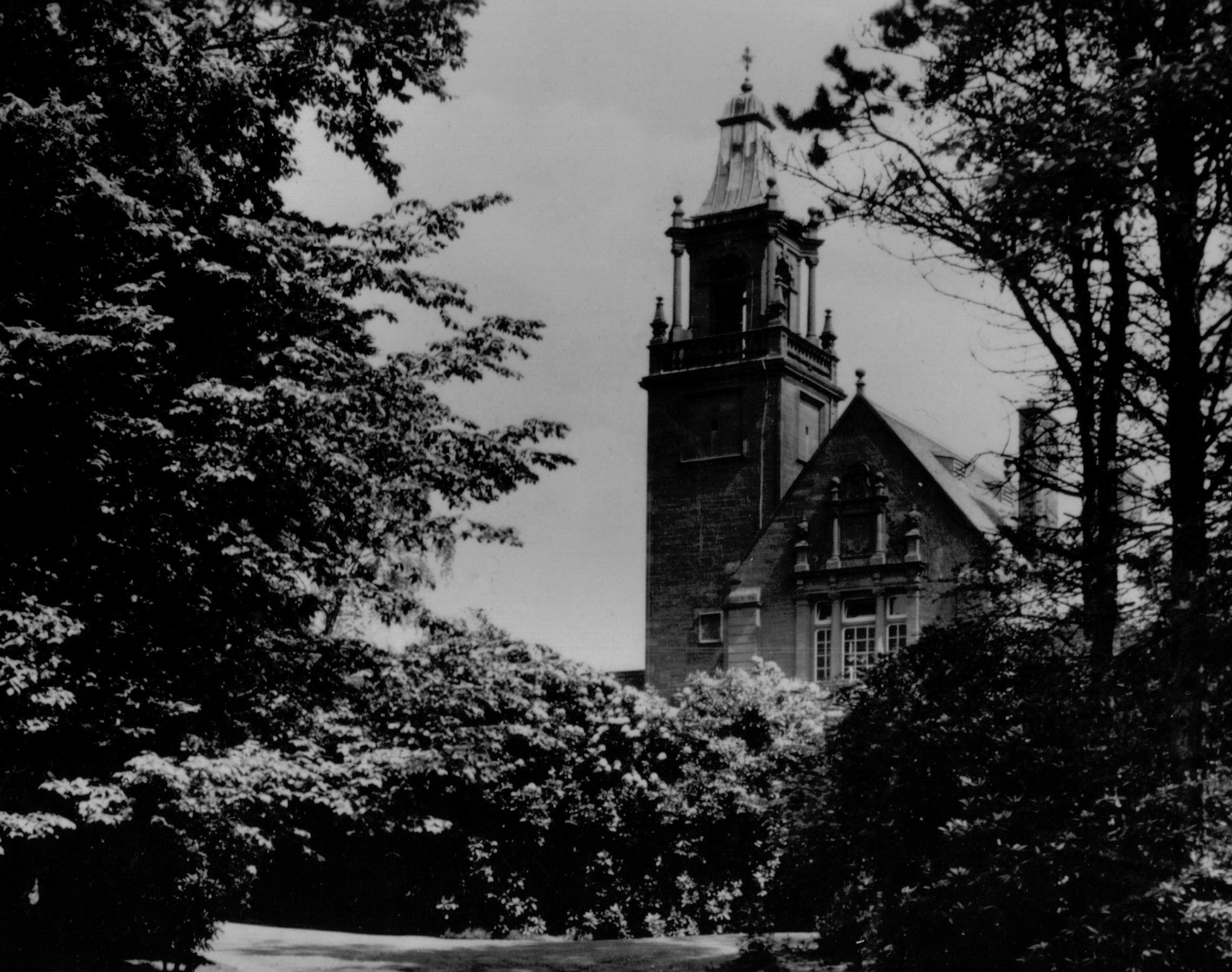
Spier's School in the 1950s

The Barrmill Road entrance is stylistically of 17th century style, comparable to those at Moray House of 1628 in the Canongate, Edinburgh. The entrance is a C Listed structure, as are the boundary walls and the two other gates. The total length of the boundary walls is 937 metres.

Spier's school or college when first completed had a 100-foot (30 m) belltower, hall, boardrooms, 10 classrooms and school-house all designed in the 17th-century style by Campbell Douglas and James Sellars, a Glasgow architectural firm. James Sellars died before the school was completed. The old seal of the governors and a stained glass window (now in Beith Primary School) depicting the seal, shows that a "French middle point" design had originally been intended. The buildings actually constructed were also on a smaller scale than had been intended. The cost was £12,000. An Art room, gymnasium and a Science room were added in 1908, during Dr Third's time. Four Horsa classrooms were added after 1945, being built on the site of the Head Master's garden or orchard. Electricity was installed once the Ayrshire Education authority took charge, however after closure on 30 June 1972 the buildings were subject to vandalism and all the buildings were demolished in 1984.

The Spier's Trust Working Group and the Regional Council made various attempts to find a new use for the buildings, even employing ASSIST, a Glasgow Architectural practice, in 1981. Many suggestions were made, ranging from Country Club to sports academy, but none were ultimately successful for this category 'B' listed building. One proposal, The Spier's Centre, would have had facilities for show jumping, a dry-ski slope, saunas, a solarium, stables, a heritage centre, a cafe, Park Ranger's office, etc. costing £730,000.

The John Spier memorials were moved to the Old Kirk in Beith in the same year. The large statue of John Spier which used to stand outside the rector's office was moved to Garnock Academy. The gate piers are C-Listed and the 'tops' were known as the 'Dunces' Caps' by the pupils.

A separate 'Janitor's or Caretaker's' house existed; last occupied by a Mrs.Rae.

== School sports ==
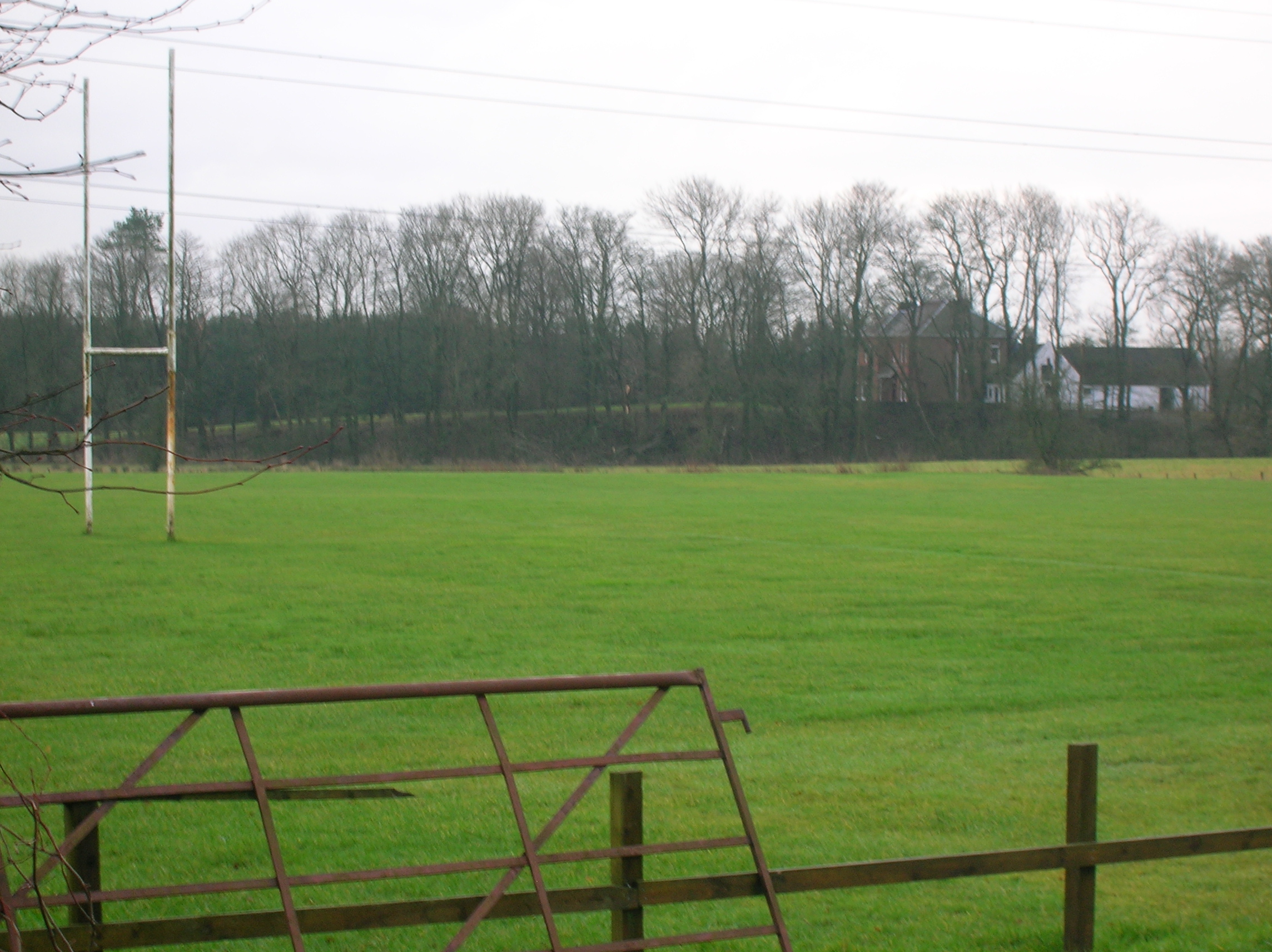
The Marshlands playing fields with Craig House in the background

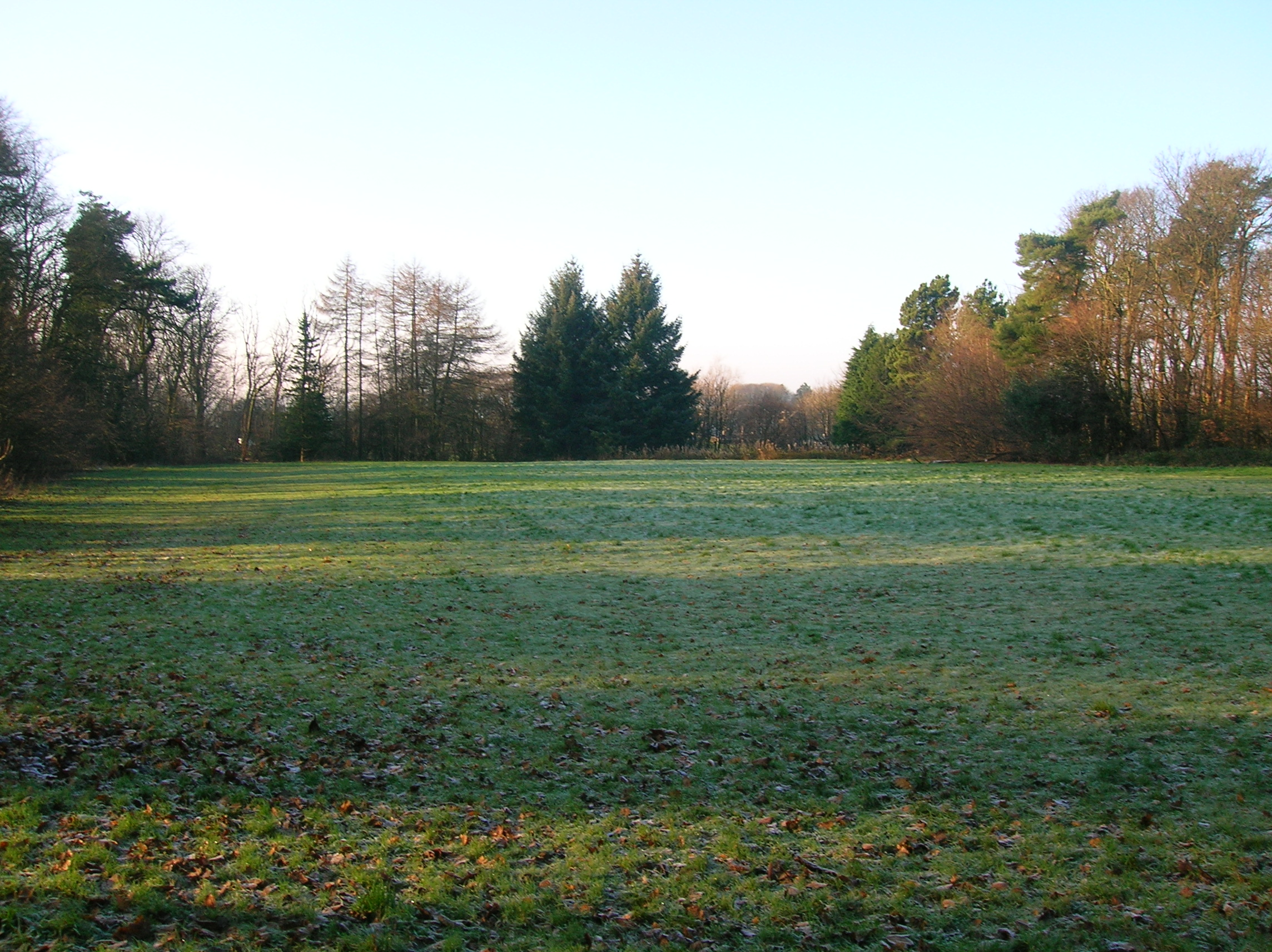
The 'High Field', old Hockey and rugby practice pitches site near the Geilsland Road side of the grounds55°44.760′N 4°37.439′W

Spier's had a great reputation for playing sports and it was the first school in Ayrshire to play rugby football, as R. Bruce Lockhart, the first headmaster, was a former Vice President of the Scottish Rugby Union. The first game was played at Marshalland on 30 October 1890. As stated, the school had a house system, with Cuff, Marshalland and Spier; providing competition on the school sports days held in June on the Marshalland playing fields. Tennis (girls only), cricket, hockey, net ball and golf were played and a quaint game called targette was played in the early days.

The Old Spierian Football Club, later the Old Spierian Rugby Club, came into existence in 1890. The Garnock Rugby Club came into existence in 1972 as a result of the closure of Spier's and Dalry schools. George G.H. Johnstone, a maths teacher at Spier's, had founded the rugby club for former pupils and continued his involvement until his death in 1973, at the age of 93. Old Spierians, A.Frew, J. H. Bruce Lockhart, and David Shedden were capped for Scotland.

The 7.28 acres (29,500 m^{2}) 'Marshland' (sic) playing fields are mainly used for football now and facilities are provided in the form of large metal trans-shipment containers based at the car park. A wooden games pavilion existed here in the days of the school.

== The World Wars ==
The school had an unofficial cadet corps in 1914 and donated money to the Belgian Refugee Fund in 1915 and it also endowed a hospital bed in 1918. In the Second World War part of the High Field was converted into a potato field as part of the "Dig for Victory" initiative.

Seventy Old Spierians made the supreme sacrifice and the war memorials were a central feature of the old school buildings. The memorial is now in storage at the North Ayrshire Museum in Saltcoats, awaiting a suitable location for re-erection. The school also had a Garden of Remembrance composed of a rose garden within a square of yew hedges and an internal path. This was under restoration by the YMBB youth group in 2012.

Role of honour for World War I and World War II

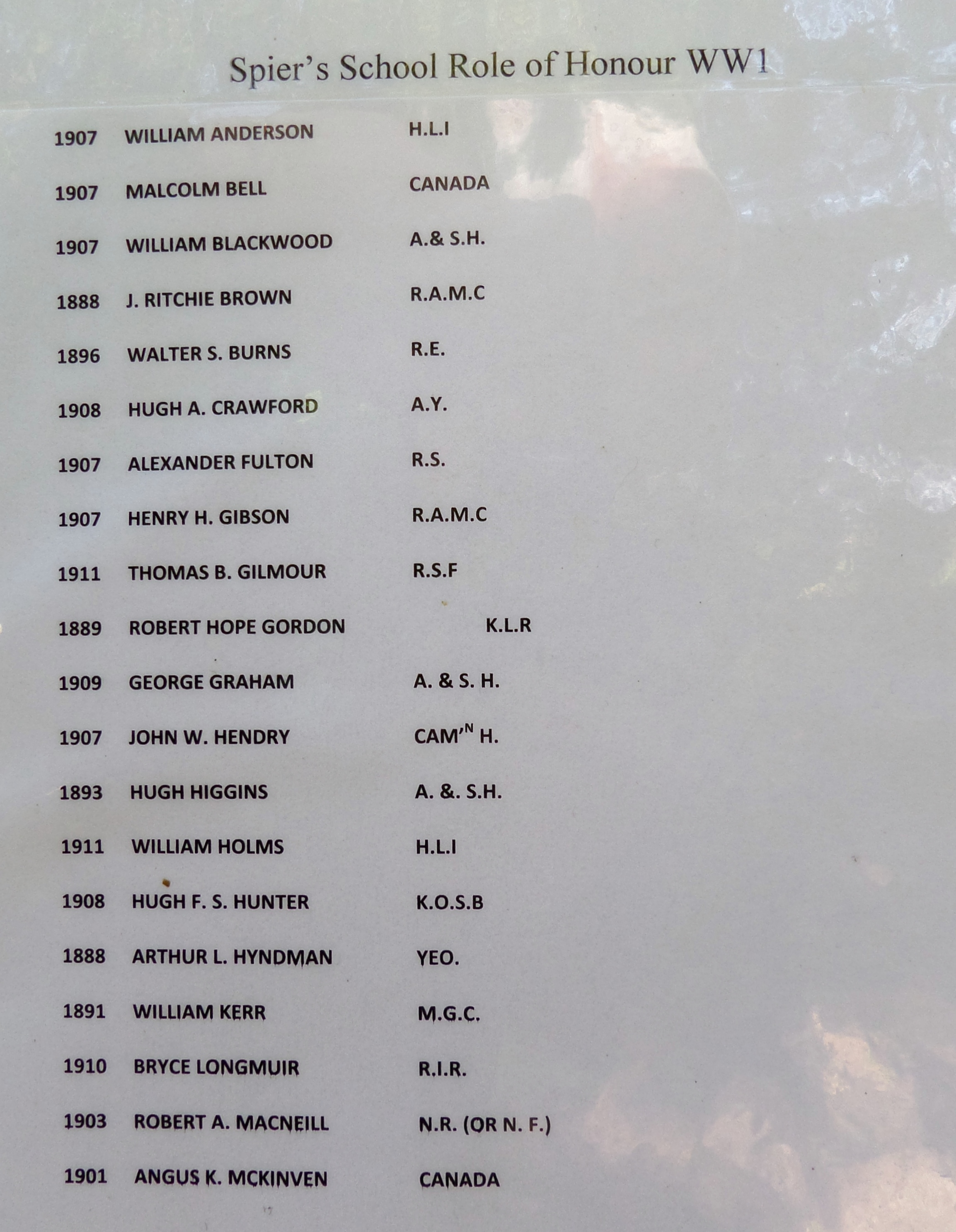

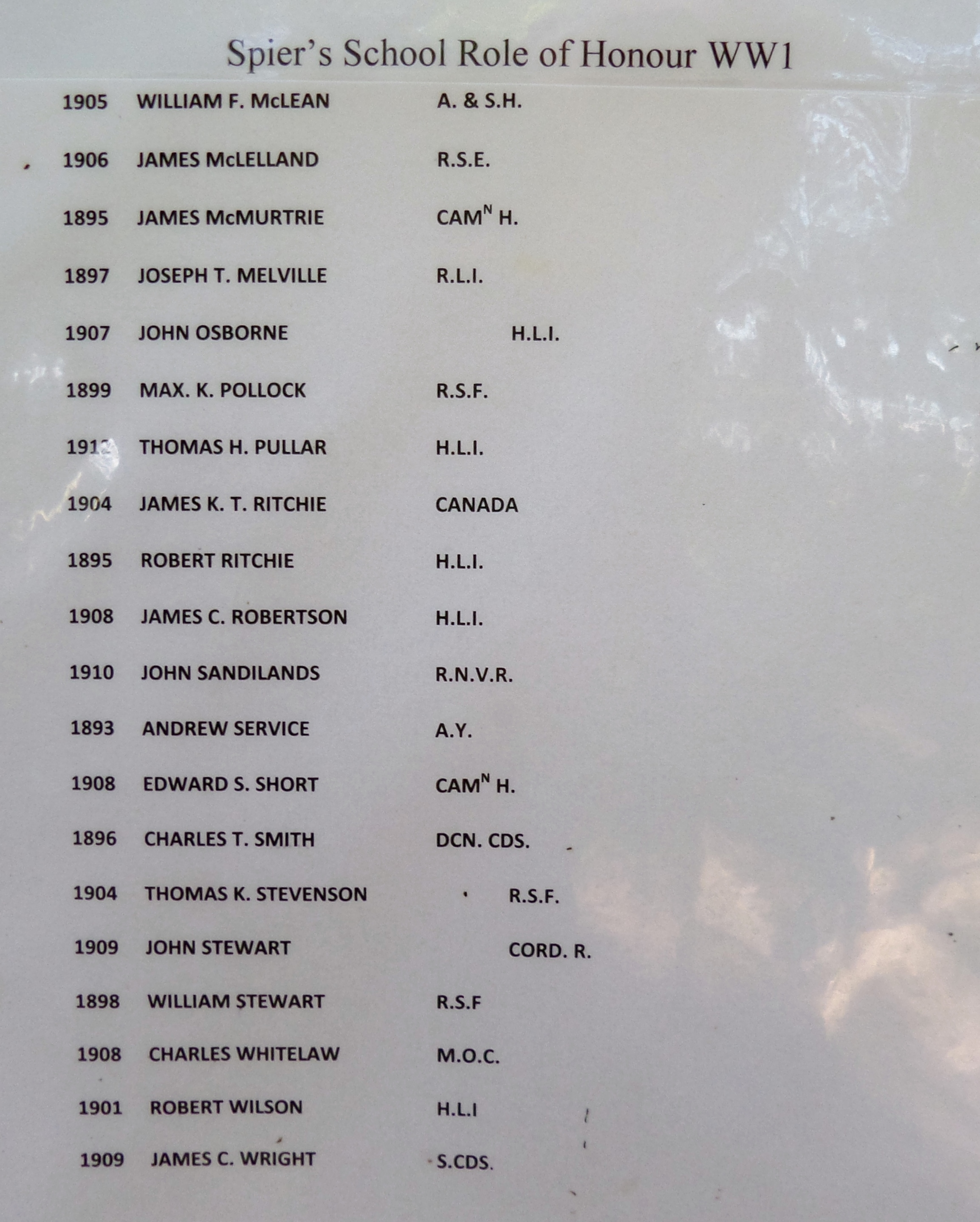

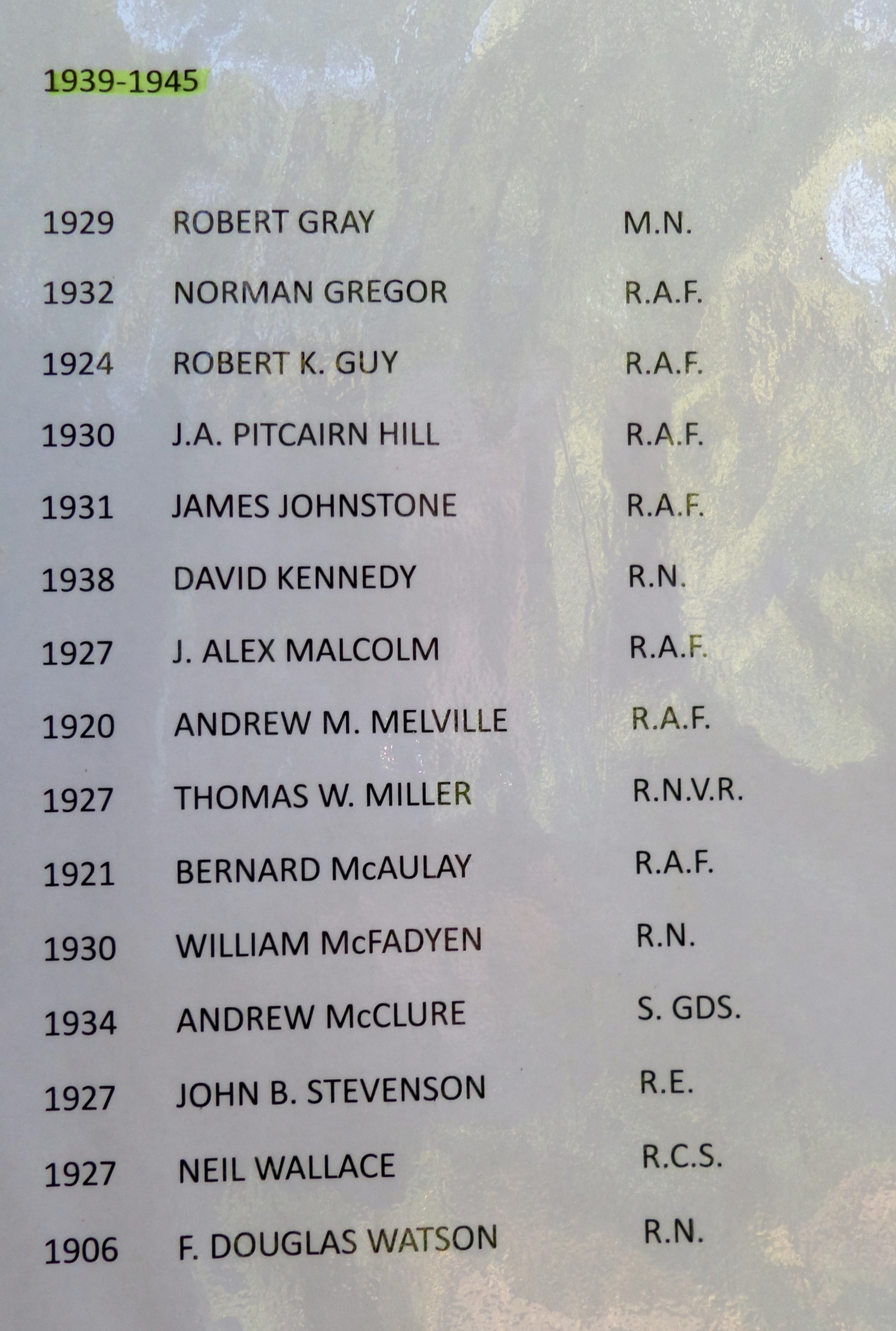

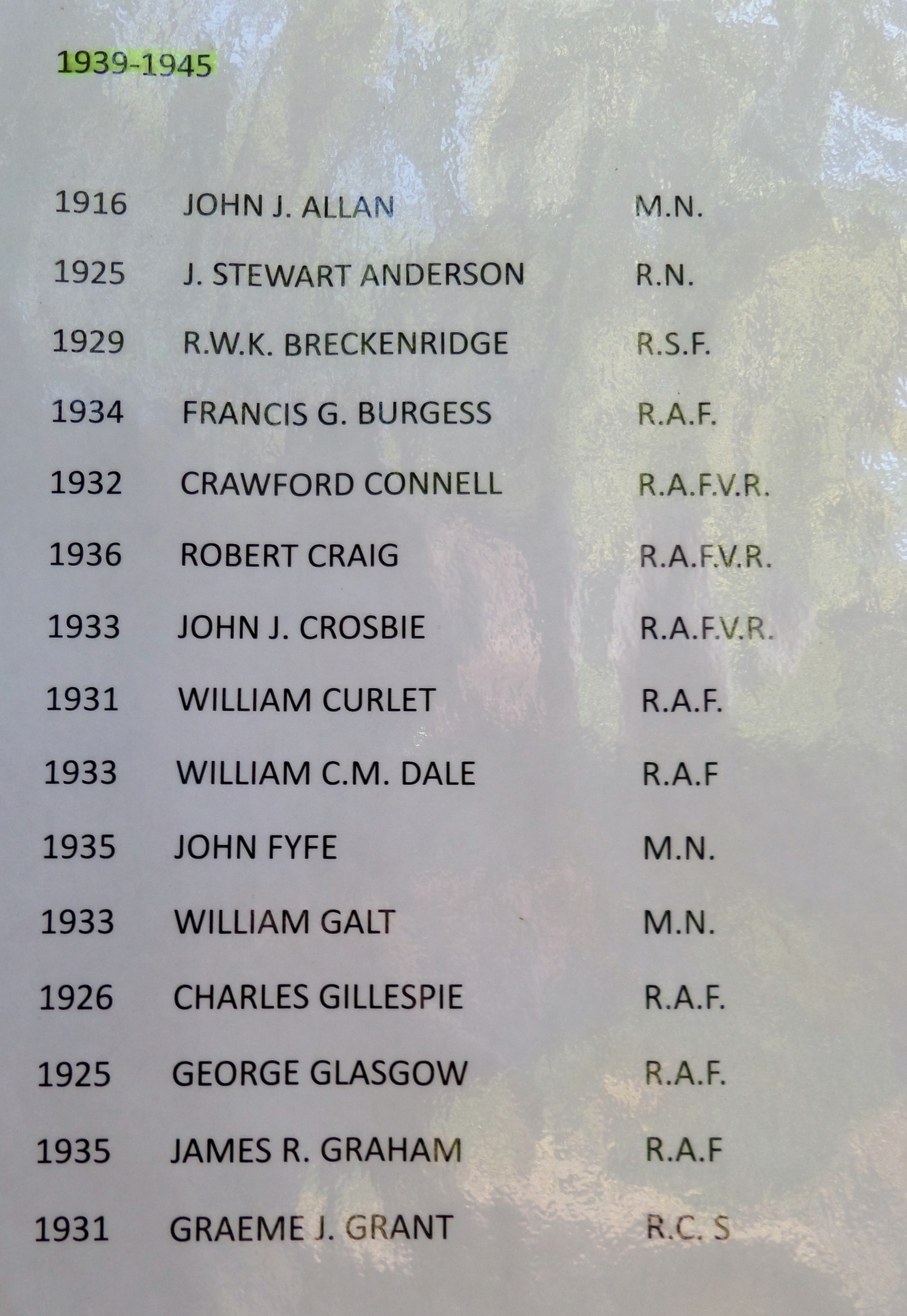

== The gardens and woodlands ==
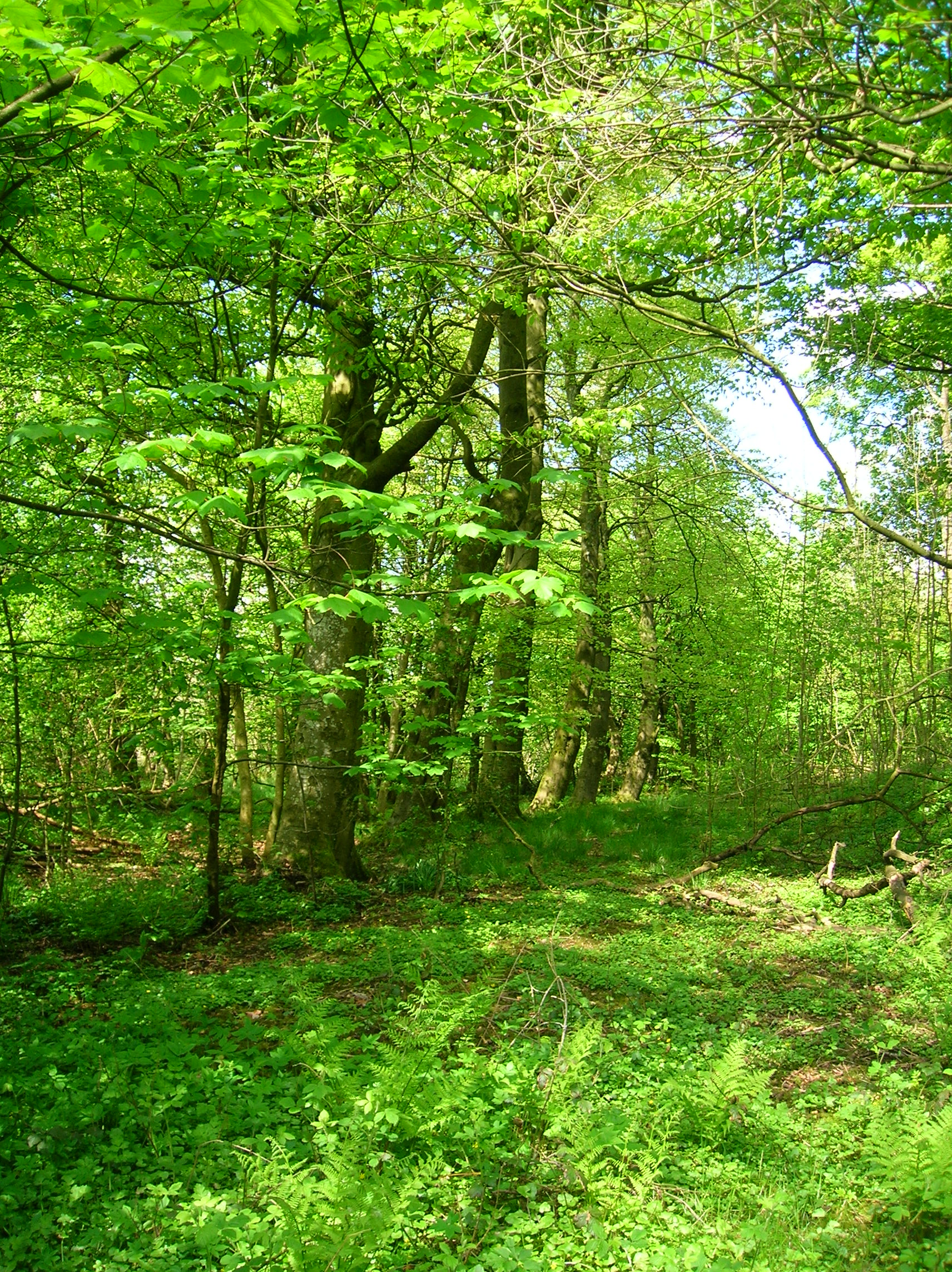
The 'Forbidden Path' between the girls' and the boys' entrance

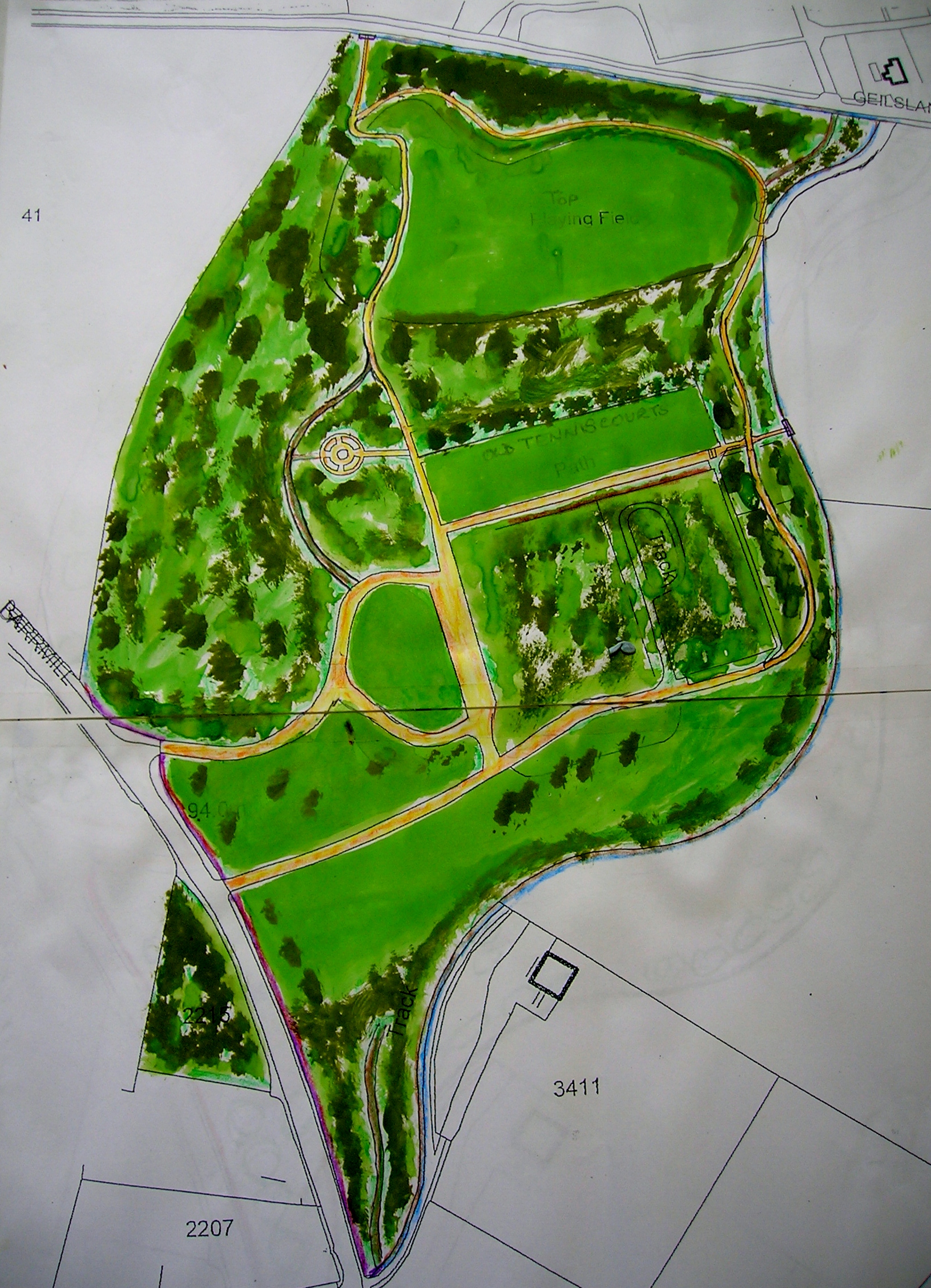
Spier's in 2011.

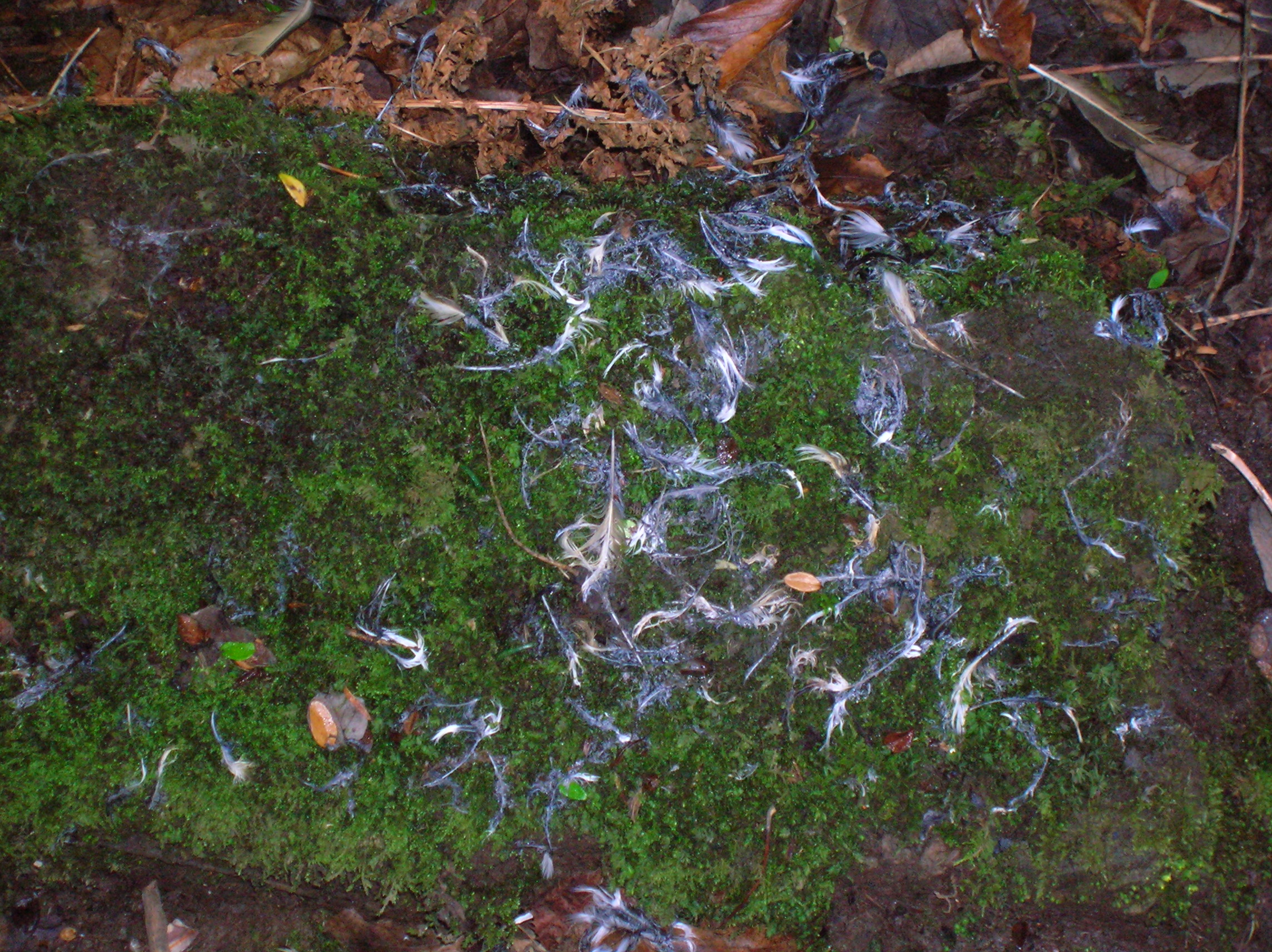
A bird of prey 'plucking post' in the grounds of the old school

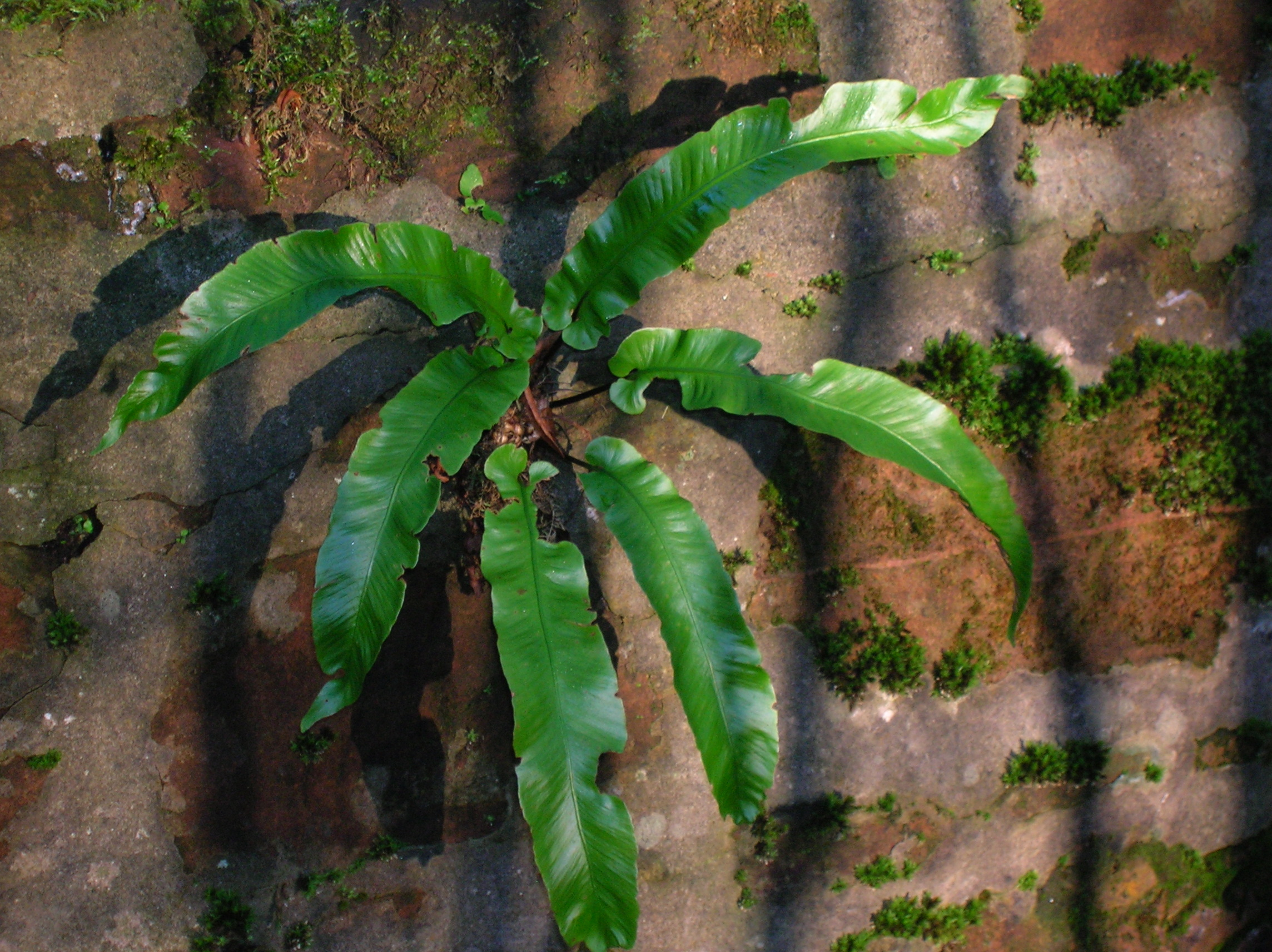
A Hart's-tongue fern (Phyllitis scolopendrium) growing in the lime mortar of an old wall

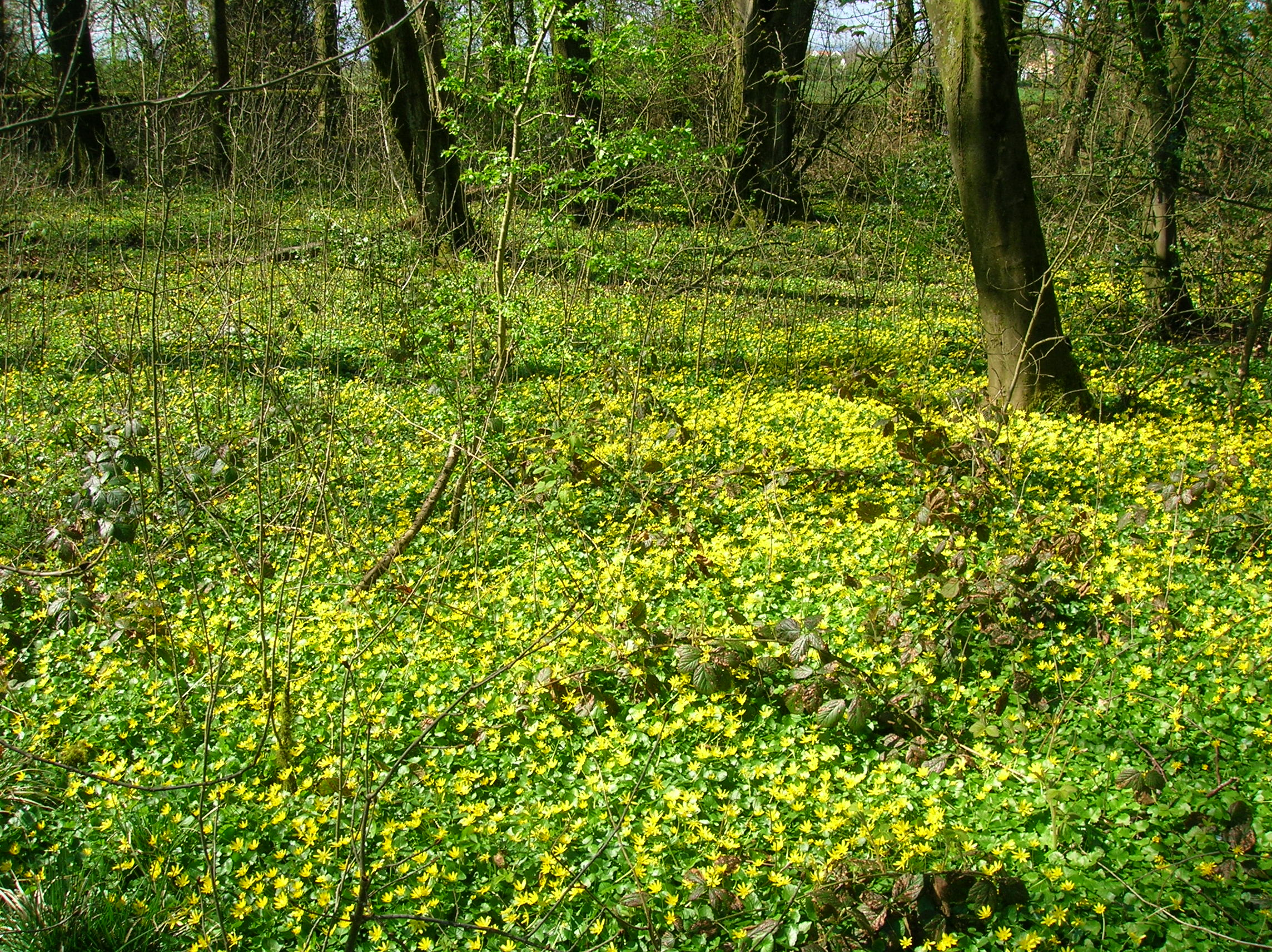
Celandine-dominated woodland in early spring

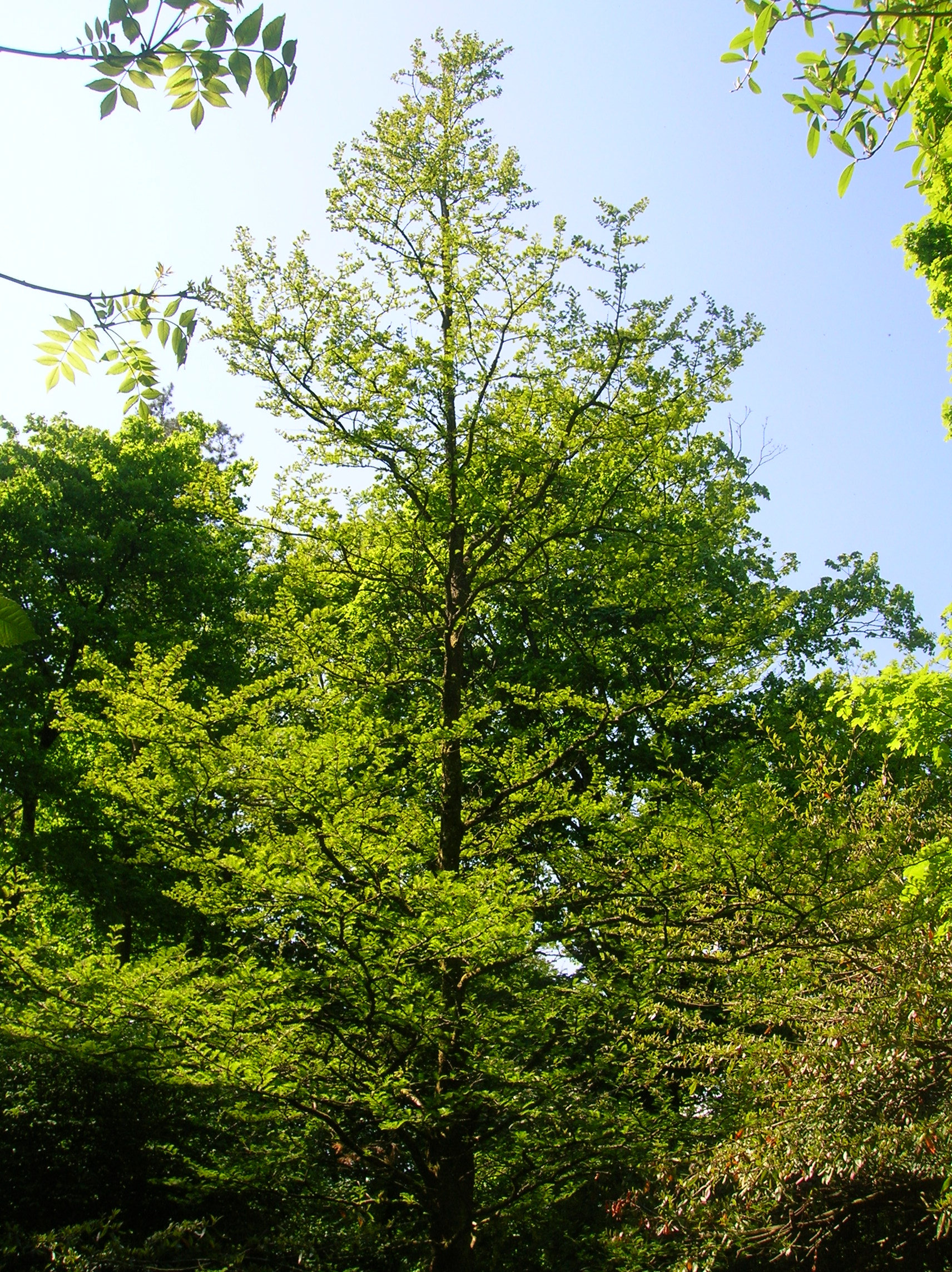
The Spier's dawn redwood

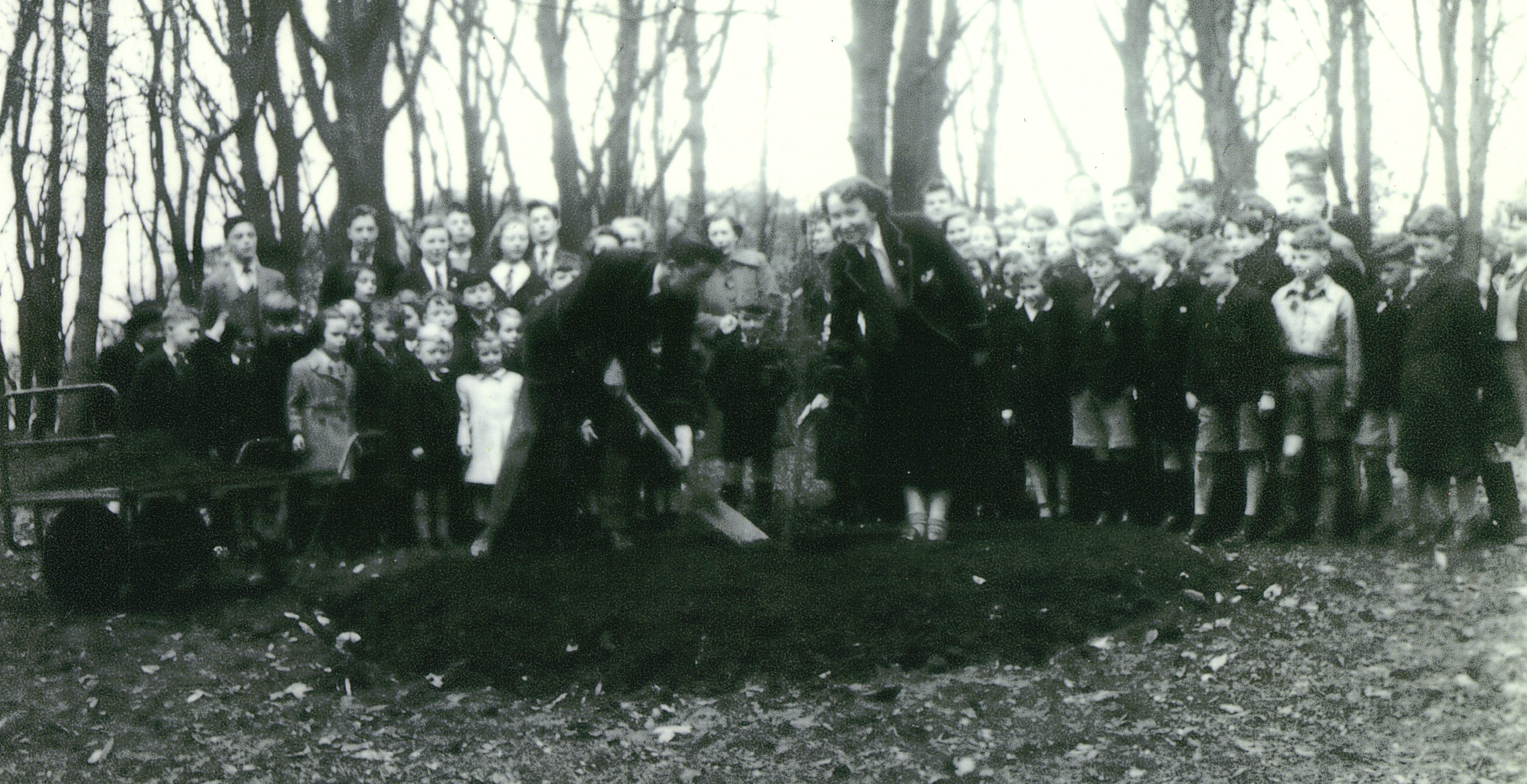
Planting the dawn redwood tree at the Coronation Garden in 1953.

The Royal Caledonian Horticultural Society list Spier's as an important designed landscape.

The Earl of Eglinton's head gardener at Eglinton Castle laid out the 16.53 acres (66,900 m^{2}) of policies (from the Latin word politus meaning embellished) and gardens. He used a variety of trees and shrubs, especially holly varieties, eventually producing a very fine setting for the school; much of the plantings remain to this day (2008). There were between 50 and 100 varieties of trees within the grounds of Spier's and they used to be labelled with their botanical names. The 1888 order for trees from Samson Nurseries survives and lists the trees ordered for the arboretum as 300 sycamores; 300 Scotch elm; 400 beech; 1000 Scotch fir (sic); 200 Austrian pine; 200 black spruce; 200 black spruce; 50 English elm; 200 Norway maple; 175 limes; 50 English oak; 50 turkey oak; 75 horse chestnut; 50 hornbeam; 200 weeping birch; 100 rhododendron; 100 rowans; and also ash and willows for the hedge.

The walled garden area, internally divided and later used for extra classroom space, was originally an orchard and Kitchen Garden; the entrance off the Terrace Walk at the old Tennis Lawns was used by the female pupils only. The path is described as a 'wheelbarrow road' and the plans for a 'Girls Garden' leading into the Girls' Court survive. The site near the Broadstone Arch with three sides formed from a yew hedge was the World War II Garden of Remembrance and now contains a labyrinth.

An order for the Kitchen Garden lists five espalier pear, six apple, one plum and two cherry varieties for the five foot high walls and twelve standard fruit trees for planting internally. In addition the Kitchen Garden contained gooseberries, blackcurrants, whitecurrants, redcurrants and raspberries.

A 'Coronation Garden' was established here in 1953. The site was close to the tennis lawns which lay next to the school on the Geilsland Road side.

This 1953 Coronation Garden was created with the central feature of the newly discovered "living fossil" tree, the dawn redwood. This tree is very slow growing; it was surrounded by a key shaped edged path network with other ornamental plantings. It was damaged at the top during a money raising drive to fell trees for firewood for sale.55°44.713′N 4°37.505′W

The altitude of the site is between 95 m and 100 m.

The area of woodland near the back entrance to Geilsland School is dominated by a ground layer of ivy and was known as the 'Ivy Palace' to the pupils of Spier's.

The ornamental plantings include the laurel-leaf holly (Ilex aquifolia laurifolia), Highclere holly, (Ilex aquifolia hodginsii), horse chestnut, cedar of Lebanon, yew, the large leaved Persian ivy, (Hedera colchica), cherry laurel, lime, holly, Scot's fir, dawn redwood, ash, monkey puzzle, great leopard's-bane (Dornicum pardalianches), turkey oak, Portuguese laurel and Rhododendron ponticum.

A fine boundary wall surrounds the 16-acre (65,000 m^{2}) site, punctuated by gates which led onto the track which ran on the field's side or onto Barrmill and Geilsland Roads respectively. This wall was extensively repaired and rebuilt by a volunteer, Derek Graham, 2010-11.

The Spier's Trust also owns 48.26 acres (195,300 m^{2}) of grazing land adjacent to the school grounds, including the High Field of 7.25 hectares lying within the school grounds.

The locals know the Powgree as the Geilsland Burn and boys used to play a game of jumping across it from the Broadstone Bridge area down to Marshalland Bridge. The girls used to play in a small area nearby called the 'Fairy Glen.' Robert Aitken on his map of 1827 gives the name as Polgree Burn.

A small cottage near Broadstone Bridge stood near to an old mill and was called 'Crooked Dam' as marked on the 1850s OS map.

== The Spier's Trust ==
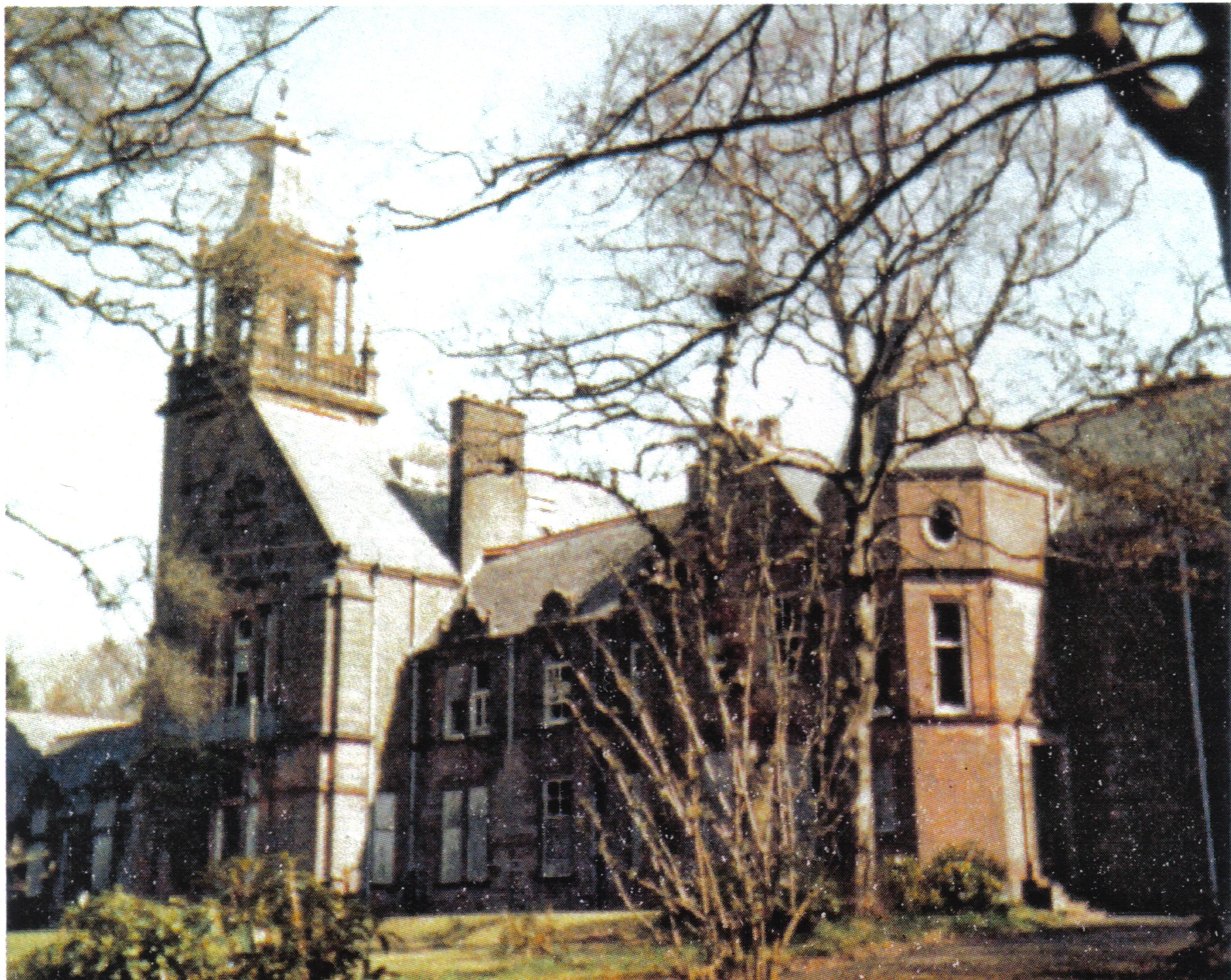
Spier's shortly before demolition

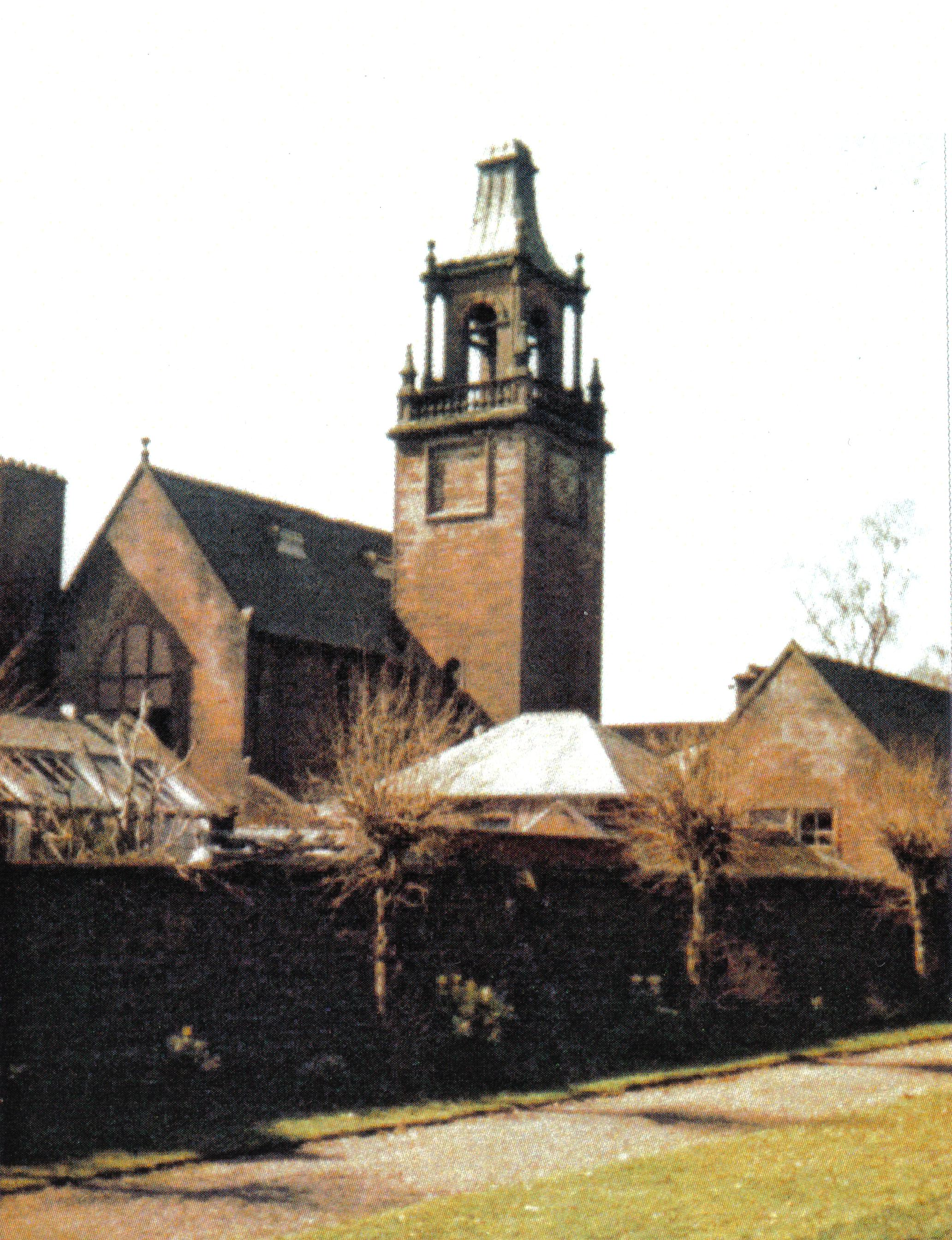
The school shortly before demolition

The trust was founded in 1991 by Mr Jack Spier for the administration of Spier's and for the provision of educational grants and bursaries within the local area of benefit, this being the parishes of Beith, Dalry, Dunlop, Kilbirnie and Neilston. The Trust derives its income from the investment proceeds of the capital of the Trust and from the rental derived from letting for grazing 48.26 acres (195,300 m^{2}) of land adjacent to the former school grounds. The Spiers Trust committee meet twice a year to give out small bursaries to qualifying local students. The Trust committee is made up of the local councillors from Beith, Dalry and Kilbirnie. The total area was 76.3 acres (309,000 m^{2}). North Ayrshire Council now lease the school grounds from the Trust for a nominal rent.

== Diamond Jubilee Time Capsule ==
In October 2011 Gateside Primary School pupils placed a 'Wish for the Future' time capsule in the Diamond Jubilee Wood site. This is registered with the International Time Capsule Society (ITCS) at Oglethorpe University in the US. It is due to be opened on 18 June 2037, in the 150 anniversary year of the school's foundation. The pupils have maps of the location and the ITCS have the coordinates.

== The Spier's Cholera Pit ==
In 1829 and 1834 cholera broke out in Beith and although "clothes were burned, bedding fumigated, stairs and closes whitewashed, a nurse who was a veteran of the Dalry outbreak was engaged and a ban placed on entertainments at funerals." There were 100 cases in September 1834, 205 people were eventually affected with 105 deaths. Some of the people were buried in the parish churchyard, but others were buried in a field, in a cholera pit close to what became Spier's School, on the little common south-west of where the Geilsland Road meets the Powgree Burn. Robert Spier, the father of John Spier, was a member of the local health board. The pit had a mound of soil over it at one time however the farmers gradually ploughed this down to the field level.

== Diamond Jubilee Wood ==
In 2012 members of the communities of the Garnock Valley planted a new wood at Spier's to commemorate the Diamond Jubilee of Queen Elizabeth II. Beith Primary School carried out the major part of the planting thanks to the Woodland Trust who donated over 400 trees.

== The Spier's Labyrinth and War memorial ==
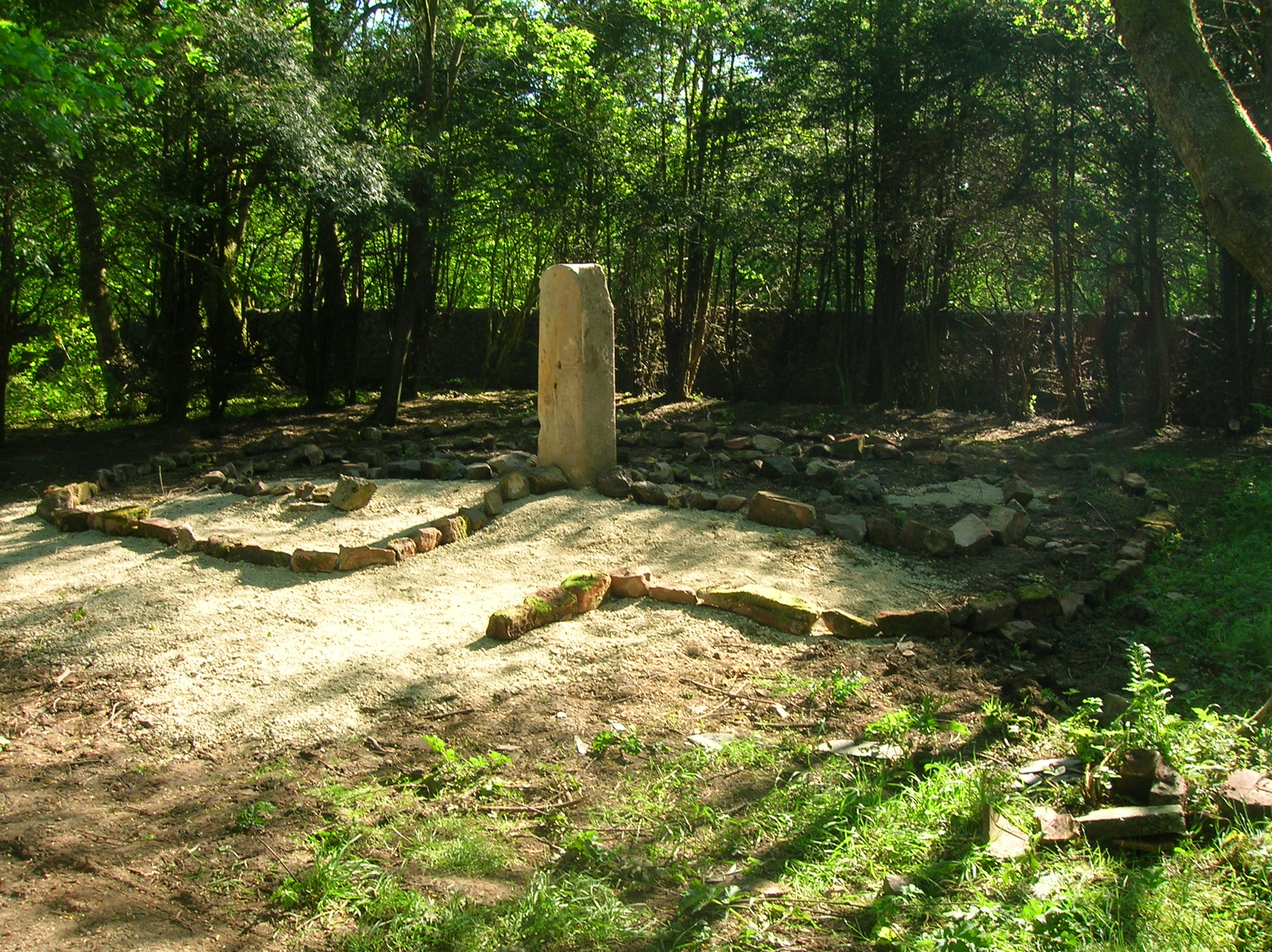
The Spier's labyrinth and the War Memorial in the Garden of Remembrance.

Seventy ex-pupils from Spier's died in the First and Second World Wars. A War Memorial was located within the school, however since the demolition of the school no publicly accessible memorial has existed and the old rose garden at the 'Garden of Remembrance' has long been overgrown. In 2012 an old Spier's gatepier was collected, cleaned and placed within the old garden as a War Memorial. The group Youth Making Beith Better (YMBB) created a labyrinth around the standing stone War Memorial as a religious memorial - the 'one true path', etc. as found in several cathedrals and in other religious contexts.

== Natural history ==
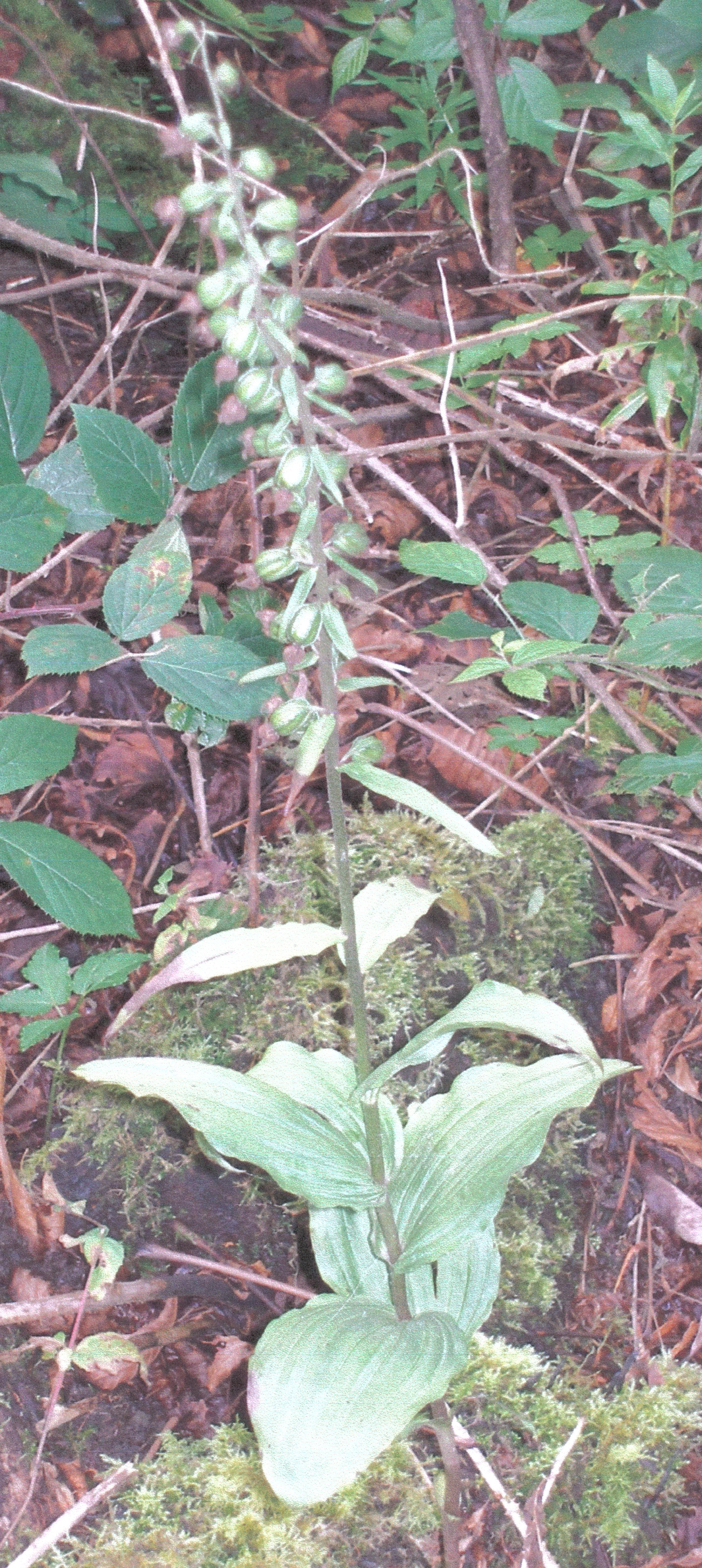
A broad-leaved helleborine orchid growing in the old school grounds

The grounds had previously been the farmland of Marshalland farm and the evidence from OS maps does not show the presence of any old woodland after the mid-eighteenth century. Several orchid species are present and a few of the indicators species of older woodland. Ivy dominates the ground flora near the Geilsland Road to the extent that almost all other species are eliminated.55°44.781′N 4°37.384′W

== Wildlife Site status ==
The Scottish Wildlife Trust (SWT) have surveyed the grounds and recorded 19 species of birds and 136 species of plants. The grounds have a rich fungal flora, partly due to the quantity of fallen timber. This is exemplified by the presence of parrot waxcap (Hygrocybe psittacina), an uncommon species. The biodiversity and other considerations have resulted in the grounds qualifying as an official SWT Wildlife Site, code NS353532. This ensures a greater degree of protection against any possibly insensitive developments that might be proposed at any future date. In 2010 a specimen of the Arran whitebeam (Sorbus pseudofennica) a rare species unique to Scotland, was found at Spier's. In 2011 the exceptionally rare common broomrape (Orobanche minor) was discovered growing at Spier's and has been the subject of a conservation project since that date.

The grounds also qualify as a Local Biodiversity Site (LBS). The Scottish Ornithologists Club (SOC) have identified Spier's as a site for birdwatching with, amongst others, tits, finches, thrushes, greater spotted woodpecker, chiffchaff, blackcap, willow and garden warbler. An unusual bird migrant record for the school grounds in the 1920s is that of the mealy redpoll (Carduelis flammea flammea). It breeds across the northern parts of North America and Eurasia.

== North Ayrshire Council ==
The grounds are occasionally visited by rangers from the North Ayrshire Ranger Service (District), based at Eglinton Country Park. NACs Streetscene (Grounds Maintenance) Section maintain the grounds of the parkland, mowing grass, removing fallen trees and they also use the site for In Service Training sessions.

In August 2012 Elma Murray, NAC Chief Executive; Joan Sturgeon, Provost; Robert Barr, Deputy provost; and local councillors visited Spier's in recognition of the restoration carried out by community groups. A copper beech tree was planted by the provost to commemorate the visit.

== The Spier's Arboretum ==
Before the Spier family built the school that bore their name, the ancient farmhouse and its lands were called Marshalland. Old maps show that apart from a small patch of woodland around the farm and outbuildings, all the rest was open fields with hedgerow boundaries, probably containing a few mature trees such as beech, ash, birch, and oak. The only other feature at that time was a track leading to the freshwater spring that contributes to the Marshalland Burn close to its source near the Geilsland Road.

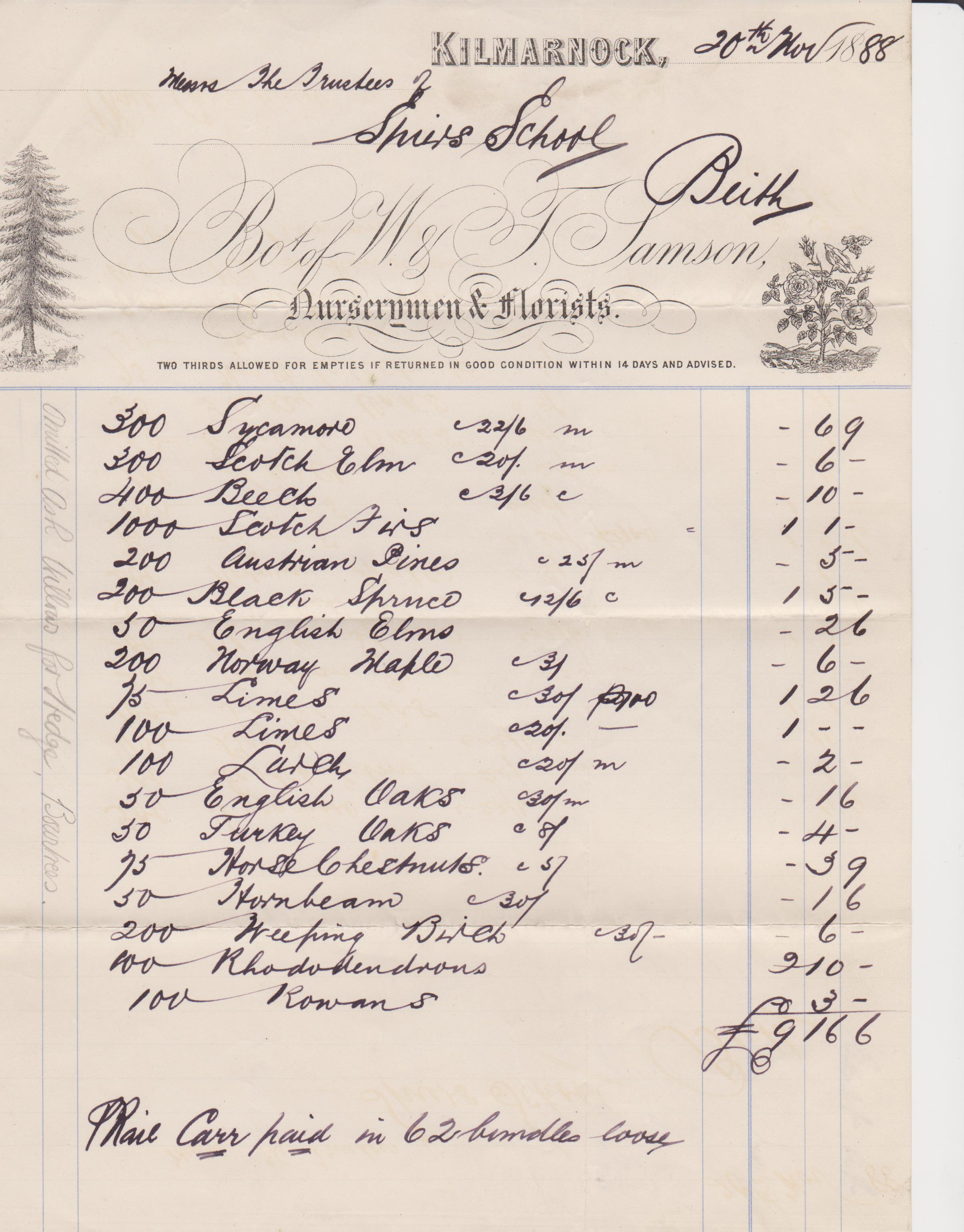
The original 1888 order for trees at Spier's

In 1888, Spier's School was opened and thanks to the Earl of Eglinton's head gardener, aided by others such as Mr. W. F. Love, the school grounds were planted up with a specially selected list of trees and shrubs creating an arboretum. The tradition of enhancing the grounds continues to this day with memorial and celebratory tree plantings and along the way notable additions have been the exceedingly rare Arran whitebeam, the dawn redwood at the 1953 Coronation Garden, the Camperdown Elm and the Queen Elizabeth II Silver Jubilee Wood of 2012.

The tree order from Samson's Nursery of 20 November 1888 still survives and lists seventeen tree species, but with a total of 3350 trees planted at that time, costing the sum of £9 16s 6d. A fruit trees and shrubs order for the walled garden also survives, listing a total of 371 pears, apples, plums, cherries, gooseberries, currants and raspberries, with several varieties of each.

The walled garden was adapted to house additional classrooms and a gymnasium, resulting in the loss of the orchard, etc. Only a few self-seeded gooseberries and raspberries survive from the original plantings. After its closure in 1972, the school grounds received less maintenance and after the demolition of the school buildings in 1984 even the school 'footprint' itself became a woodland as native colonising trees such as willow, birch, and alder took hold there, providing however a site for the unusual and parasitic broomrape (Orobanche minor) plant, one of Scotland's rarest plants.

In 2010, NAC Streetscene and the North Ayrshire Ranger Service, later joined by the Friends of Spiers (FoS), started a restoration programme that resulted in a network of all-weather and 'user-friendly' paths, followed by a survey of all 812 trees at Spier's and the removal of any deemed dangerous, many felled tree trunks and their stumps however being left as a habitat for insects, fungi, etc.

Extensive tree planting projects involving schools and youth groups were complemented by the planting by NAC Streetscene of a mix of exotic tree species, together with trees selected to further enhance the diversity of the Spier's Arboretum that have been provided through FoS and their 'Memorial' and 'Celebratory' tree planting schemes.

The Spier's Arboretum has a secure future with the prospect of additional species reaching maturity, such as aspen, toffee apple (katsura) tree, handkerchief tree, Wellingtonia, Wollemi pine, holm oak, walnut, fastigiate beech, sessile oak, monkey puzzle, and juniper that will give a total of around fifty tree species in the arboretum.

== Leaflets, Facebook, etc. ==
A tree trail and accompanying leaflet were created in 2013 by the Youth Making Beith Better (YMBB) group to expand the information in the Spier's Old School Grounds leaflet. A Facebook page 'Spier's - Natural and Local History' exists for the benefit of visitors and supporters. The grounds have their own TripAdvisor page that attracts visitor comments and photographs.

== Memorials to John Spier and Spier's school ==
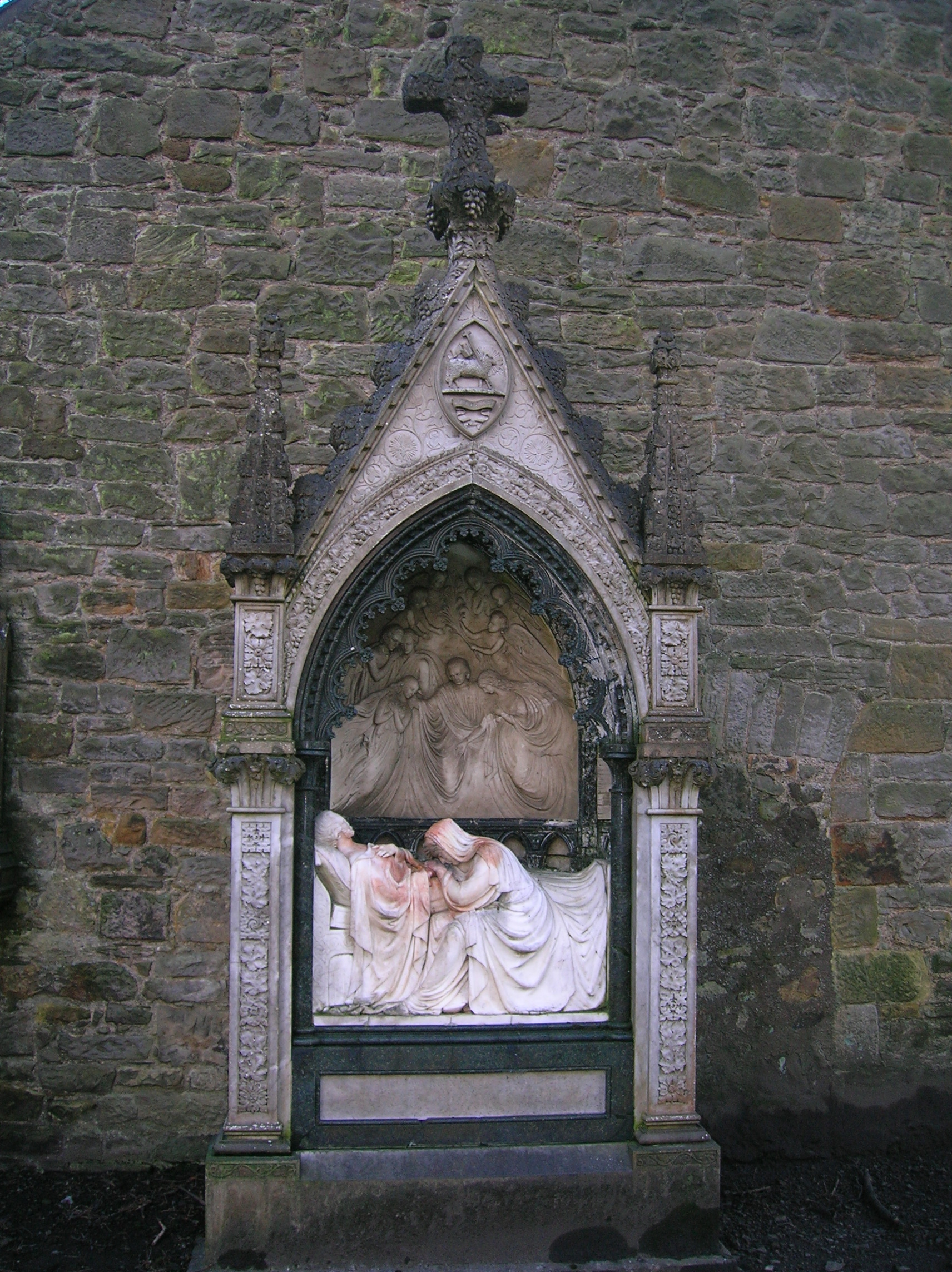
The John Spier memorial, by William Brodie, now at Beith Auld Kirk. It had been in the Spier's school yard.

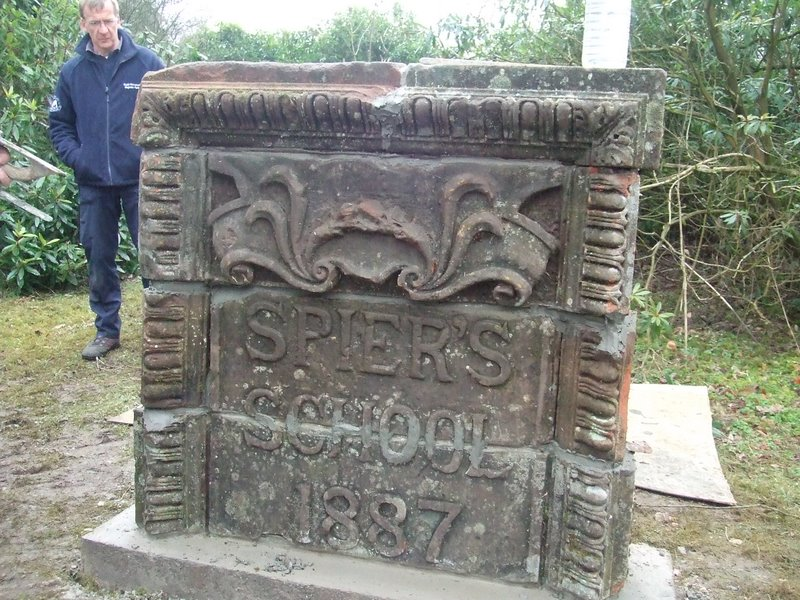
The Spier's Commemorative Wall under construction in the former school grounds in 2010

The Spier's Memorial, now at Beith Auld Kirk, described as a "Monumental Shrine" in the RSA Exhibition of 1861, was designed by Frederick Thomas Pilkington, and sculpted by William Brodie. It was originally in the school yard, but later it was incorporated into Campbell Douglas & Sellars school building.

The school is remembered in 'Spiers Avenue' on the Kilbirnie Road. Part of the unmetalled road that runs from Fairholm (Craigvue) down towards Craig House is known as Spiersland Way; the latter part is known as Roughwood Road after the farm of that name. A Spier's care Home also exists in Beith.

Beith Primary school has a 'Spier's Library', a painting of the school and a stained glass window depicting the alternative design of the school, never built, but used on the Governor's official seal. It is dated 1870, 18 years before the school was completed. Gateside Primary school has a Spier's House as well as a Cuff House.

The old War Memorial from Spier's is presently in storage at the North Ayrshire Museum in Saltcoats; the John Spier memorials were moved to the Old Kirk in Beith and the large statue of John Spier's was moved to Garnock Academy.

Garnock Academy holds the details of the grant of a Coat of Arms to Spier's, a number of stained glass windows, a mineralogical collection and the rector's old table and chairs from the study. It may also hold the Governor's seal.

== Geilsland ==
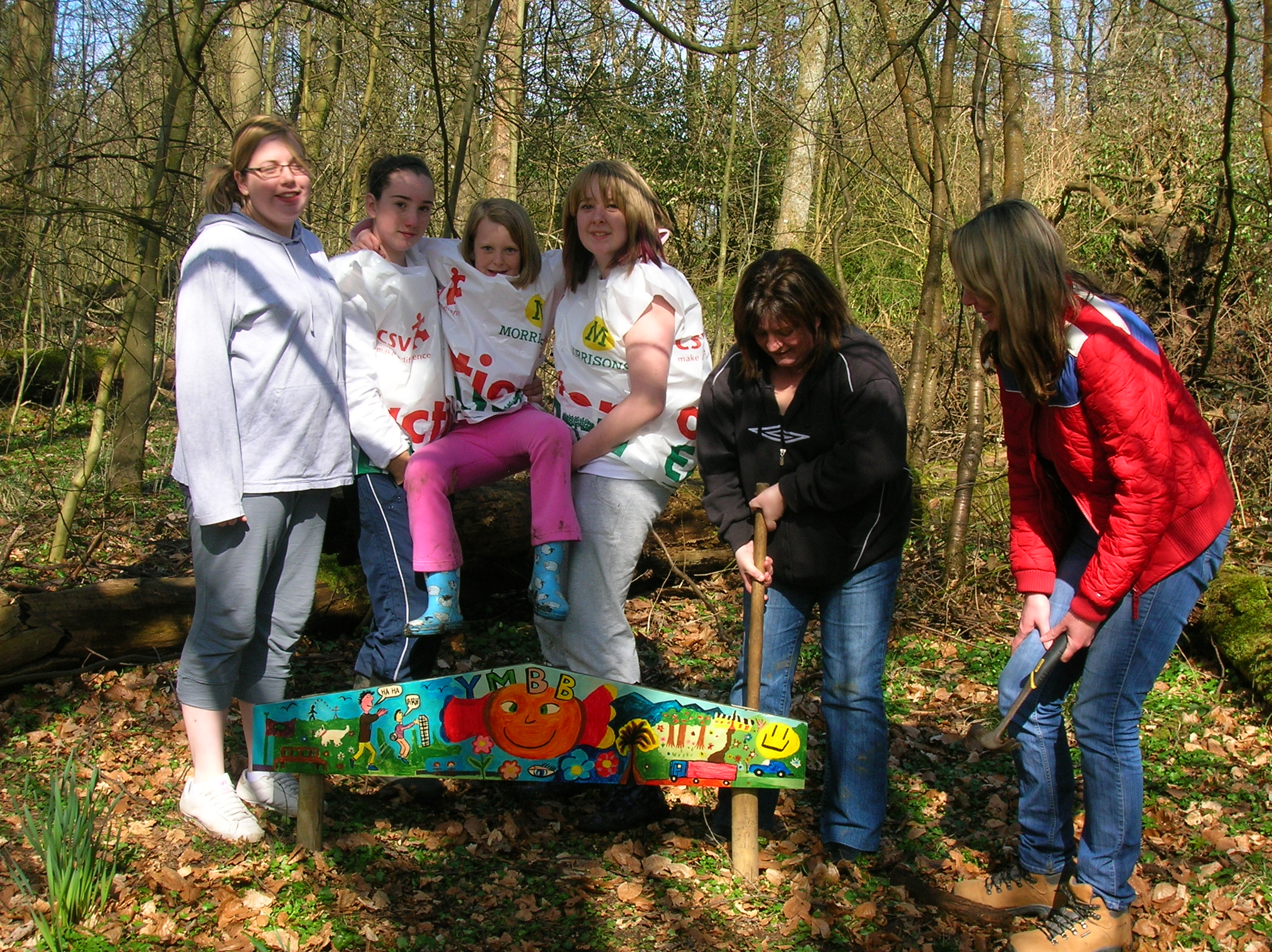
Youth Making Beith Better at the 2010 Spier's CITO Event

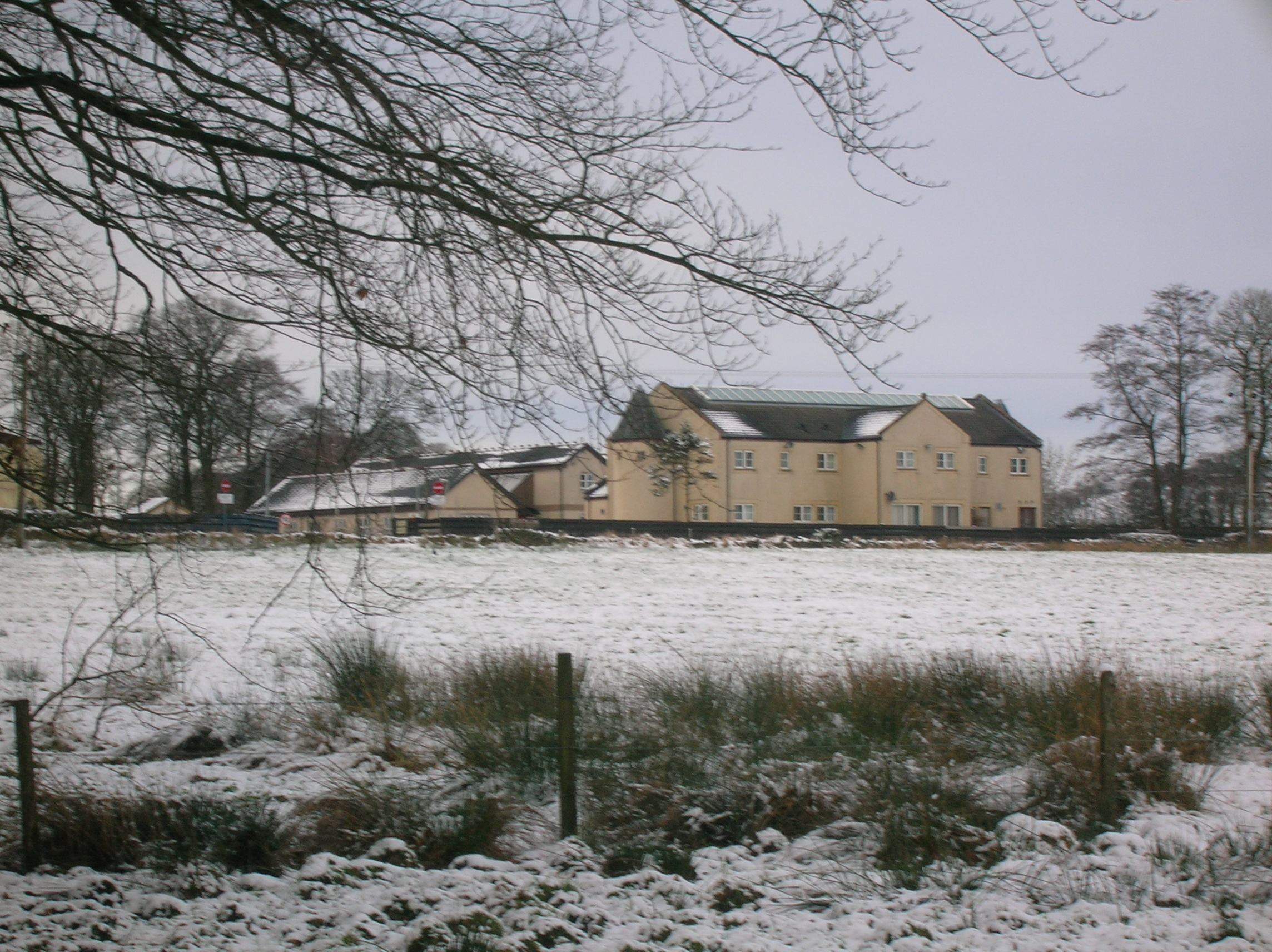
Geilsland school from Spier's

This was a half merk land, part of the 4 merk land of Marsheland, in the Barony of Braidstone. It was sold in four lots. In 1867, two of these lots were purchased by Wiliam Fulton Love, writer and bank agent in Beith. He built a handsome villa, in the domestic gothic style, and enclosed and planted with much taste, 5 acres (20,000 m^{2}) around the villa. This property is now part of Geilsland school, run by the Church of Scotland under its 'Crossreach' initiative. The name is pronounced 'Jillsland' locally. The origin of the name may refer to a gil or gyll, referring to a cleft or ravine as found at the 'Fairy Glen' where the Powgree Burn cuts through the fields.

Pupils from Geilsland have helped to improve the grounds of Spier's by carrying out conservation projects.

In 2015 the Church of Scotland ceased to use Geilsland as a school and it was sold to the Beith Development Community Trust Ltd.

== Gateside Village ==
The village of Gateside lies close to Broadstone and Geilsland. It has a fine pub, primary school, plant nursery, Millennium garden, and the Isobel Patrick of Trearne Memorial Hall. Until recently it had a smithy. Trearne House stood nearby and was demolished, the site is now a large limestone quarry.

== Industrial and social archaeology ==
=== The Moot Hill ===
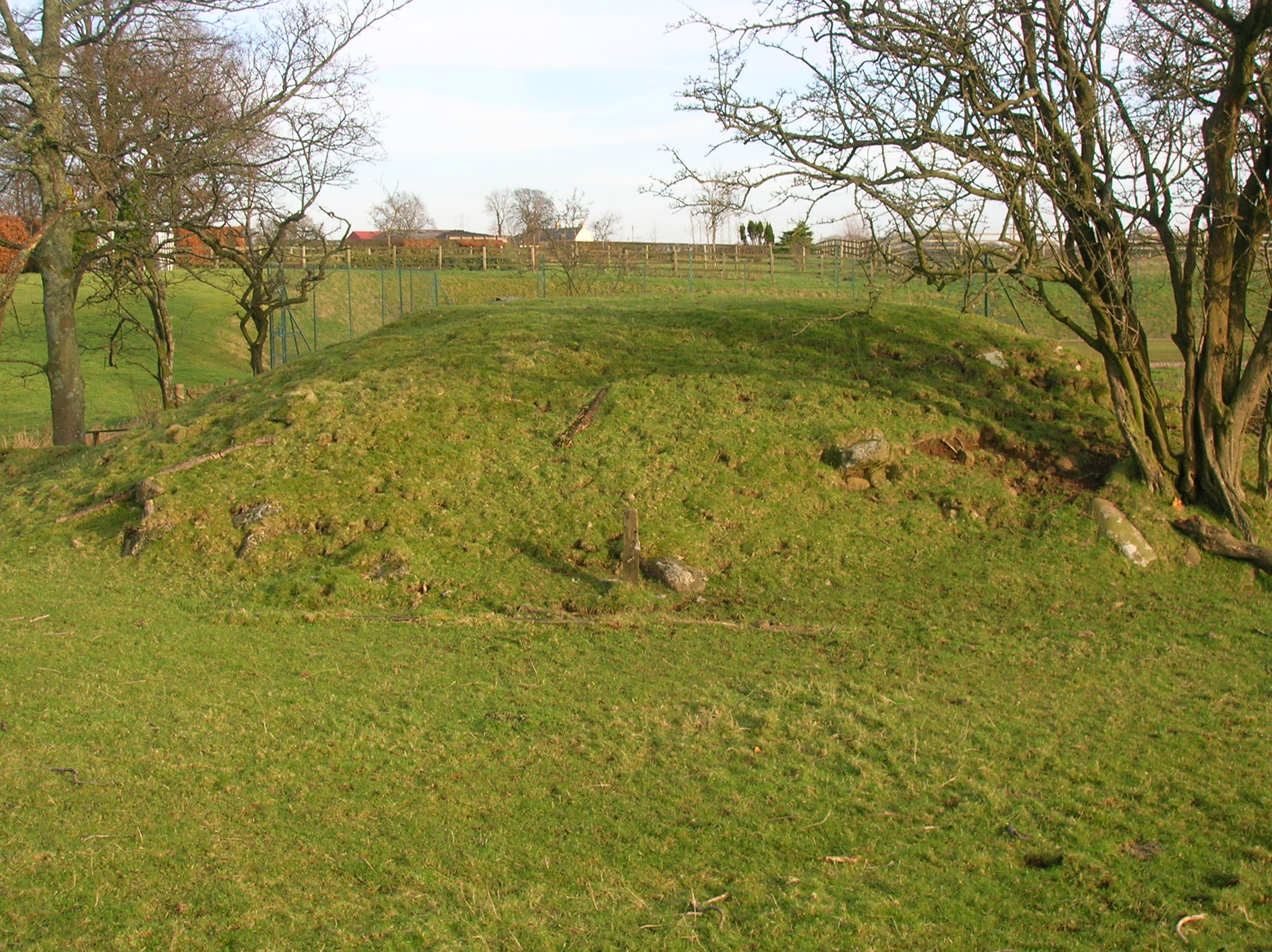
The Court Hill of the Abbot of Kilwinning near Gateside village

A Moot hill or Court Hill survives near Boghall in the old Barony of Beith. Dobie states that the Abbot of Kilwinning used it to administered justice to his vassals and tenants. It is a sub-oval, flat-topped mound, situated at the foot of a small valley. A number of large stones are visible in the sides of the mound. It is turf-covered, situated on a low outcrop, and is mostly an artificial work. It pre-dates the channelling of the burn which detours around it, the mound was probably isolated in this once marshy outflow of the former Boghall Loch (see NS35SE 14). It does not seem to lie in the area identified by Smith.

=== Quarrying ===
A sandstone quarry existed near to Marshalland farm and several sizeable limekilns and limestone quarries lay towards Broadstone; marble was found at Broadstone.

=== Broadstone castle ===
The ruins of Braidstone or Broadstone Castle remained until about 1850. but when Broadstonehall Farm buildings were being rebuilt, the castle was pulled down and its stones used in the building works; the Broadstone Crags, the site of the castle, remain however.

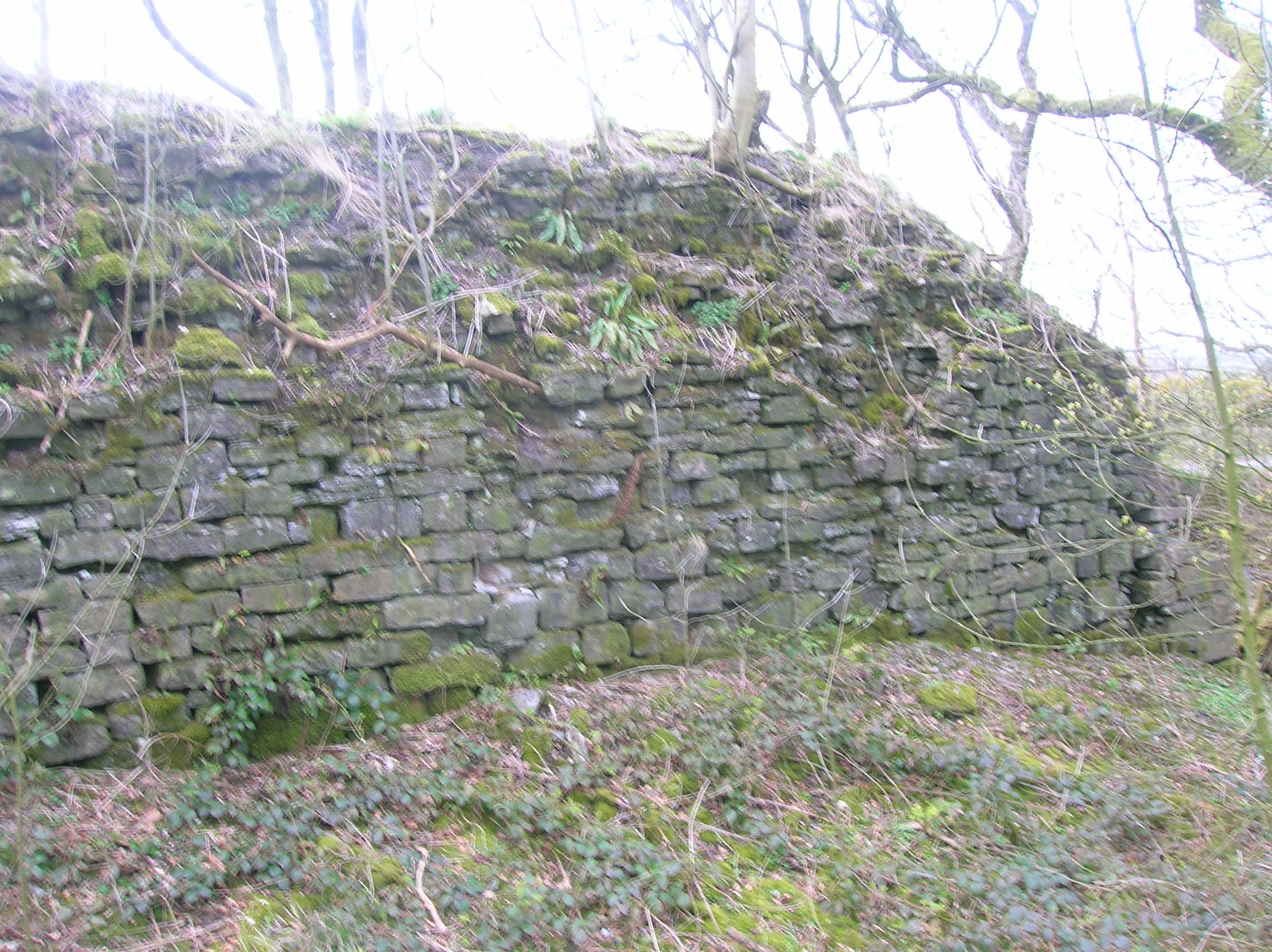
A view of the Broadstone lime kiln side wall

=== Broadstone or Hillhead Limekilns ===
The OS maps for 1858 show that the 'Hillhead Railway' ran to Broadstone quarry from Barkip Junction on the Ayrshire and Lanarkshire Railway branchline to Kilbirnie. At first sidings and a transfer system existed with a weighing machine at what was to become Brackenhills railway station, later a direct junction was laid. The line did not survive into the 20th century. The road nearby is still known as 'Reek Street'.

== Geology ==
Several large fallen trees at Spier's Old School Grounds have their roots embedded in rock which is derived from an old lava flow known as a 'dike,' one of a 'swarm' that exist locally. The solid geology of the Beith area is dominated by rocks such as limestone, coal, and also whinstone, an igneous basalt. The whinstone is therefore derived from volcanic activity and often shows itself as 'dikes' which are usually linear seams of hardened lava which was originally pushed up through the overlying limestone or coal. Coal miners were greatly inconvenienced by these hard dikes.

The basalt at Spier's has many distinctive holes or bubbles, known as vesicles. These formed when gases such as steam and carbon dioxide escaped as the compressive pressure got less in the molten rock as the lava reached the surface. The largest numbers of bubbles occur when the hardened skin of the lava surface prevented the bubbles from rising to the surface and bursting. Olivine crystal faces are visible, a mineral rich in silica, iron and magnesium. The size of the faces shows that the lava cooled relatively slowly, allowing the crystals time to 'grow'.

Spier's is close to the limestone quarries of Broadstone, Hillhead, Middleton, Dockra and Trearne. Whinstone has been quarried along a dike at Barrmill and is still quarried (2011) at Loanhead.

== DM Beith ==
A large Defence Munitions (DM) centre is located at Beith. The site was originally developed in 1943 as a conventional Royal Naval Armaments Depot, munitions store, for the Royal Navy. It now processes and stores Spearfish, Storm Shadow, Tomahawk and Brimstone missiles. The school lay within the 'Exclusion Zone', limiting new housing developments, etc.

== Marshalland Burn ==
This burn rises from springs within Spier's and runs under the road and field to emerge on the boundary of the Marshalland Playing Fields before entering the Powgree Burn near the old railway bridge at the 'T' junction for the DM Beith site. Polish prisoners of war in World War II used to collect their water from the Marshalland Well close to Bellscauseway and the carbonated water factory at this site may have used these waters to produce 'cooling and temperance drinks'. This enterprise was established in 1891 by Mr T. Murray and produced soda water, aerated water, seltzer, potass, magnesia, lemonade, ginger beer and ginger ale.

== The Lands of Roughwood ==
The Spiersland Way is an old toll road that runs down to Burnside Cottage, probable at one time a smithy, stables and toll house near Roughwood Farm. Roughwood was a small fortified tower in the 15th century and was home sequentially to the Hammills, Sheddens, and Ralston-Patricks.

== Micro-history ==
In 1912 several farms were held by the Spier's Trust and were subject to an official inspection by representatives of the trust. The Cuff, Marshyland, Bellcraig, Bogstone and Lugtonridge were all owned by the trust at this time.

Eglinton Street was formerly known as the Whang or Whang Street and the plot of land at No 62 was feued in 1826 from Lady Mary Montgomerie by Robert Spier. The small chapel in the grounds to the rear was apparently for the family's private use and is probably the same age as the house.

The rubble from the demolished school was taken to Lyonshields Farm and used to infill an old limestone quarry.

In 1935 a cannon was located at the front of the school as seen in a photograph taken at that time.

The annual Cadger's races of the 19th century were held at the Marshalland Field.

The name 'Pow' or 'Poll' refers to a slow-moving ditch-like stream and this may be appropriate in regard of the name of the burn, the Powgree.

On 11 May 1912 an official inspection by the governors took place of the farms owned by the Spier's Trust, these being Cuff, Marshyland, Bellcraig, Bogston, and Lugtonridge.

A Spier's Knowe is marked on Windy Hill above Largs on the Muirshiel Hills.

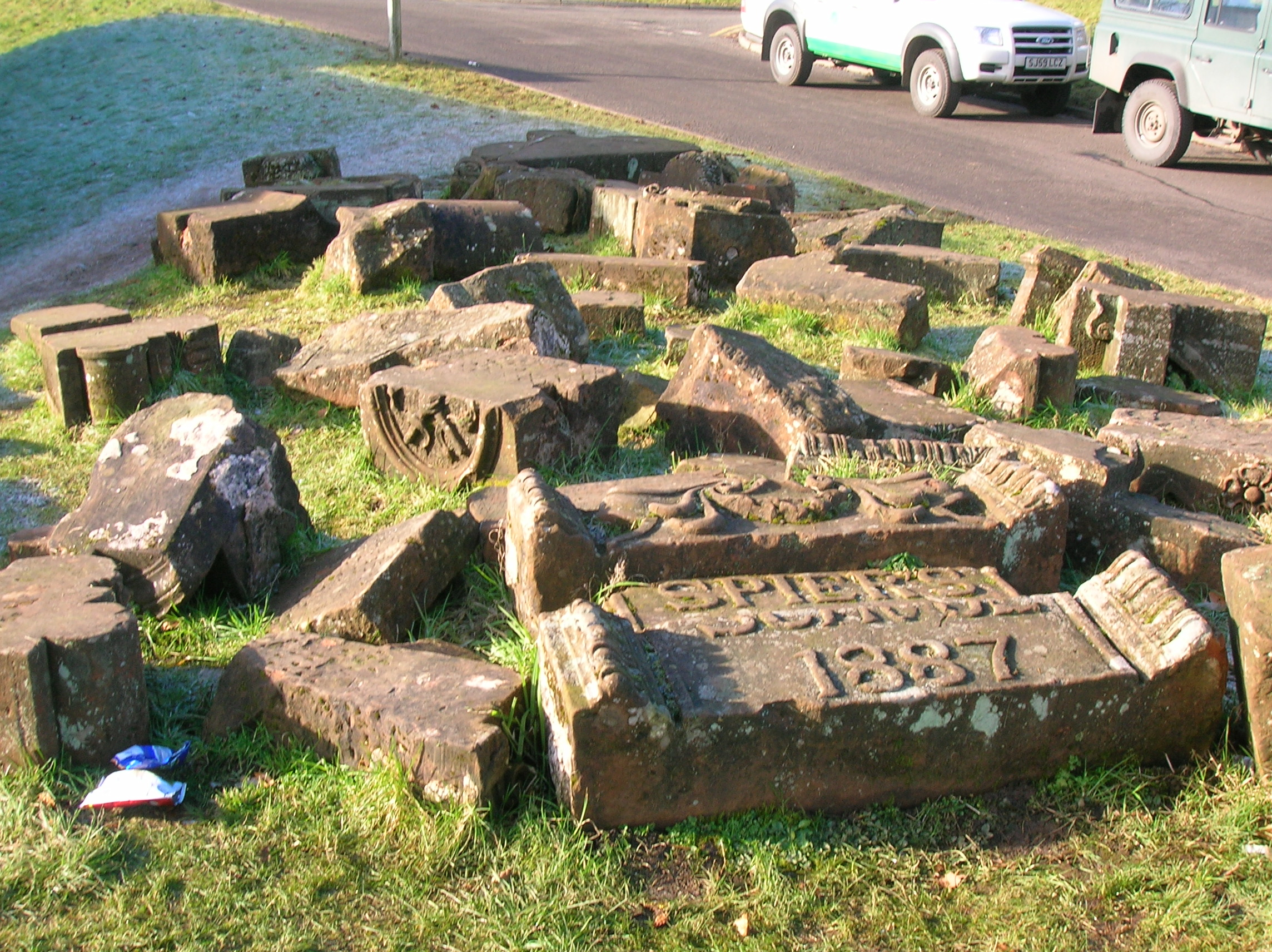
Spier's ornamental stones at Garnock Academy

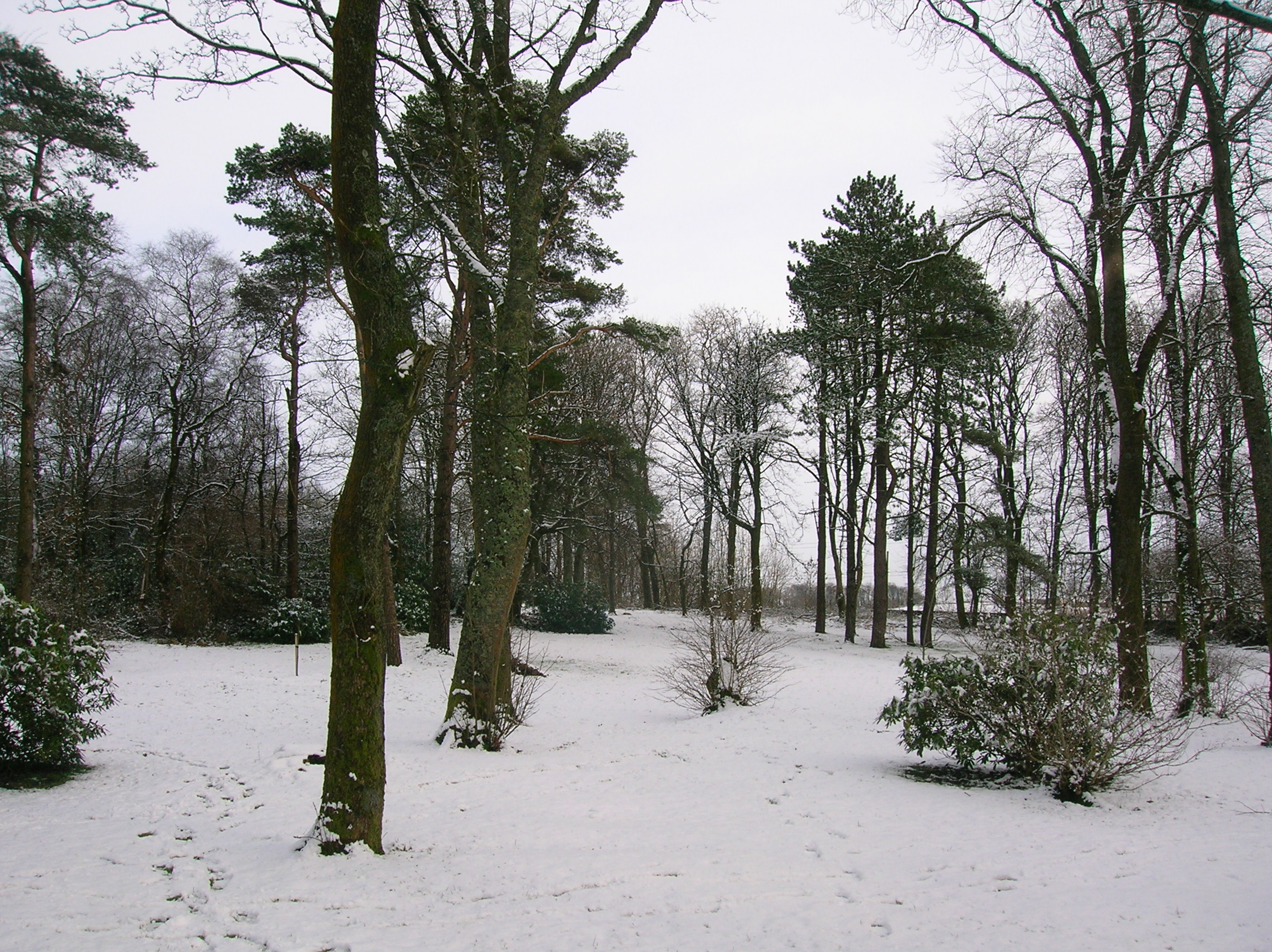
Scot's pines at Spier's in the snows of 2009

The 1st Beith Company (Spier's) Girl Guides was in the 1930s the only Guides group in Beith and was based at Spier's. The Girl Guides had a centre in the field next to the school for some years; the Spier's Trust having sold them 2.2 acres (8,900 m^{2}). This building was repeatedly vandalised. The site was sold and a dwelling built, but after two fires this was also demolished. Only a small building remains, also vandalised.

The 'Old Spierian' records that transport to the school was a regular and severe problem. The 'train students' in particular had to leave home very early and return late.

The 1910 OS map shows a 'Sheepwash' nearly opposite the side entrance to Marshalland farm. A house on the Barrmill Road where it joins the Beith bypass has the unusual name of 'Bellscauseway'. During the depression in the 1930s, times were hard and local people would go up to Spier's School to gather wood for the fire, but as often as not they got 'hunted' by the janitor. A mineral spring known as 'Spiers Well' existed near Gatehead in 1789.

The ghost of John Spier was said to roam the school tower, possibly to discourage students from exploring it, and that of his mother, Margaret Spier, the school grounds. The ornate memorial to John Spier was partitioned off due to its depressing effect on the students.

The Pirritt Hills in Antarctica are named for John Pirritt, Old Spierian, explorer and geologist.

The Powgree Burn name may translate as 'water or marsh (Pow) in an enclose area (Gree)' which is a good description of the area below the Hill of Beith where the Powgree has its source.

Donald Reid records that the school grounds were enclosed and laid out by Mr W. F. Love of Beith.

== Restoration of Spier's parklands ==
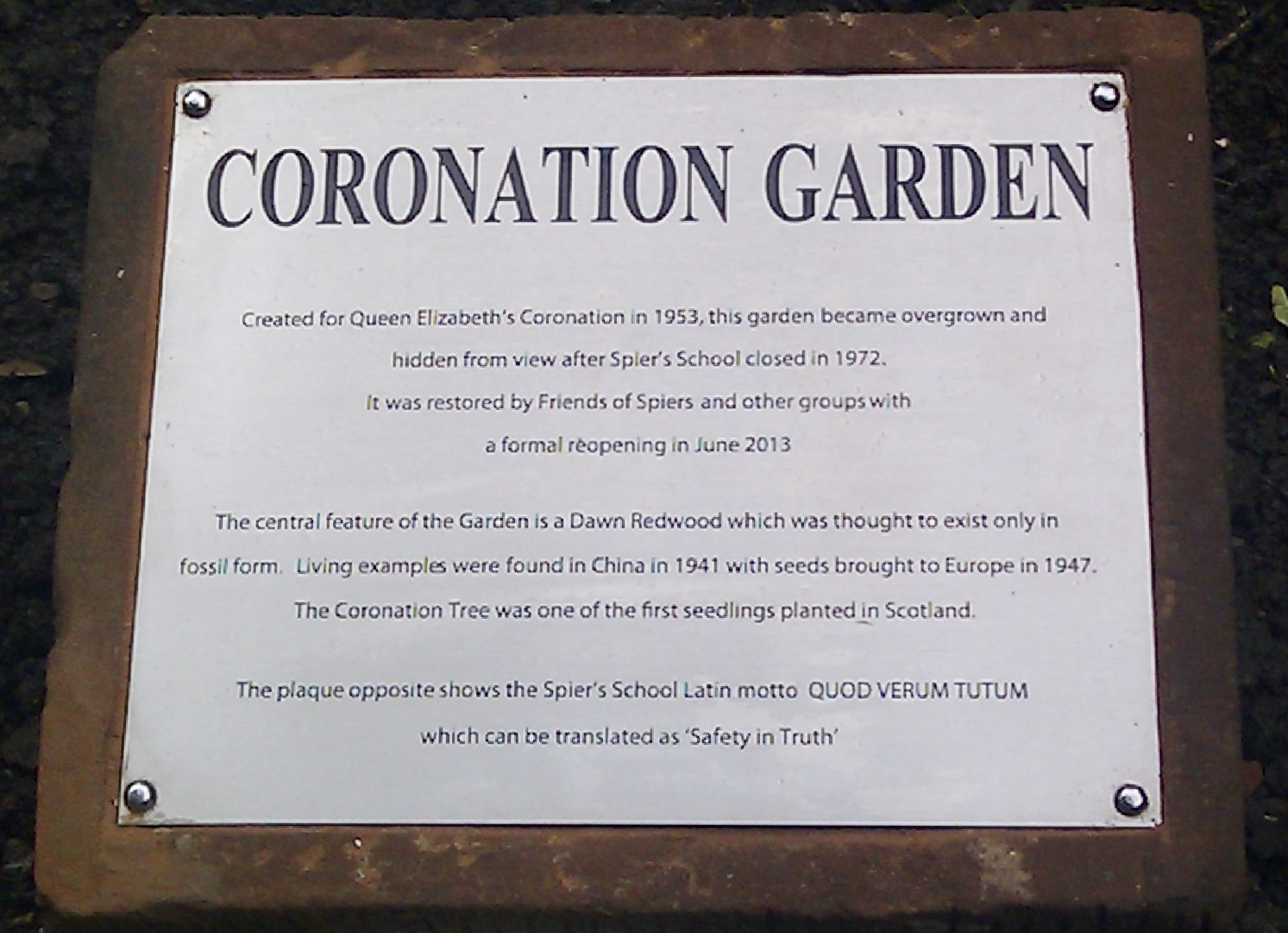
Plaque at the Coronation Garden.

The North Ayrshire Council Ranger Service co-ordinated the restoration and enhancement of the Spier's parklands with contributions from Beith and Gateside Primary schools; The Conservation Volunteers; Youth Making Beith Better; James Watt College; Redburn Activity Group; YKG Group; NAC Extended Outreach Group; Garnock Academy; Friends of Spiers; NAC Ranger Service volunteers; Geocachers; Youth Services; Beith Community Council; Geilsland School; Employability Fund Group; Beith Community Council; etc.

=== Community involvement at Spier's ===
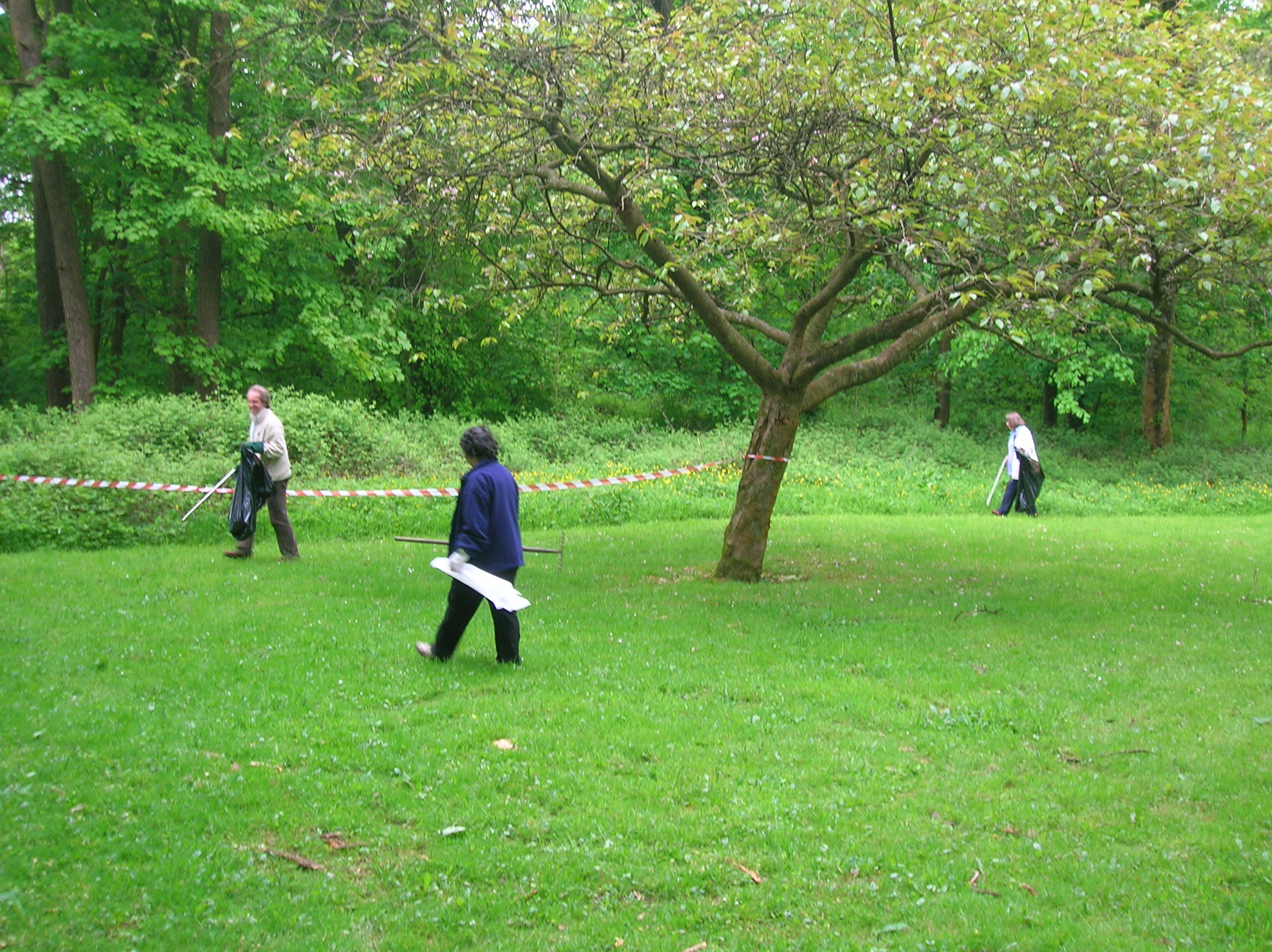
The YMBB volunteers at work in the grounds

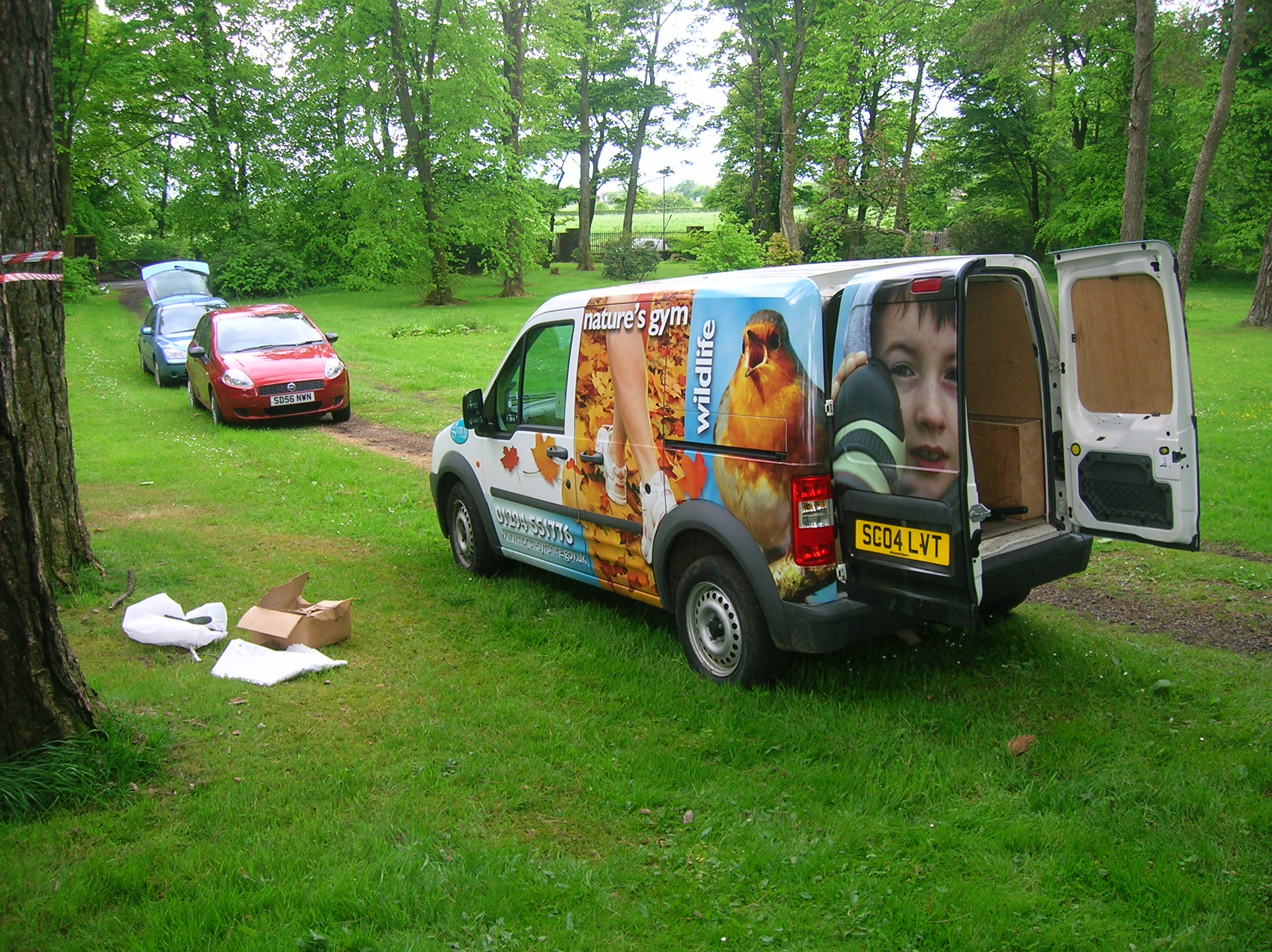
The North Ayrshire Council Ranger Service lent a hand

In 2008 Beith Community Council organised a Spier's School grounds tidy up and improvements morning. Litter was removed and an old path was cleared to allow better access to the site for local people and visitors to the area. Gateside Primary school have planted trees and bulbs donated by the community and Eglinton Country Park. Ardrossan Academy pupils have opened up new paths through the woods and the grounds.

The 'Youth Making Beith Better' group carried out path maintenance and many other grounds improvements works at Spier's through their John Muir Award work. Ken Stewart of Dalry brought Wesley, his Clydesdale horse, to extract logs from the woodlands, providing a spectacle for visitors and removing fallen timber with minimal damage to the habitats. Beith Out of School Care produced publicity posters for the site and the YKG youth group had a BBQ and planted trees. Geilsland School was involved in several projects within the parklands, especially the Coronation Garden restoration.

A Sustainable Return on Investment (SRoI) project was trialed at Spier's, organised by the Greenspace group and part financed by Scottish Natural Heritage.

=== Friends of Spier's (FoS) ===
This is a Garnock Valley support group, affiliated to The Conservation Volunteers (TCV).

== The Cuff ==
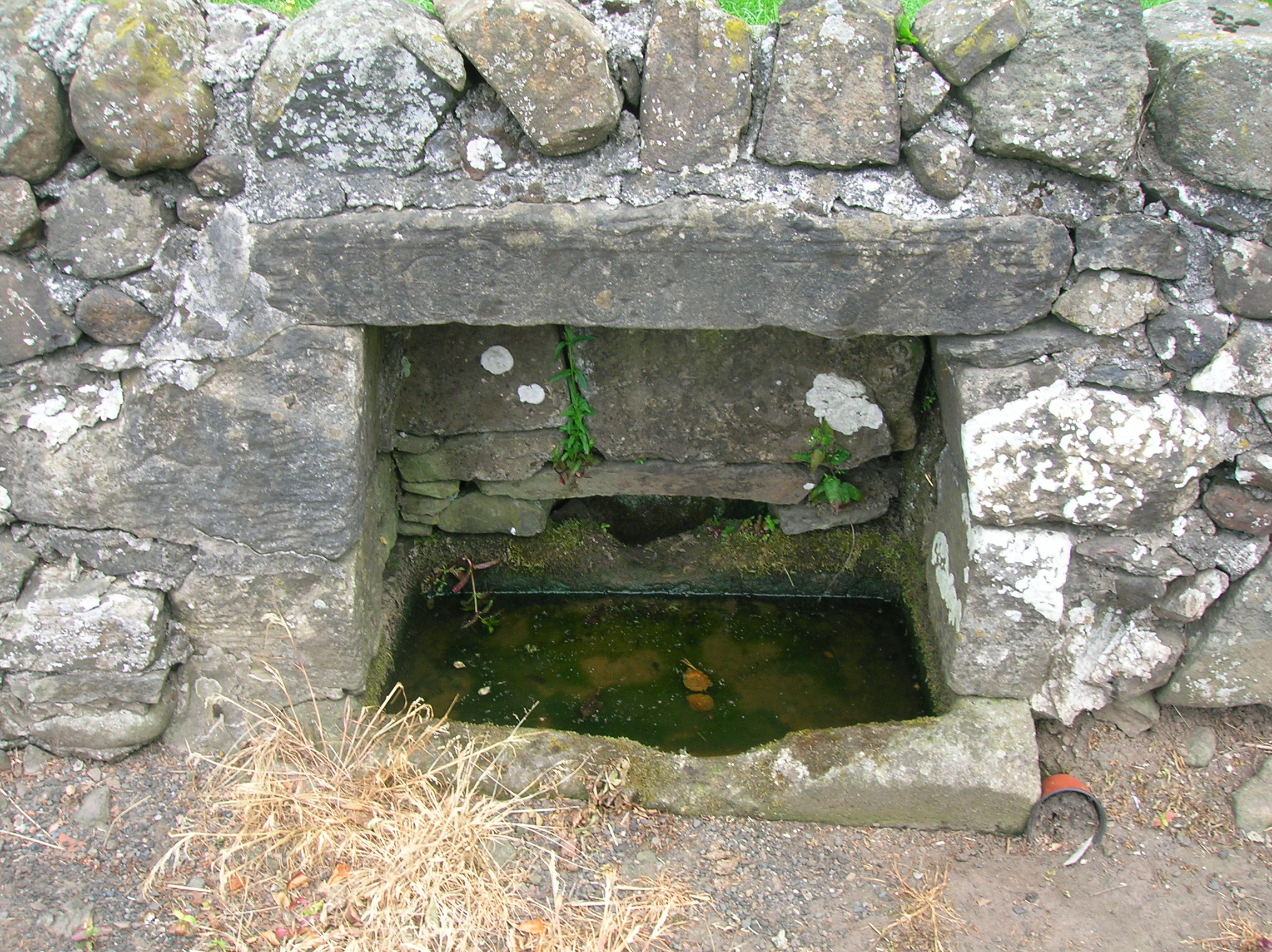
Gibson marriage stone at the Cuff, Gateside

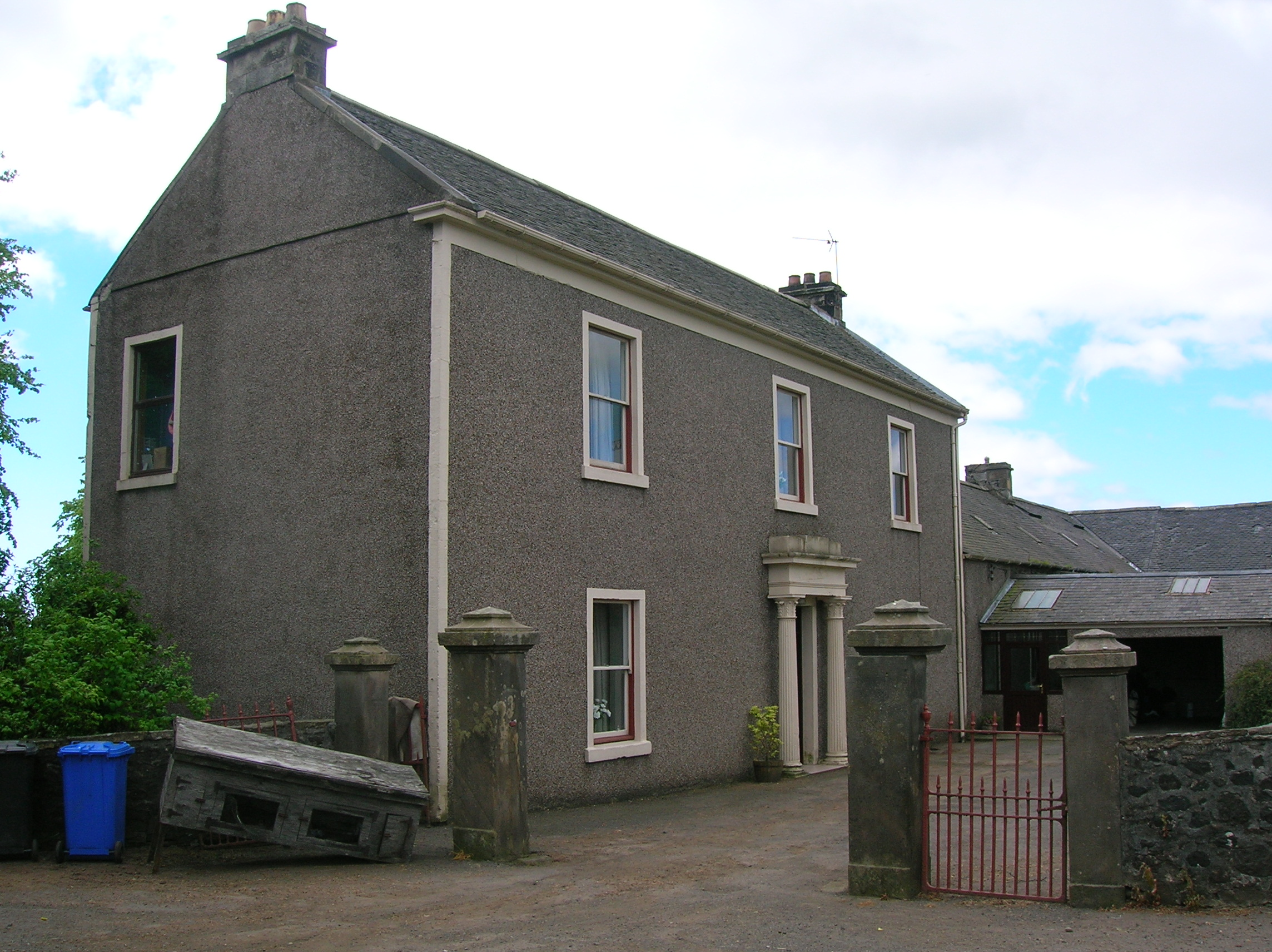
The Cuff farmhouse and entrance gateposts

The Cuff was an estate which later became a farm, near Gateside. A marriage stone of the Gibson family gives the date 1767 and may have come from an older mansion house once situated nearby. The farm still has ornamental and functional entrance gates and gateposts from the Victorian era and magnificent lanes lined with beech trees. Margaret Gibson was an heiress, and her son John Spier was living at the Cuff at the time of his early death. The Spiers owned the Cuff estate and through Robert Spier's marriage to Margaret Gibson acquired the estate of Marshalland.
