= Hill of Beith Castle =

Castle in North Ayrshire, Scotland

- Beith, North Ayrshire, Scotland; GB grid reference NS255564, 620506
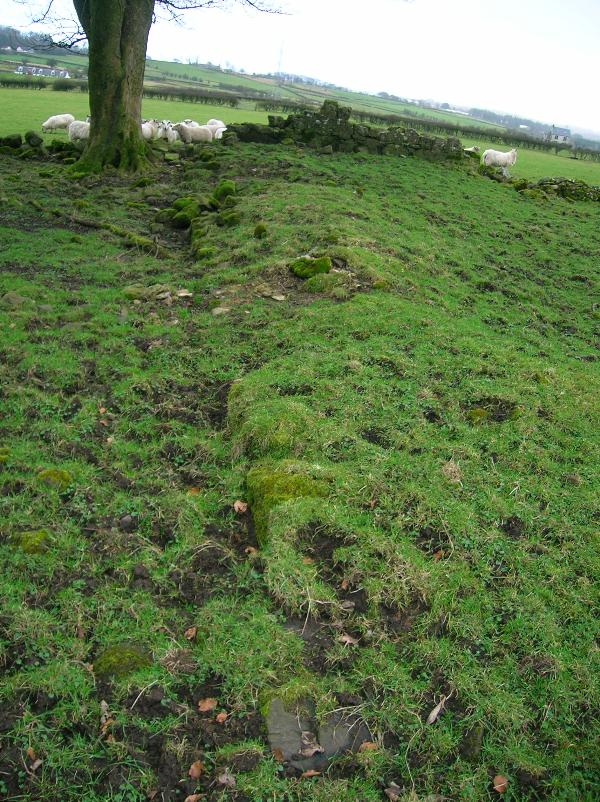
- Substantial foundations of the castle tower

Site information
- Type: Tower Castle
- Owner: Private
- Open to the public: No
- Condition: Foundations only

Location
- Shown within Scotland
- Location within Scotland
- Coordinates: 55.752332°N 4.614919°W

Site history
- Built: 16th Century
- Built by: Cuninghame
- Materials: Stone

The old Barony and castle, fortalice, or tower house of Hill of Beith lay in the feudal Regality of Kilwinning, within the Baillerie of Cunninghame, and the Sherrifdom of Ayr, now the Parish of Beith, North Ayrshire, Scotland.

== History ==
=== The abbots of Kilwinning Abbey ===
Kilwinning Abbey ruins in the 19th century

The Tironensian monks of Kilwinning Abbey held a Grange or farmland at Beith, given to the abbey by Sir William de Cunninghame in the early 14th century. This ownership involved the monks in extensive agricultural activities and details of the rents from their farms show a considerable annual production of cheese in particular, 268 recorded for one year alone.

The Barony of Beith had been given to the Kilwinning monks by Richard de Morville's wife towards the end of the 12th century and the monks as ecclesiastical barons, with the feudal right of 'pit and gallows', had a court hill where they delivered local justice. This artificial earth mound is still in existence, standing close to Boghall House. The abbey's farm or Grange was most likely at Grangehill, a small estate nearby.

The abbot may have stayed at the Hill of Beith castle when in the locality as this tower may have been the main residential building of the monks' grange, becoming secularised upon the dissolution of the monastery and passing into the hands of the aristocracy. The site is prominent, commanding a fine view of the surrounding countryside and being well defended by the natural slopes, overlooking the old Loch Brand site that protected its north-westerly boundary.

=== The lairds of the Barony of Beith ===
The abbot of Kilwinning feued out the 'Lands of Hill of Beith' to a cadet branch of the Cuninghames of Kilmaurs, Earls of Glencairn, in the person of John Cuninghame, son of Sir William Cuninghame of Caddel, near Giffordland outside Dalry.

At the Reformation, James Hamilton, son of Gavin Hamilton the last abbot of Kilwinning, obtained the twenty-four shilling land of old extent with the teinds of the same of Overhill (Easter) Hill of Beith and then in around 1579 he sold them to Lord Robert Boyd. The Cunninghames however once again held the castle and lands in the early 1600s at the time of Timothy Pont's famous survey of Cunninghame.

Records show that the title 'Beith', 'Hill of Beith' or 'Gudeman of Beith' was applied to John Cuninghame, who was also the ruling elder for the parish of Beith in 1647 and 1649. John was the defender in the process of setting the stipend of the Rev. James Fullarton. Minister of Beith. In 1662 John Cuninghame was heavily fined, the amount being £626 13s 4d, for his support of the religious zealots Colonel Strachan and Colonel Ker who as members of the Covenanter Army had in 1650 caused considerable damage to the lands of the Earl of Queensberry.

The fact that John Cuninghame was recorded as the 'Gudeman of Beith' suggests that he held his lands from the 'true' laird, possibly Lord Boyd as previously mentioned. A feudal laird held land from the King, however a proprietor who held lands from the laird by purchase or otherwise was referred to as the Gudeman of that Ilk; also a man of equal rank or the head of a household.

The Cuninghames had sold the castle and lands of Hill of Beith by the end of the 17th century and in around 1798 Hugh Brown of Broadstone purchased Easter Hill of Beith and his son, also Hugh, purchased the farm and lands of Nether Hill of Beith circa 1808.

=== Easter and Nether Hill of Beith ===
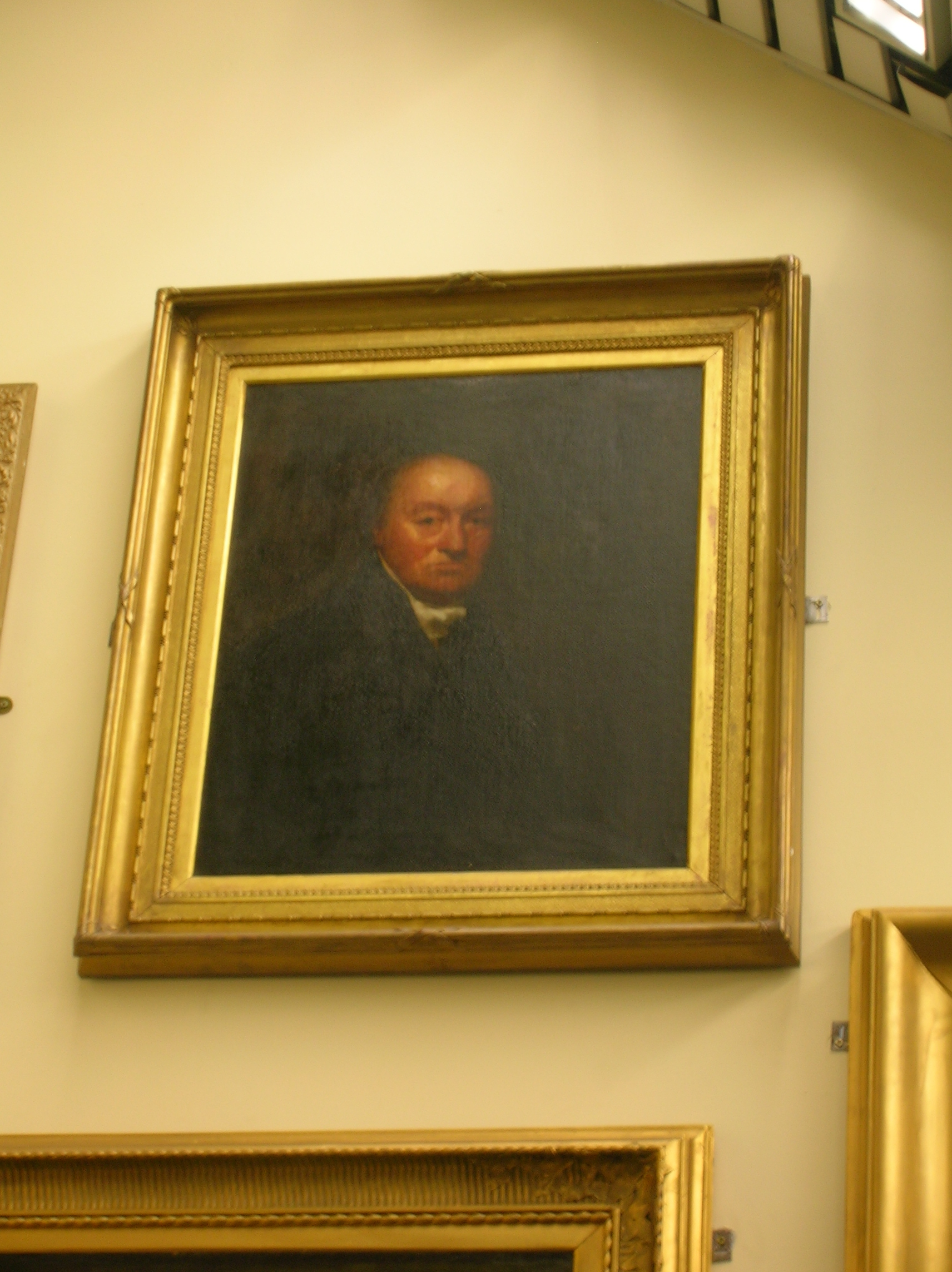
Hugh Brown of Broadstone and Hill of Beith Castle

Etymology
The name Hill of Beith derives from the old barony Court Hill. All baronies had a Court, Moot or Justice hill upon which the Barony Court met to settle local legal cases as presided over by the laird or his nominated baillie.

These two dwellings and their associated lands made up the Barony of Hill of Beith and are recorded in the 1600s as being held by the monastery of Kilwinning. The monks also held Loch Brand or Boghall Loch. The shortened version, 'Hill o'Beith' was often used.

'Nether' suggests a building lying below another property, in this case one lying to the west, and marked on Armstrong's 1775 map as 'Mains', the name that was used for a farm attached to a proprietor's dwelling. The Mains farm is shown with a ruined building standing close by. Easter Hill of Beith is also recorded as Overhill of Beith and even West Hill of Beith. Nether was the farm and Easter Hill of Beith was the fortified dwelling of the laird and his family as indicated by the relative size of the buildings and presence of a walled enclosure.

In 1832 only a single farm named 'Hill of Beith' is marked, with the original curving entrance lane that survives as a hedge boundary following the later creation of a new direct entrance from Wardrop Street.

The names Easter and Nether Hill of Beith have ceased to be used; the term Netherhill is now used by the modern buildings at the site of the old toll house.

=== Hill of Beith Castle ===
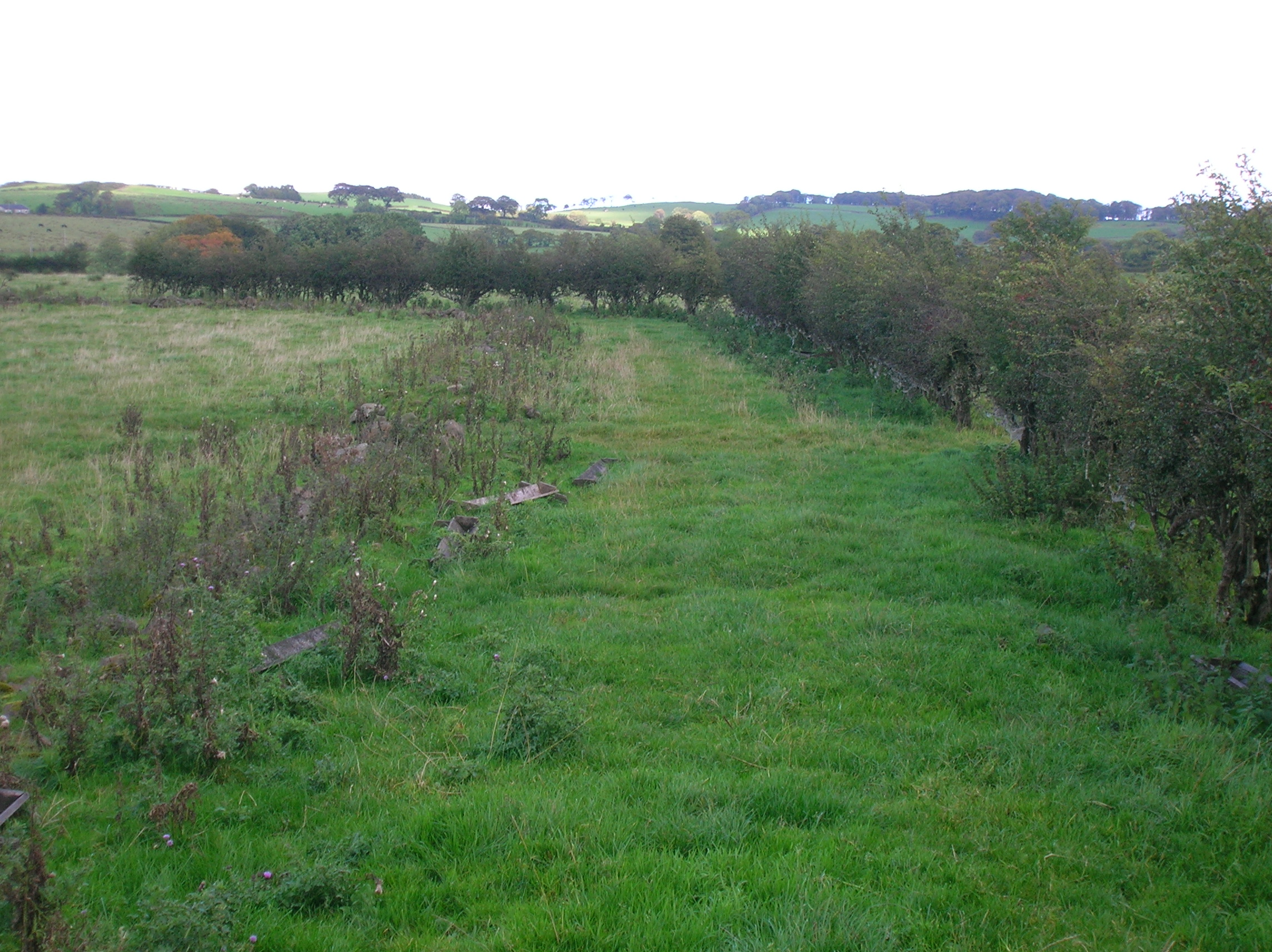
The old entrance lane to the castle

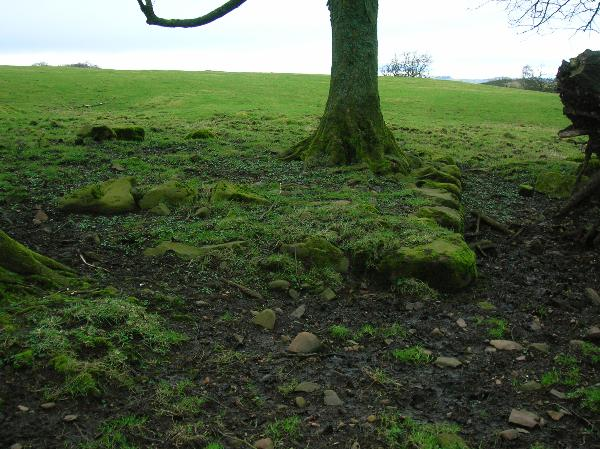
Castle site with foundations

McJannet records that De Morville had a moated hillock at Beith. This may have later been used as the Court Hill.

Easter Hill of Beith was probably a castellated building such as a fortalice or tower house, close to Nether or Hill of Beith Mains, half a mile south-west of the Grange, the monks farm where the abbot of Kilwinning may have stayed when in the locality if not at the castle site itself, overlooking their loch and their court hill.

In the early 1600s the fortified dwelling is referred to as Easter-Hill of Byith a pretty building, veill planted belonging to Johne Cuninghame. Blaeu's map of 1654, originating in the 1600s, shows a castellated tower named 'Hill of Beith.'

General Roy's Military Survey of Scotland (1747–55) map shows two groups of buildings at 'Hill of Bieth' (sic), the easterly group being enclosed within a boundary wall and having one substantial L-shaped building as well as two smaller outbuildings. Neither the Grange nor Nether Hill of Beith have such a large building marked.

Armstrong's map of 1775 shows a building marked as 'Mains' with a fairly substantial ruined castle close by. It is not marked as a ruin, however the identical image as for the ruined Giffin Castle is used. Nearby estates have a 'mansion house' symbol used. Dobie states that the castle's stones had been mainly removed by the middle of the 18th century. The 1832 map no longer marks the castle site or its formal access.

Remains of substantial wall foundations of squared masonry 1.4m thick and 0.4m high, mainly overgown with grass turfs, are visible in the copse around 200m north-west of the Court Hill and above Boghall House. A section 5.0m long and 0.6m thick of the field boundary wall consists of mortared masonry as opposed to drystone dyke. Nearby ruined drystone dykes may be composed of stones robbed from the castle, its boundary wall and outbuildings. Some of these stones are clearly worked or dressed building remnants.

The 1845 Statistical Account states that the square castle stood close to the Court Hill and was removed in the middle of the 18th century. Porterfield in 1925 states that 'Johnnie Cunningham's' home, the tower castle, stood at Easter Hill of Beith in the field at top of the old grassy lane that runs up from Netherhill Toll.

The quote from Love's work is - "Their farm is clearly indicated by the name "Grangehill" (NS 356 546) and "The Maynes". Blaeu's map indicates a castellated mansion or tower house on part of the Maynes, half a mile SW of the Grange, where the abbot may have stayed when in the locality."

The castle may have been converted and the buildings used as a farm dwelling before its final demise as a dwelling in the 18th century.

== The Court Hill ==
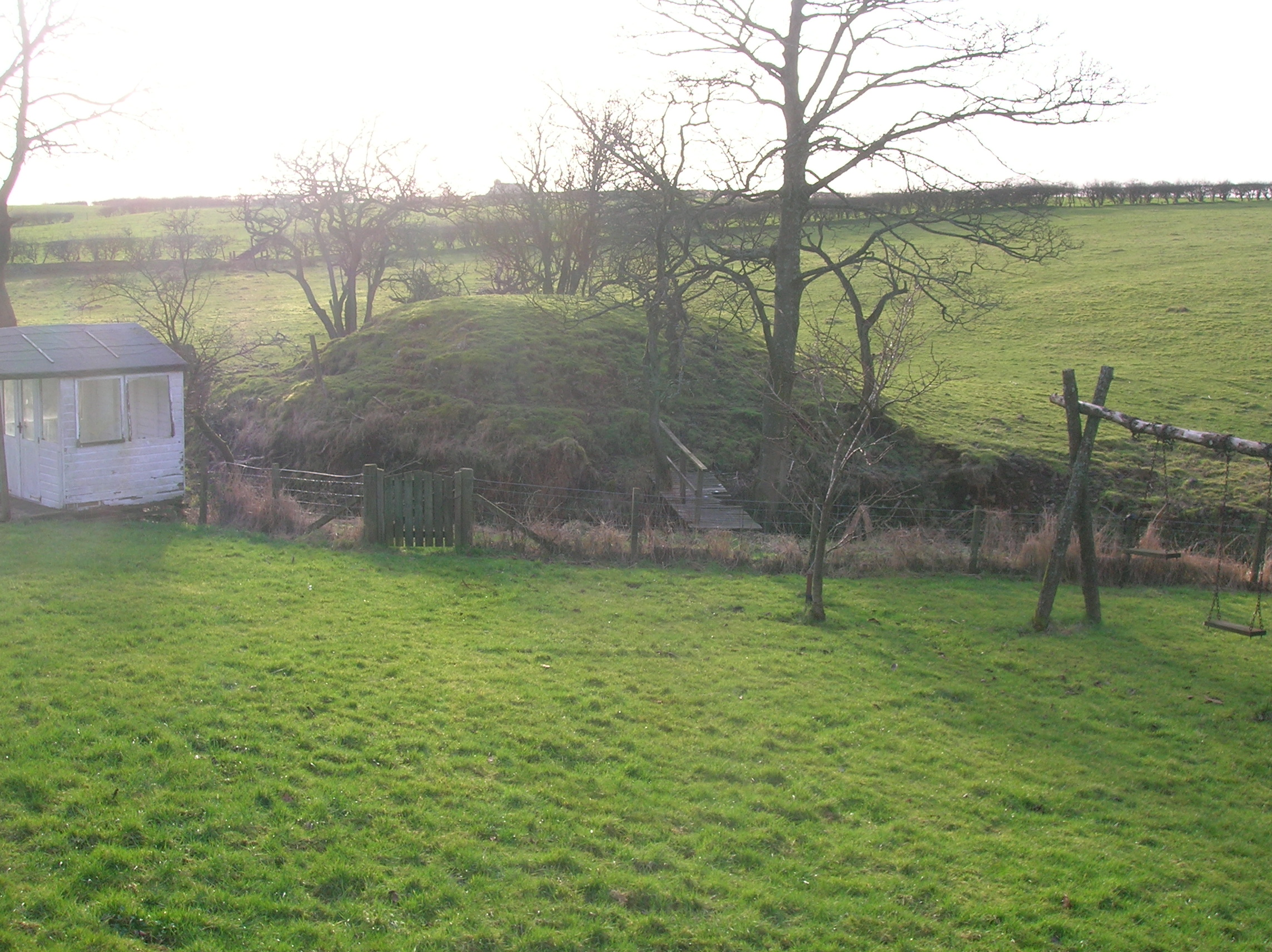
The Court Hill of Beith

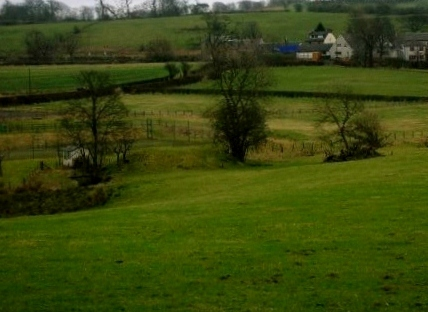
The Court Hill of Beith from the site of Hill of Beith Castle

The placename 'Hill of Beith' itself refers not to the hill, but instead to that rare survival of feudal power, the 'Court Hill' or Moot hill, that sits close to Boghall House, beside the burn that runs down from the site of the old Loch Brand to eventually reach its confluence with the Powgree Burn. The hill is composed of soil and boulders and measures 17 paces in diameter at the bottom, and 6 feet 8 inches high. The flat top, which is flat is not totally circular, and is 8 paces in diameter.

As feudal lords, the abbots of Kilwinning Abbey and their secular successors held and presided over courts of law on this hill, it being the 'Caput of the Barony of Beith', the site where the legal entity of the barony was physically located. The dissolution of the monasteries ended the abbots involvement in the mid 16th century. Such court hills were sometimes built from soil deliberately brought to the site from all the different parts of the lands of the barony.

The small copse next to the castle site is known as the 'Hangman's Wood' locally, suggesting that this was the site of the barony gallows.

== Loch Brand or Boghall Loch ==
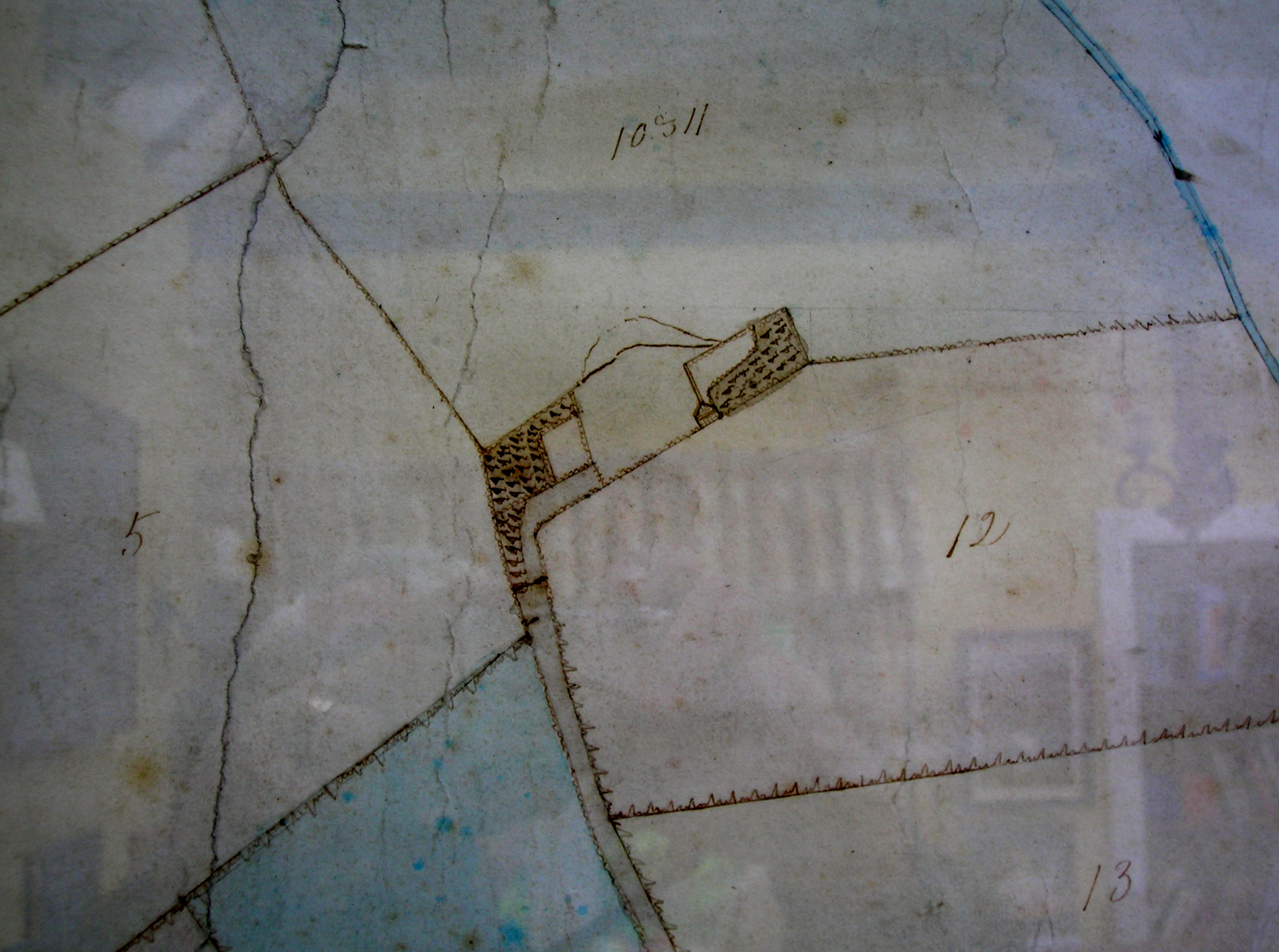
The site of the old castle in 1850. 'Lane to Old Houses' is marked on this map.

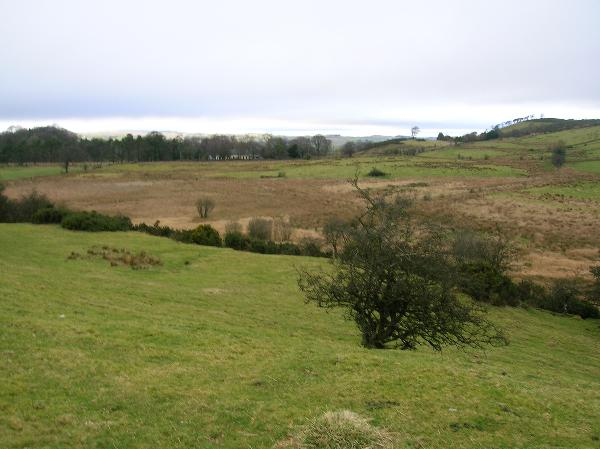
The site of Loch Brand from Hill of Beith Castle site

The small Loch Brand was once held by the monastery of Kilwinning Abbey and it is recorded that in 1482 the monks had to take legal action against the Montgomeries of Giffin Castle and a James Ker, who were accused of dangerous destruction and down-casting of the fosses and dikes of the loch called Loch Brand. Although shown on a map of 1654 it no longer appears on Roy's map of circa 1747. Despite this cartographic evidence it is said to have been finally drained in 1780 at which time oak and elm stakes were uncovered which may have been evidence of a crannog once existing here. The new lands were used for agriculture and are discernible today (2010) as poorly drained wetlands.

=== Boghall ===
Bog Hall was acquired by Hew Montgomerie of Braidstone (sic) in 1691, succeeded by his son Mathew who died childless. Mathew Pollock of Boghouse acquired the lands in 1734 and was succeeded by his son Mathew in 1771. In turn Matthews son, also Mathew, succeeded in 1790 and in 1826 by his son, another Mathew. Margaret Shedden purchased Bog Hall in 1833 and, after the death of her husband John Shedden Dobie, the property was sold to Charles Greenshields Reid of Grangehill House, a neighbouring property. In 1858 Boghall was sold to William Ross JP, who probably built the present house. In the 20th century the Knox family of Beith were owners.

This old habitation, marked as Boighall on a 1654 map, sits next to the site of the old loch, and was the home to the mother, Janet Pollock, of Robert Tannahill the 'Weaver Poet'.

== The Mill of Beith ==
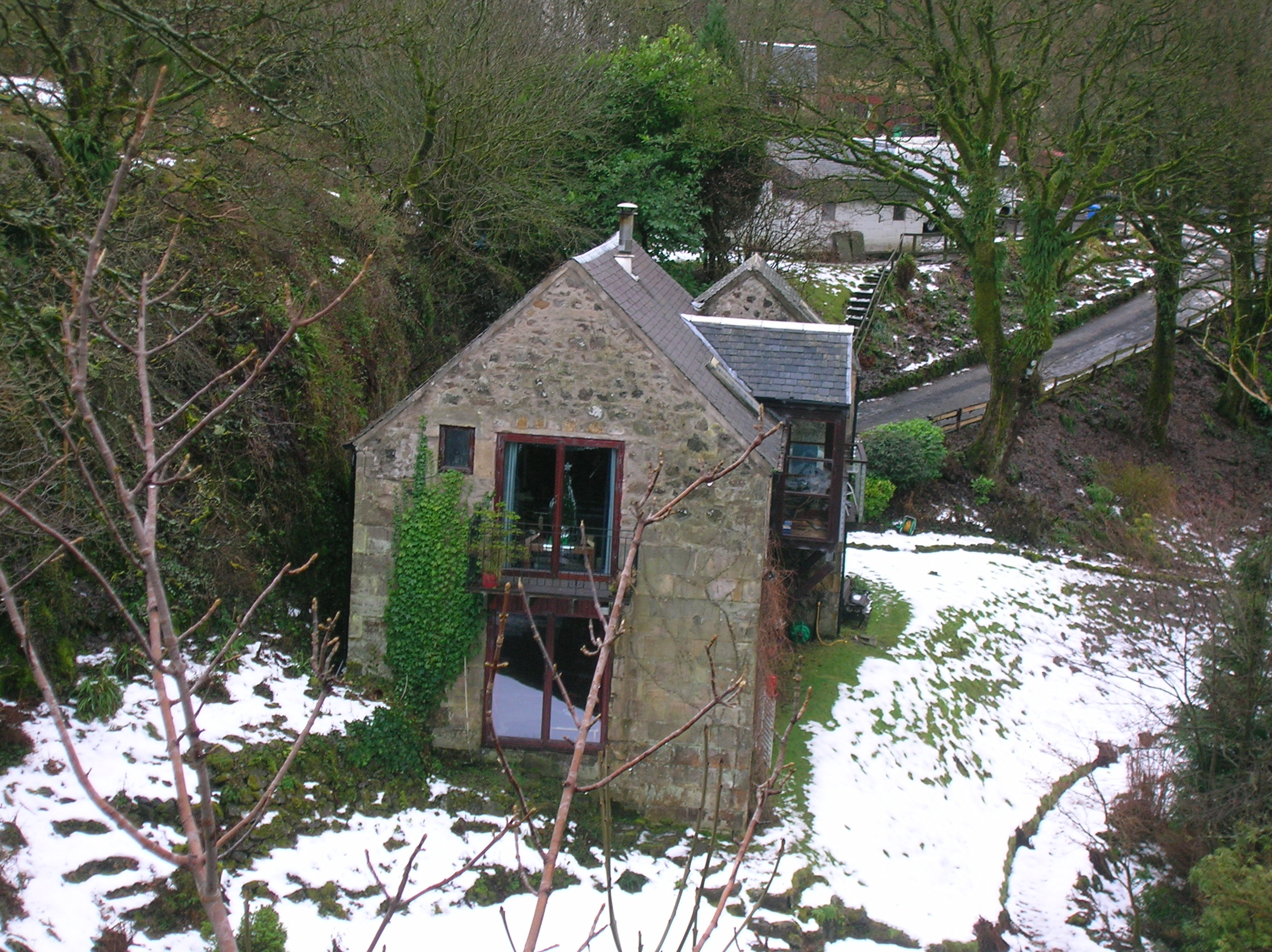
The Mill of Beith

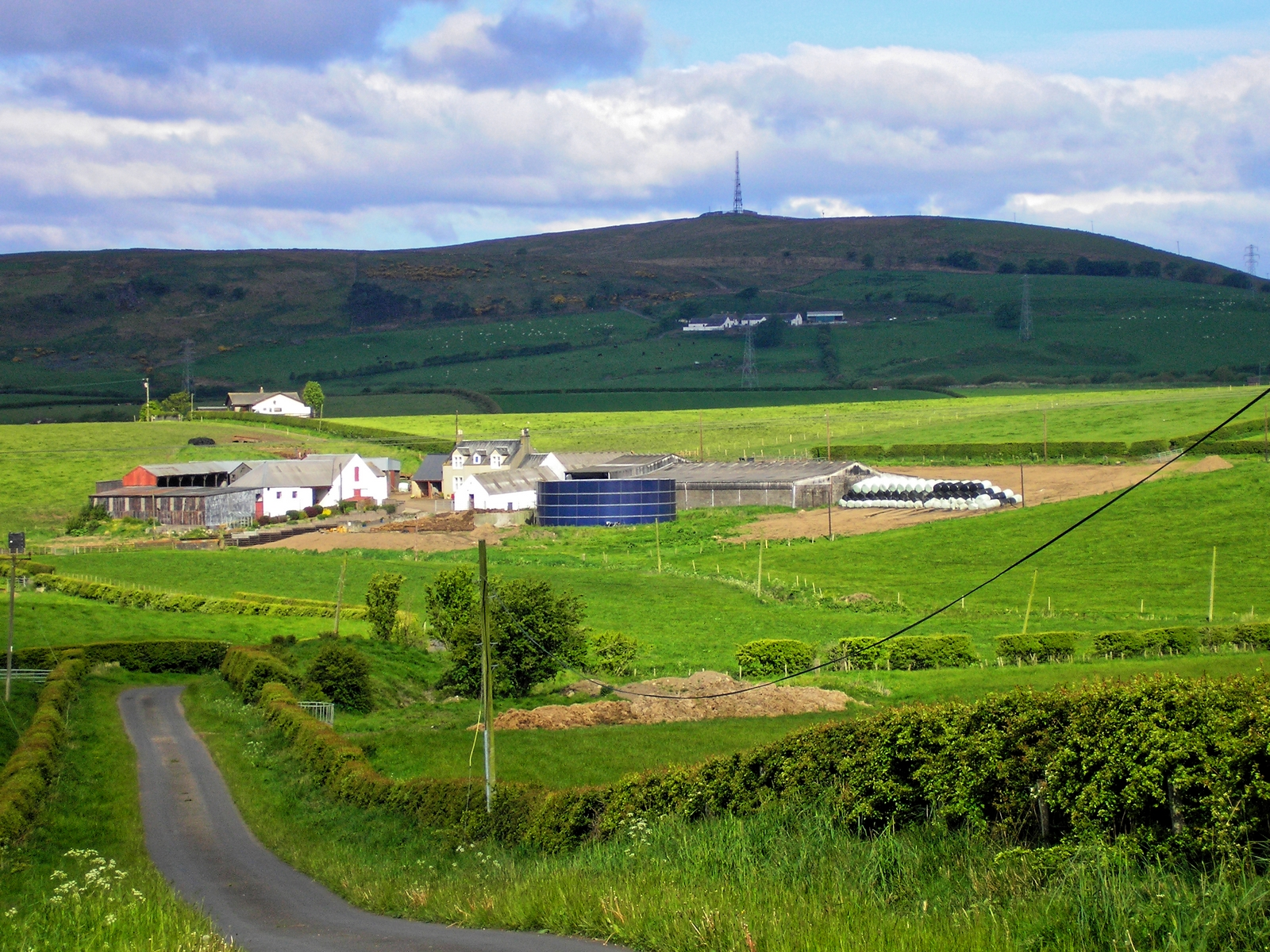
Caddell Farm.

The water-mill of the Barony of Hill of Beith stood on the Muir or Roebank Burn at Mill of Beith (NS 366 559) where there is a linn or waterfall, called the 'Warlock Linn' or 'Warlock Craigie'. The present day Mill of Beith dates from the late 18th to early 19th century, being a small rectangular rubble built building with an offset square kiln. The lower part of the wheel splash wall is faced with ashlar. The wheel was mid breast, about 3 ft (0.91m) wide by 16 ft (4.88m) diameter, and was fed from a dam on the burn which ran through a lade under the road running to the mill. The ruins of the Davies o'the Mill, once home to Dugald Semple, stand nearby down the old lane that has now been blocked off.

A glacial erratic stands in the Roebank Burn, used in the past as a diving platform by local youths.

== Micro-history ==
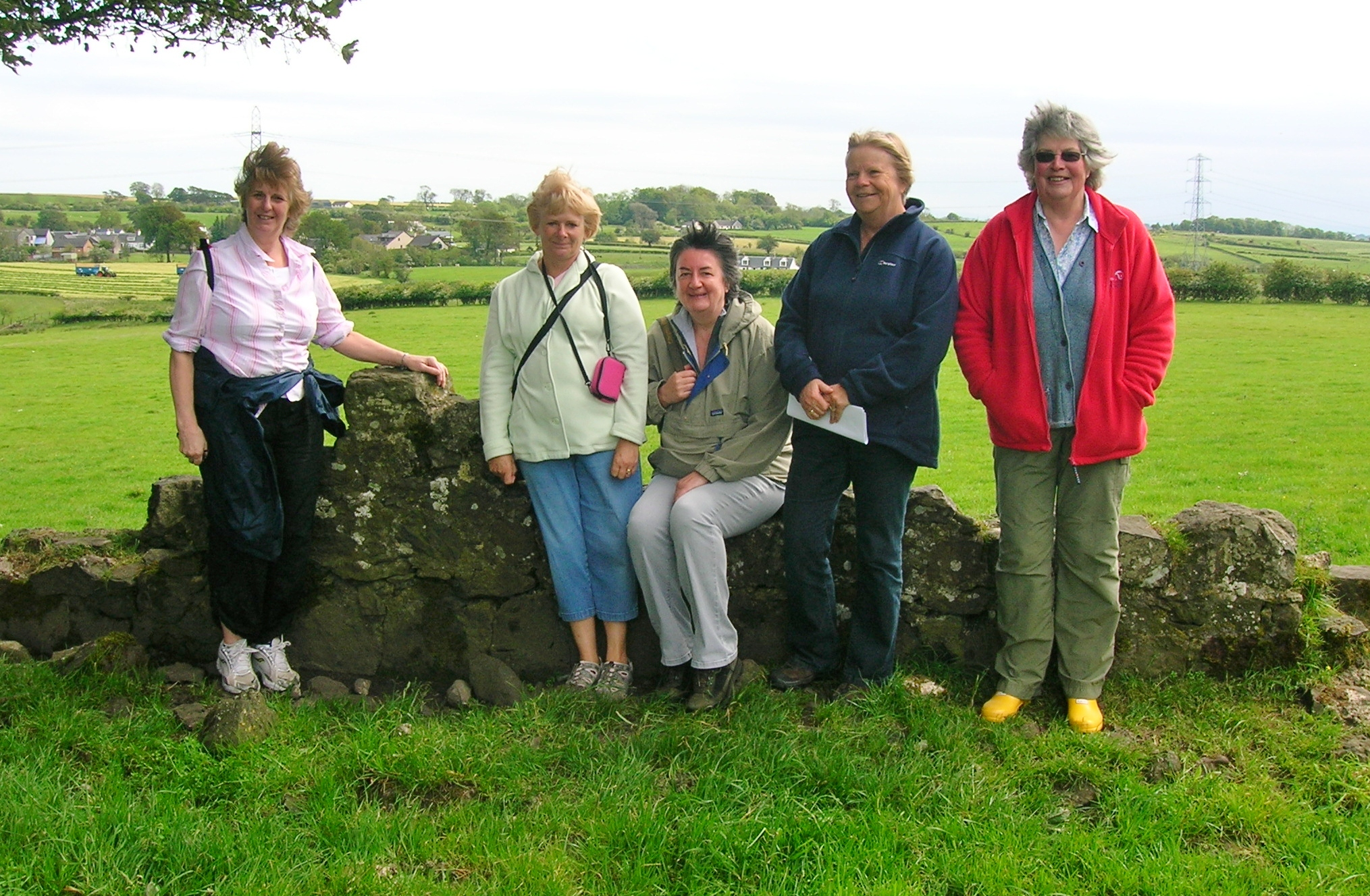
Beith Ladies Walking Group at the castle site

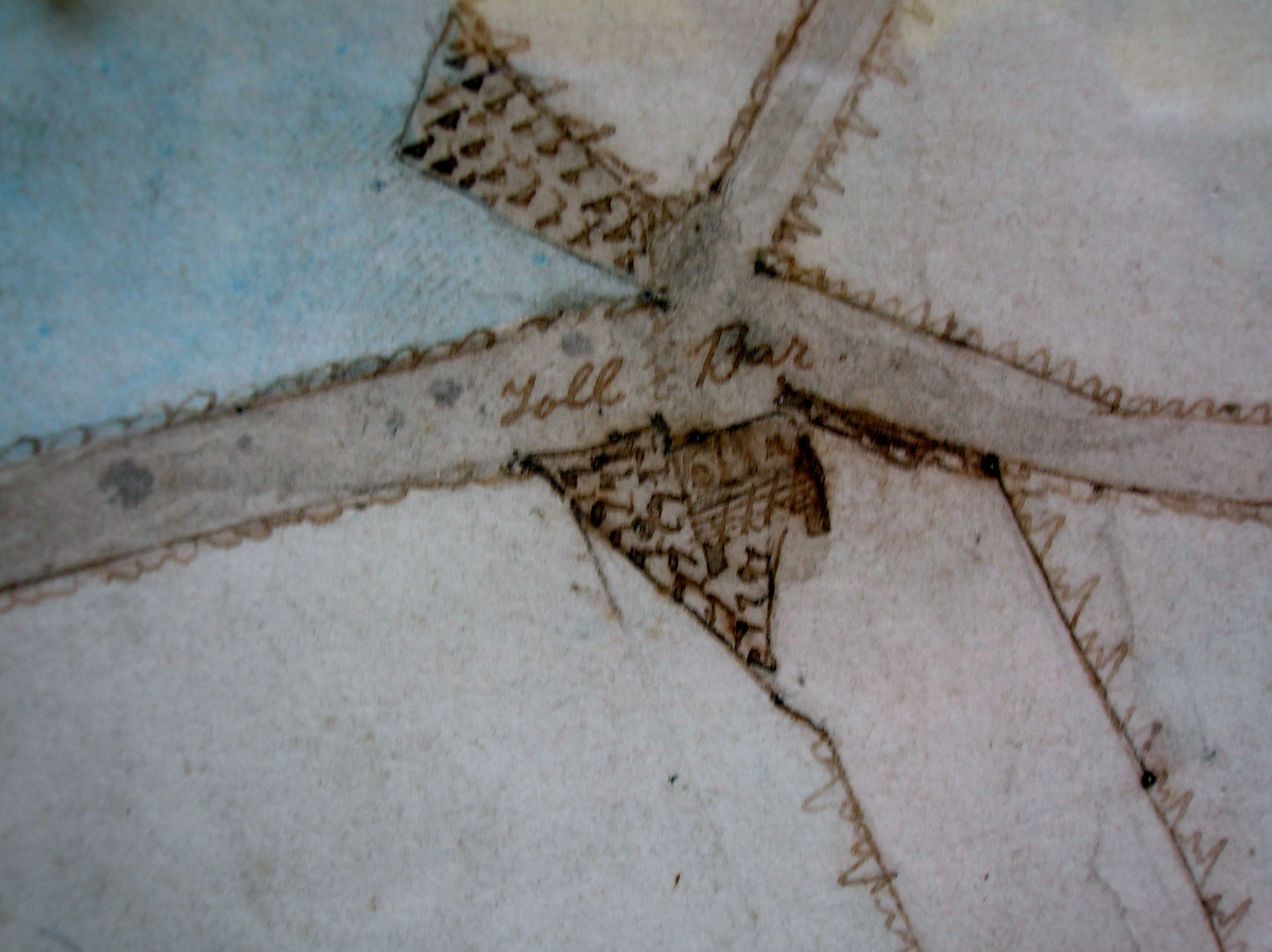
Netherhill Toll in 1850.

The town of Beith itself was once officially known as 'Hill of Beith' and only later became known by its shortened name.

The Hill of Beith Castle site was situated near the old turnpike from Kilwinning via Beith to Coldstream Bridge. It was built under the 1767 Ayr Roads Act.

The 'Wood of Beit', now the 'Moor of Beith', has been identified with an Arthurian site where according to Taliessin in a poem under the name of 'Canowan' it was the site of a battle in the wood of Beit at the close of the day.

== See also ==
- Gateside, North Ayrshire
