= Gateside, North Ayrshire =

Coordinates: 55.74°N 4.61°W

Gateside
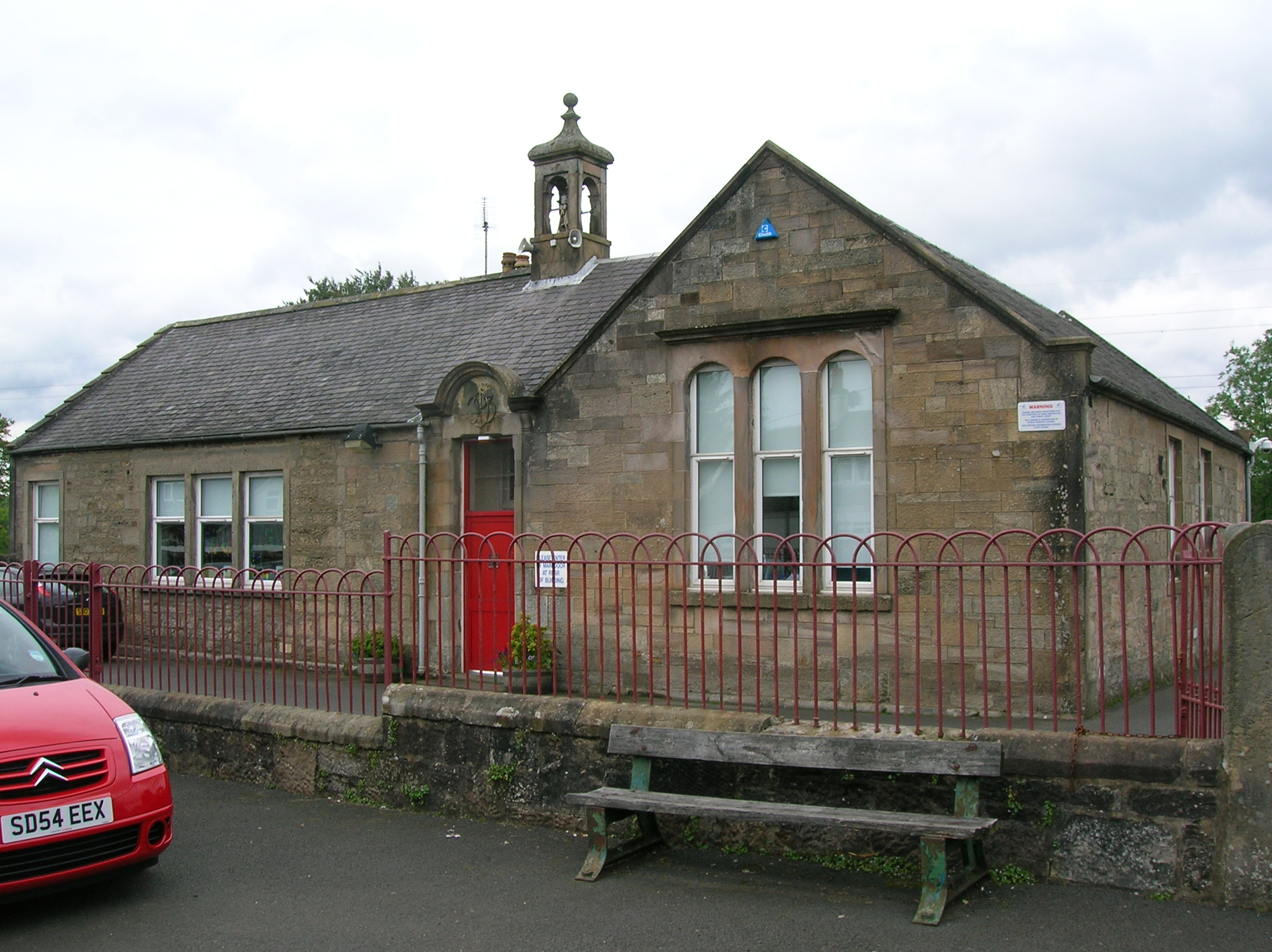
- Gateside Primary School

- Location within North Ayrshire
- Council area: North Ayrshire
- Lieutenancy area: Ayrshire and Arran
- Country: Scotland
- Sovereign state: United Kingdom
- Dialling code: 01505
- Police: Scotland
- Fire: Scottish
- Ambulance: Scottish
- UK Parliament: Central Ayrshire
- Scottish Parliament: Cunninghame South

Gateside is a small village in North Ayrshire, Scotland about 1/2 mile (800 metres) east of Beith on the B777.

== The village ==
Gateside Primary School was opened in 1903, and nowadays it has 74 pupils (2009). The school has an extension built in 1998 which provided indoor toilets and a school hall, which is used by the nursery, PE classes, and for school dinners and assemblies. Another extension is to be built soon. The school is very environmentally aware and has achieved its Green Flag Award (2009). Spier's school stood nearby and the grounds are now a public park used by the Gateside and Beith communities.

The Isabel Patrick Memorial Hall is a building in the Gothic style. Trearne House stood near Gateside, but it was demolished and the site is now a large worked out limestone quarry.

A field behind the primary school was given to the community by the Marshall family who were the village blacksmiths for many years.

The meaning of Powgree, Gateside's burn, is suggested as being 'Stream of the herd (of deer)'.

== Views of Gateside ==
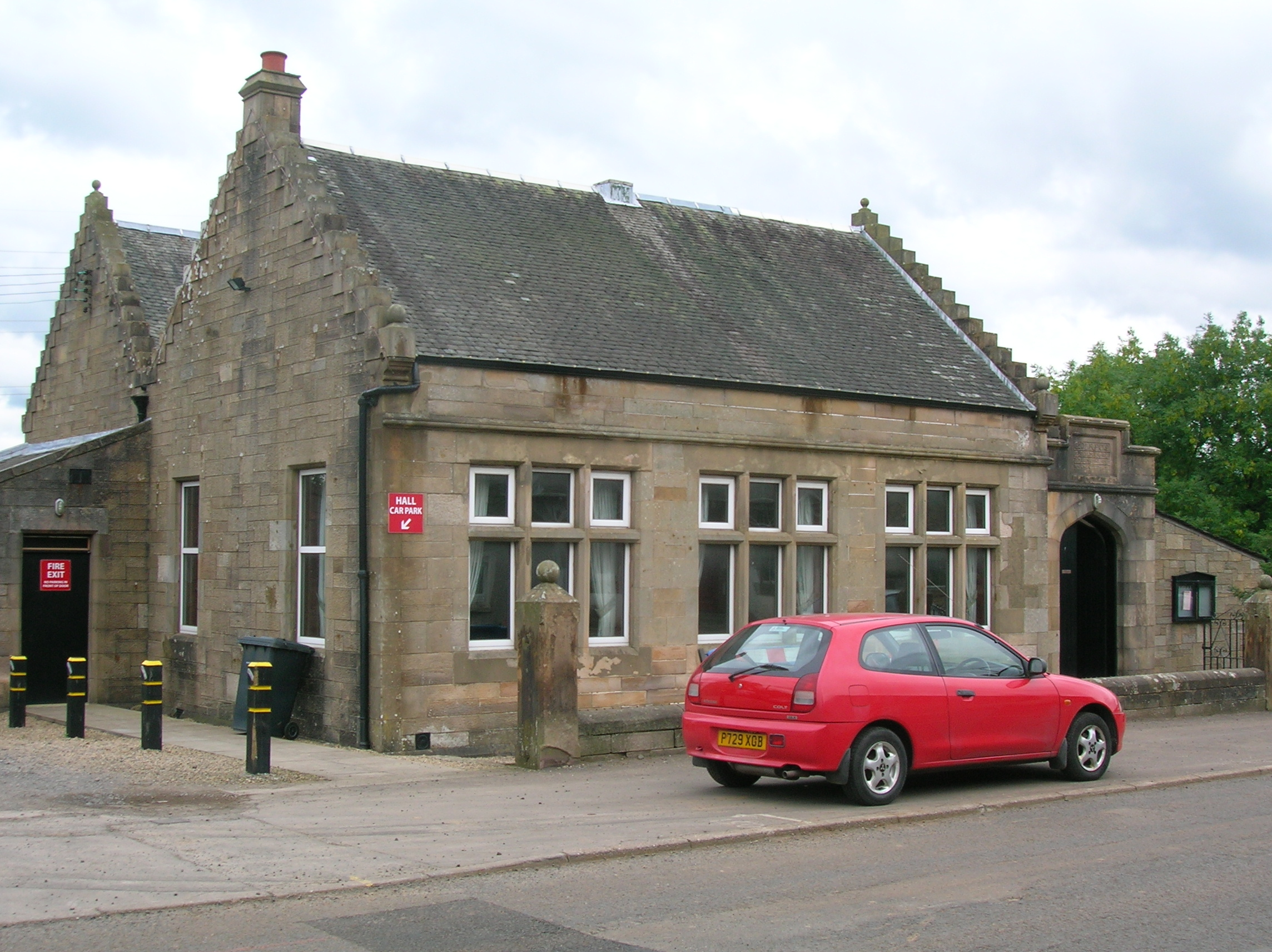
Gateside Memorial Hall.

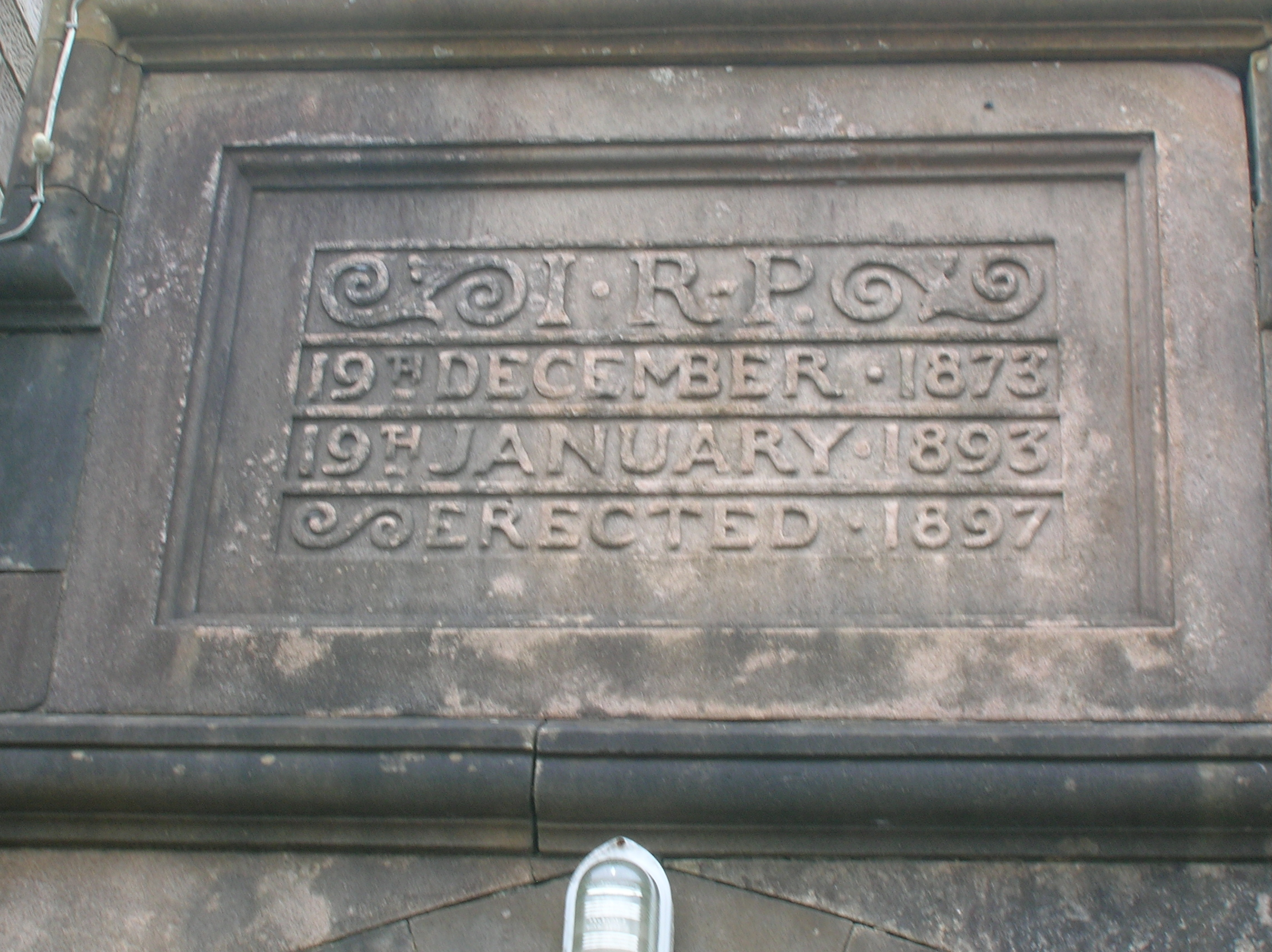
Memorial to Isabel Ralston Patrick of Trearne who died aged 19 years.

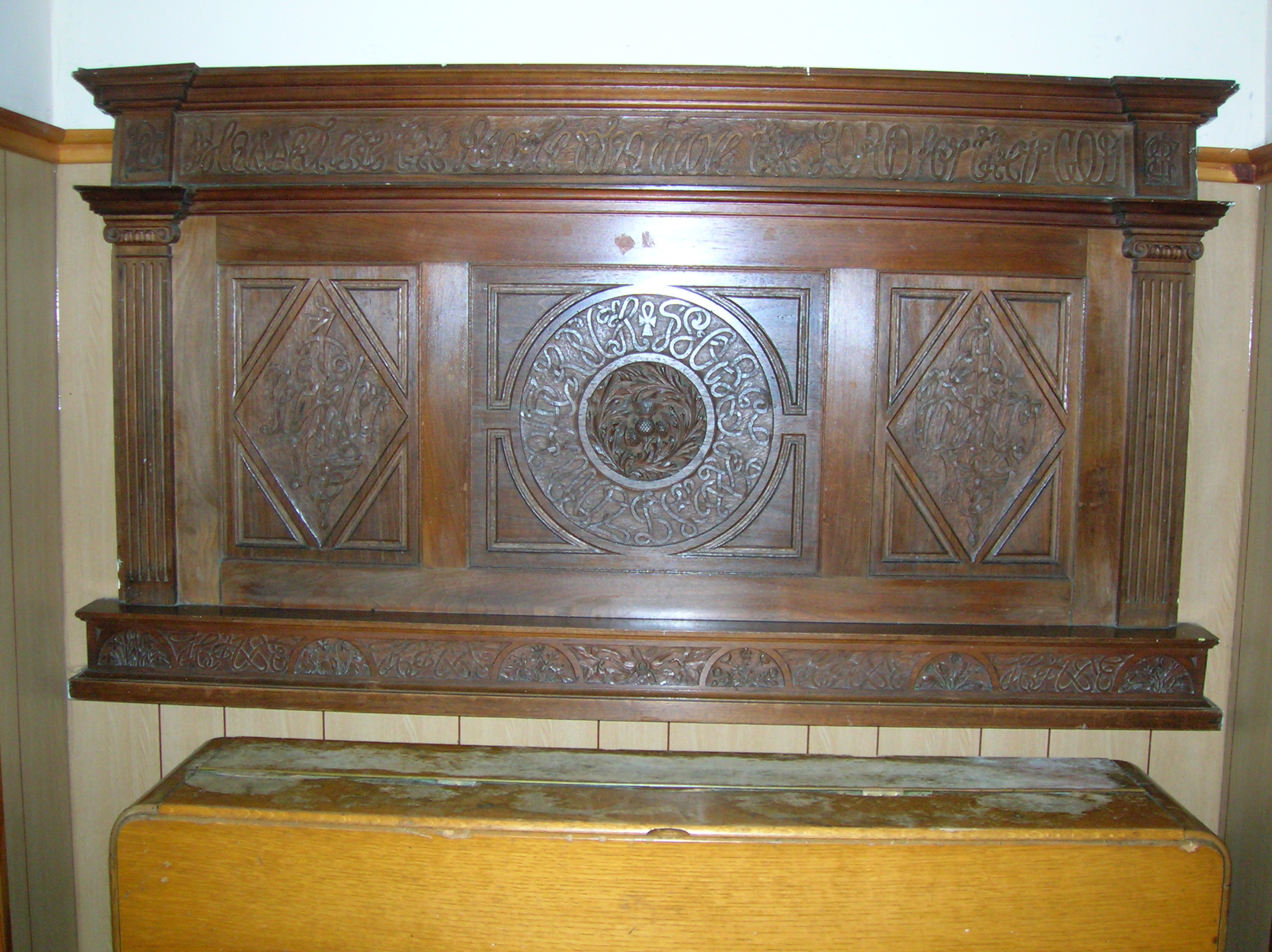
A highly carved mantelpiece in Gateside Memorial Hall.

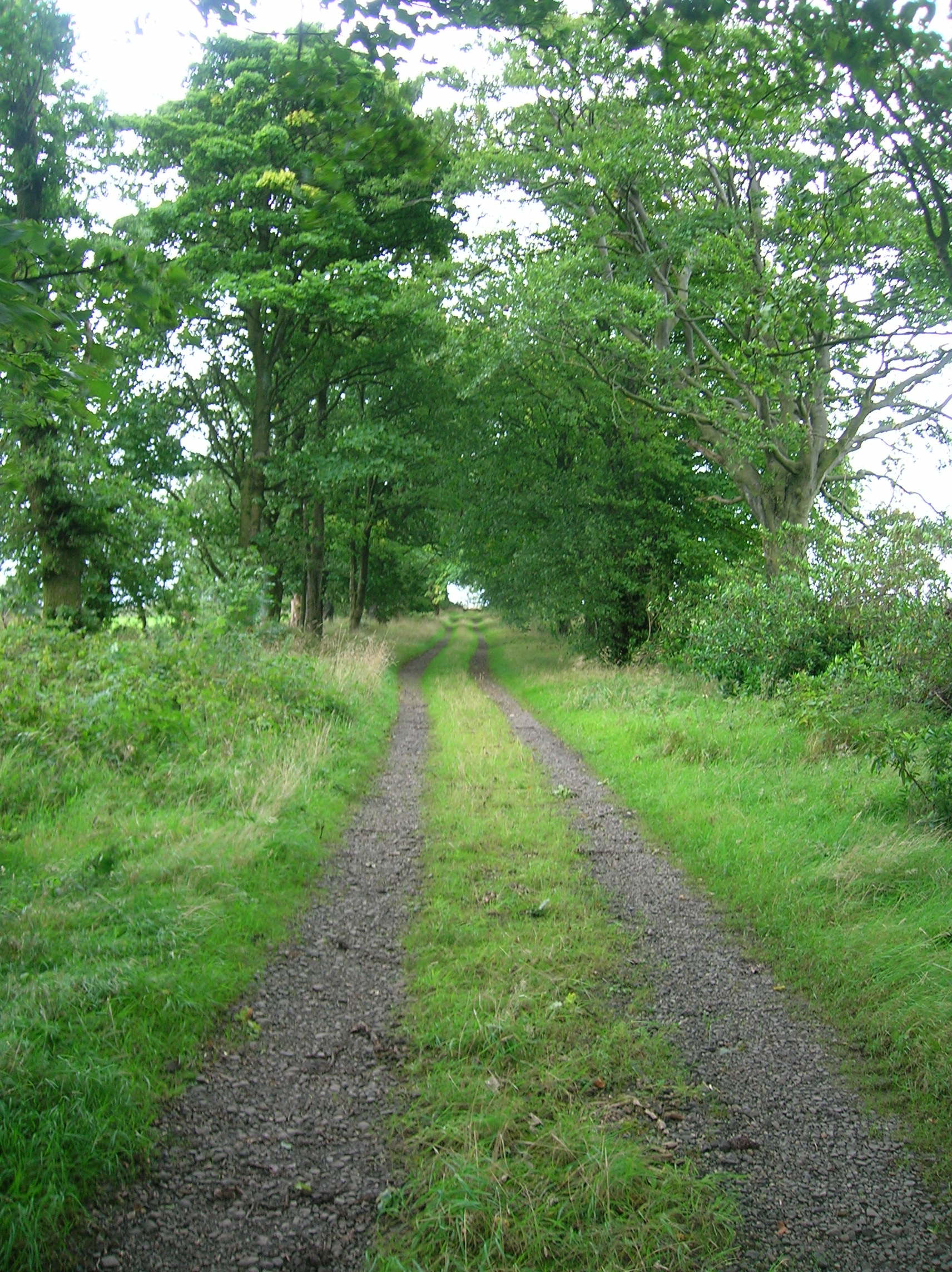
The old driveway that led to Trearne House.

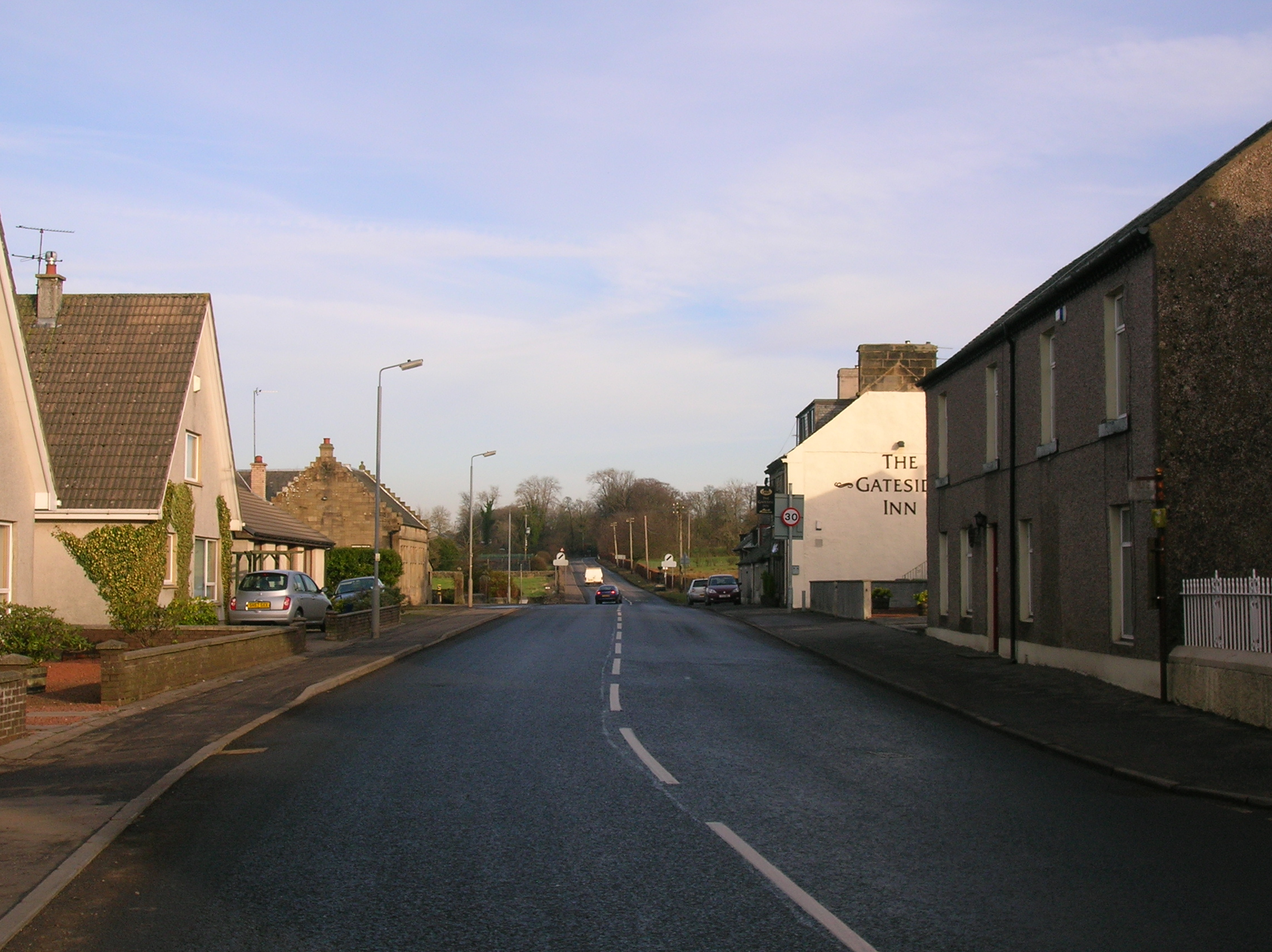
The village inn and mainstreet.

== The Court Hill ==
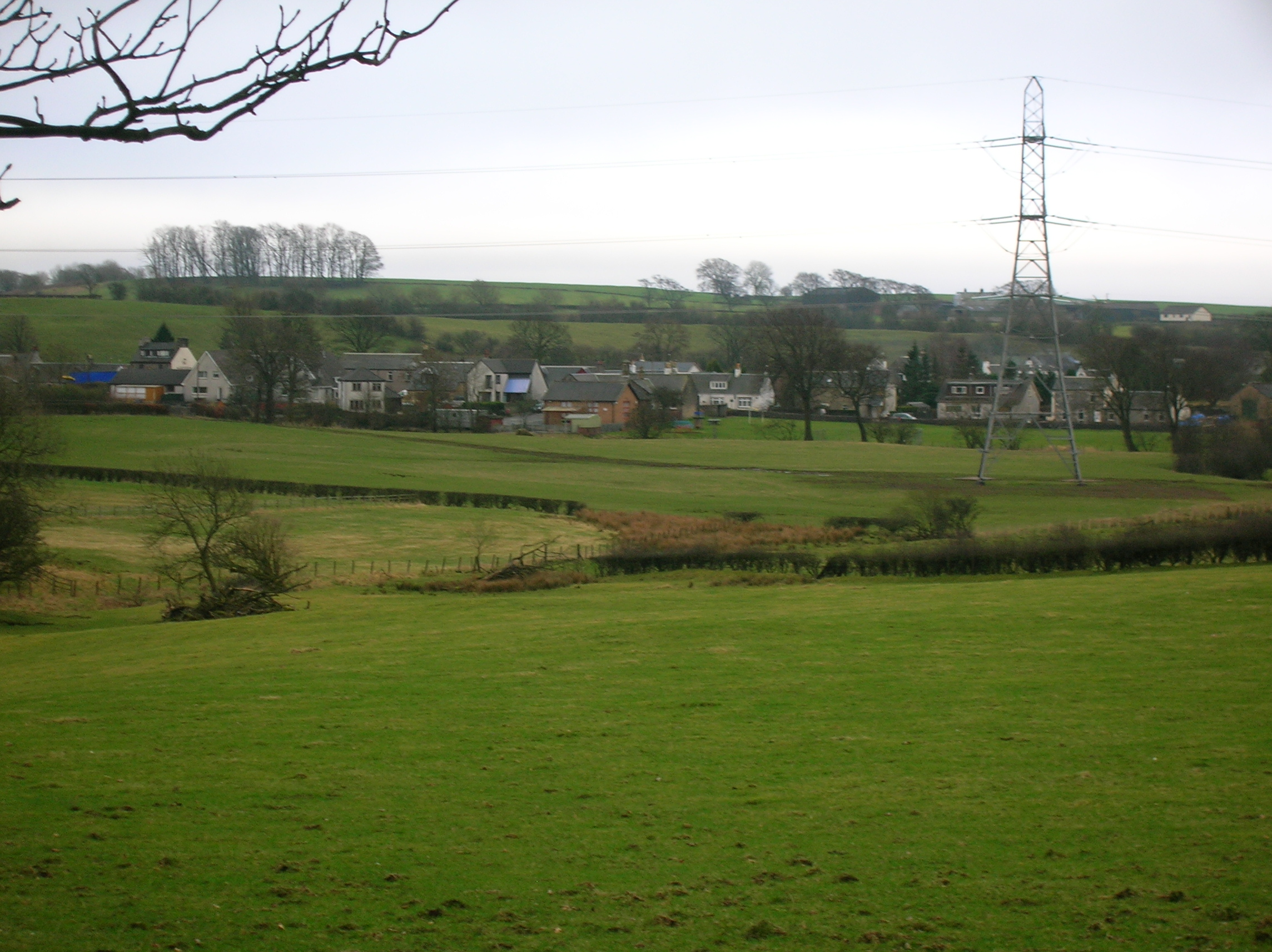
Gateside from the Hill of Beith old farm site

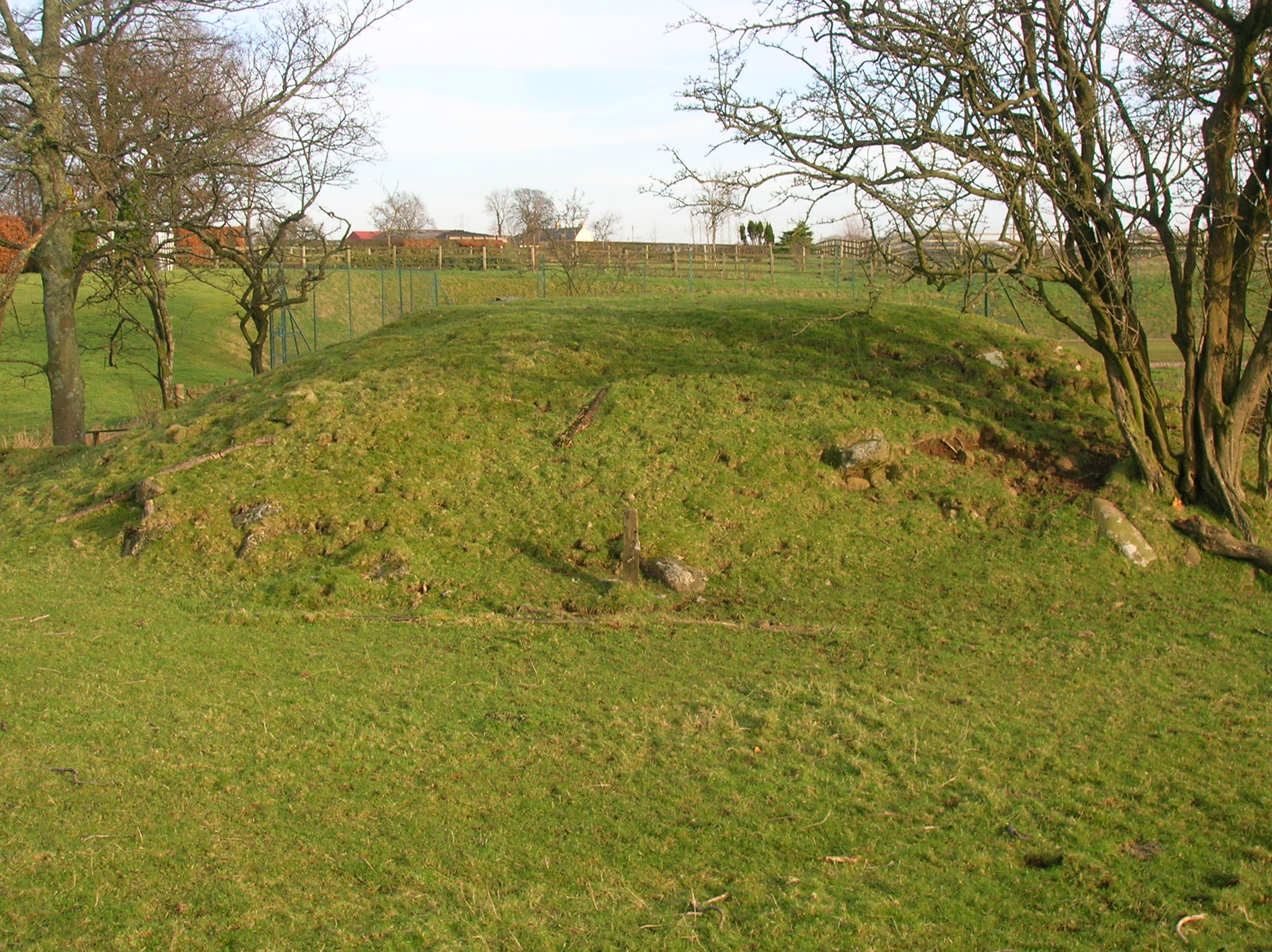
The Court Hill of the Abbot of Kilwinning near the village

A Moot hill or Court Hill survives near Gateside at Bog hall in the old Barony of Beith. Dobie states that the Abbot of Kilwinning used it to administered justice to his vassals & tenants. It is a sub-oval, flat-topped mound, situated at the foot of a small valley. A number of large stones are visible in the sides of the mound. It is turf-covered, situated on a low outcrop, and is mostly an artificial work. It pre-dates the channelling of the Boghall Burn which detours around it, the mound was probably isolated in this once marshy outflow of the former Boghall Loch (see NS35SE 14). Hill of Beith Castle, a square tower castle, once held by the Cunninghame family, stood near to the moot hill.

== Boghall Loch ==
Loch Brand or Bran was the name by which Boghall Loch was formerly known. The loch, drained in 1780, is one of the main sources of the Powgree Burn and lay on the lands of Boghall and Hill o'Beith. In the bottom of the loch piles, stakes of oak or elm have been found and it is thought that these may be the remains of crannogs. The site is now represented by a low, marsh and reed covered area (less than 2 ha in extent) centred at NS 358 543 on the OS map.

The loch was once the property of the monks of Kilwinning Abbey and it is recorded that in 1482 the monks took legal action against the Montgomeries of Giffin Castle and James Ker who were accused of dangerous destruction and down-casting of the fosses and dikes of the loch called Loch Brand. It is not recorded what effect these actions had upon the size and depth of the loch.

== Boghall Farm ==
This old habitation, marked as Boighall on a 1654 map, was the home to the mother, Janet Pollock, of Robert Tannahill the 'Weaver Poet'.

== Limestone and marble ==
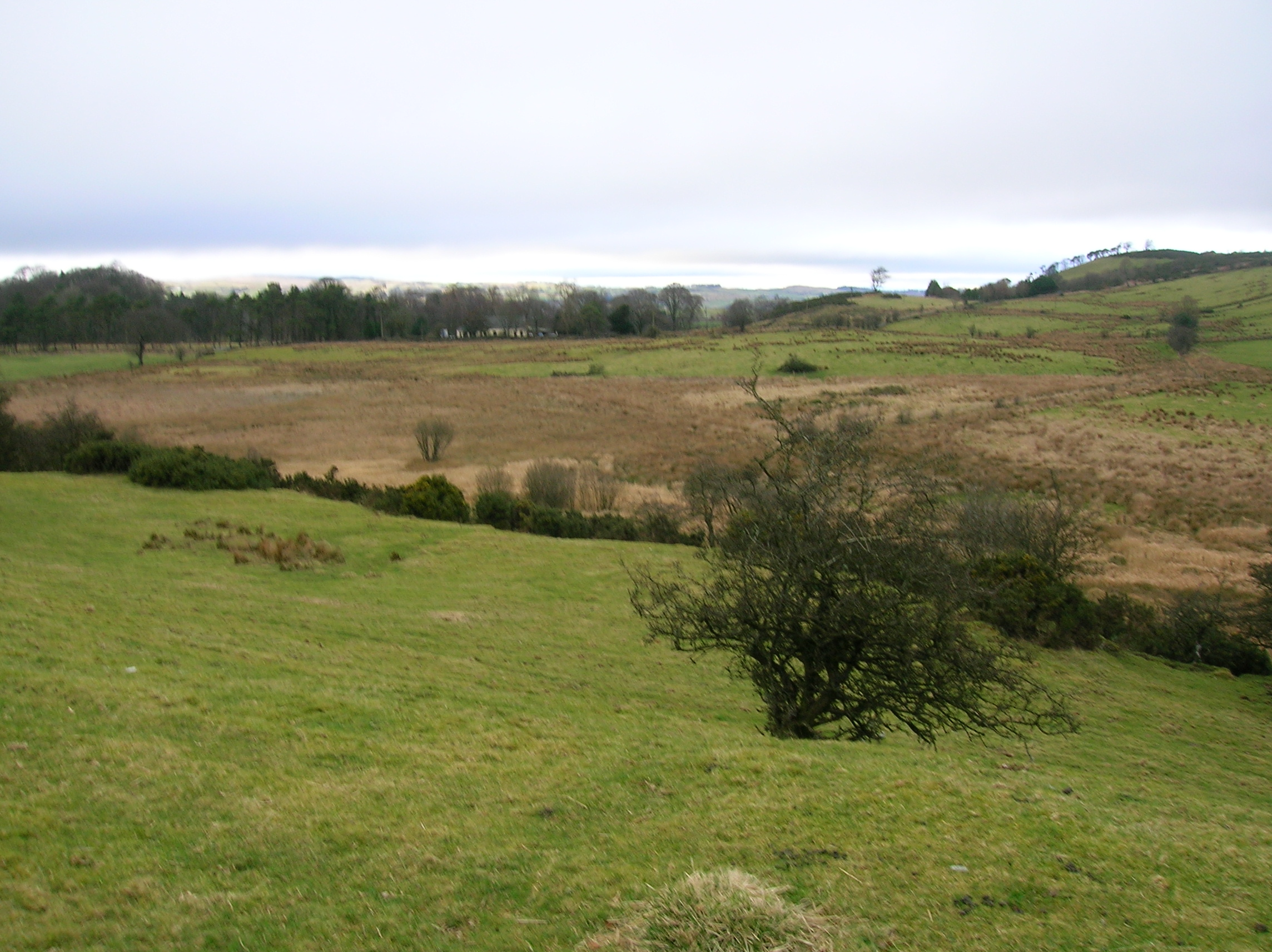
The drained Boghall Loch above Gateside, source of the Powgree Burn

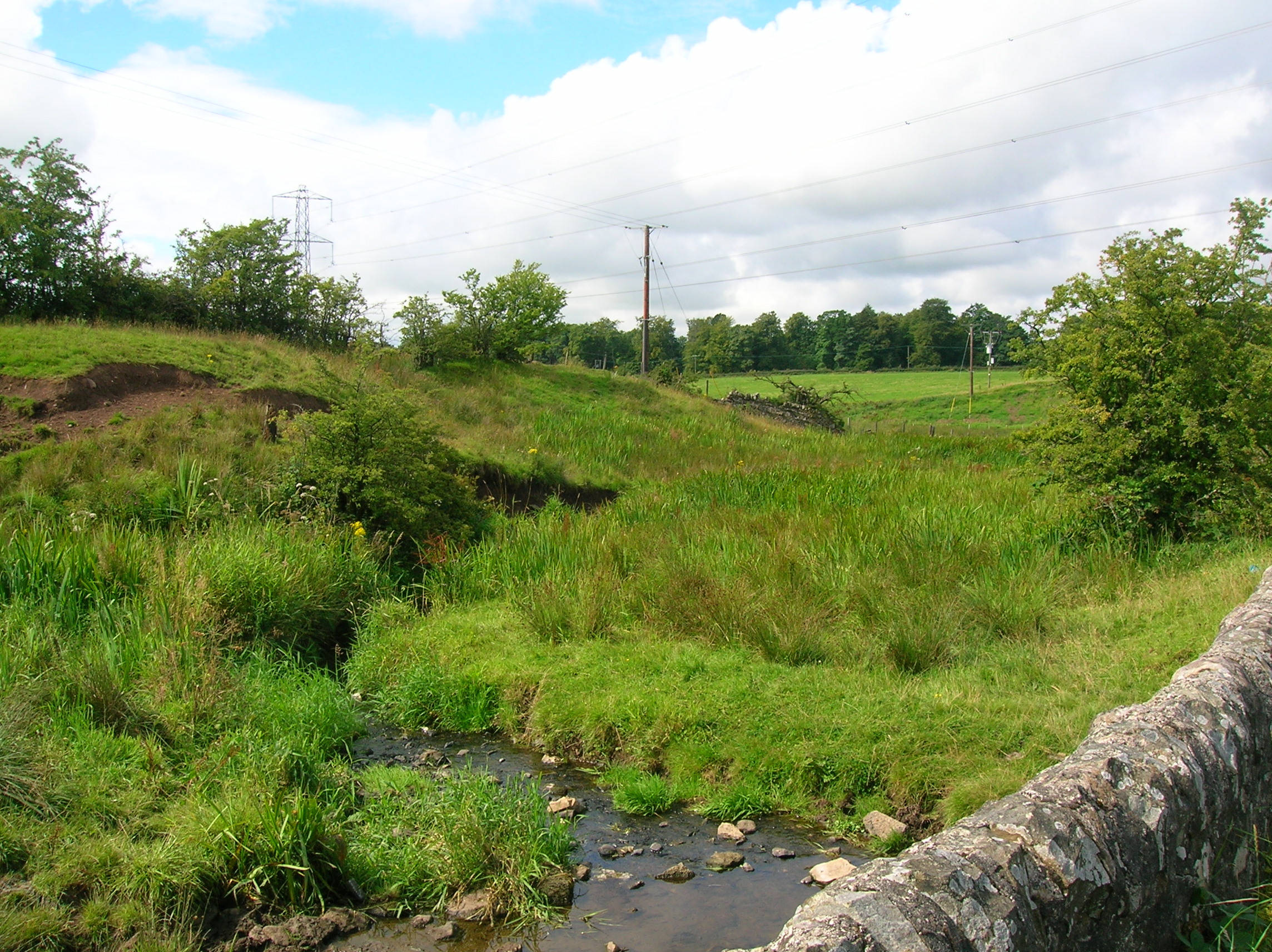
The old Crooked Dam millpond site on the Powgree Burn in the Fairy Glen

The underlying geology of this part of Ayrshire is such that the presence of limestone quarries is to be expected. Lime kilns to produce quicklime for improving the soil, were a common feature of the countryside before the process became fully industrialised. Nettlehirst near Barrmill was one of the last large traditionally operated lime kilns to operate, surviving until the 1970s. However, Broadstone has the substantial remains of one of the largest of the early stone built kilns. This must have created considerable pollution in the area, offset only by the employment it created. It sits right next to the limestone quarry which supplied it. The road running past is still known as 'Reek Street'.

The narrow gauge and single track 'Hillhead Railway', once ran from the Hillhead Limestone Quarries at Broadstone, down to the railway near Brackenhills railway station on the old line from Giffen to the Glengarnock Steel Works, later the Lanarkshire and Ayrshire Railway branchline to Kilbirnie South. The branchline to Beith via Barrmill did not exist at the time of the lines construction, not opening until 1873. A railway bridge was built to carry the Hillhead Railway over the new line and it must therefore have been fully active at that time.

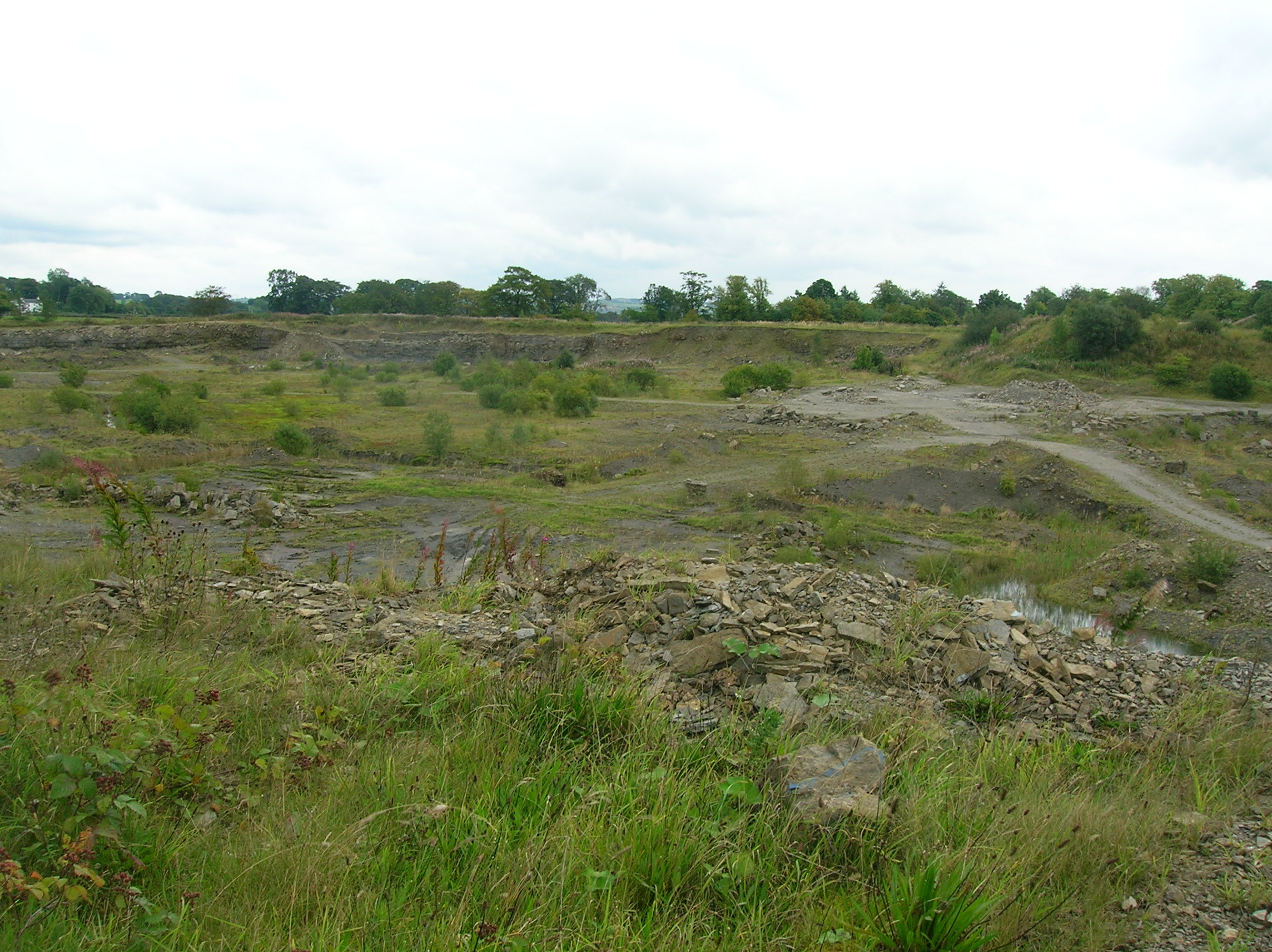
Trearne Quarry looking north

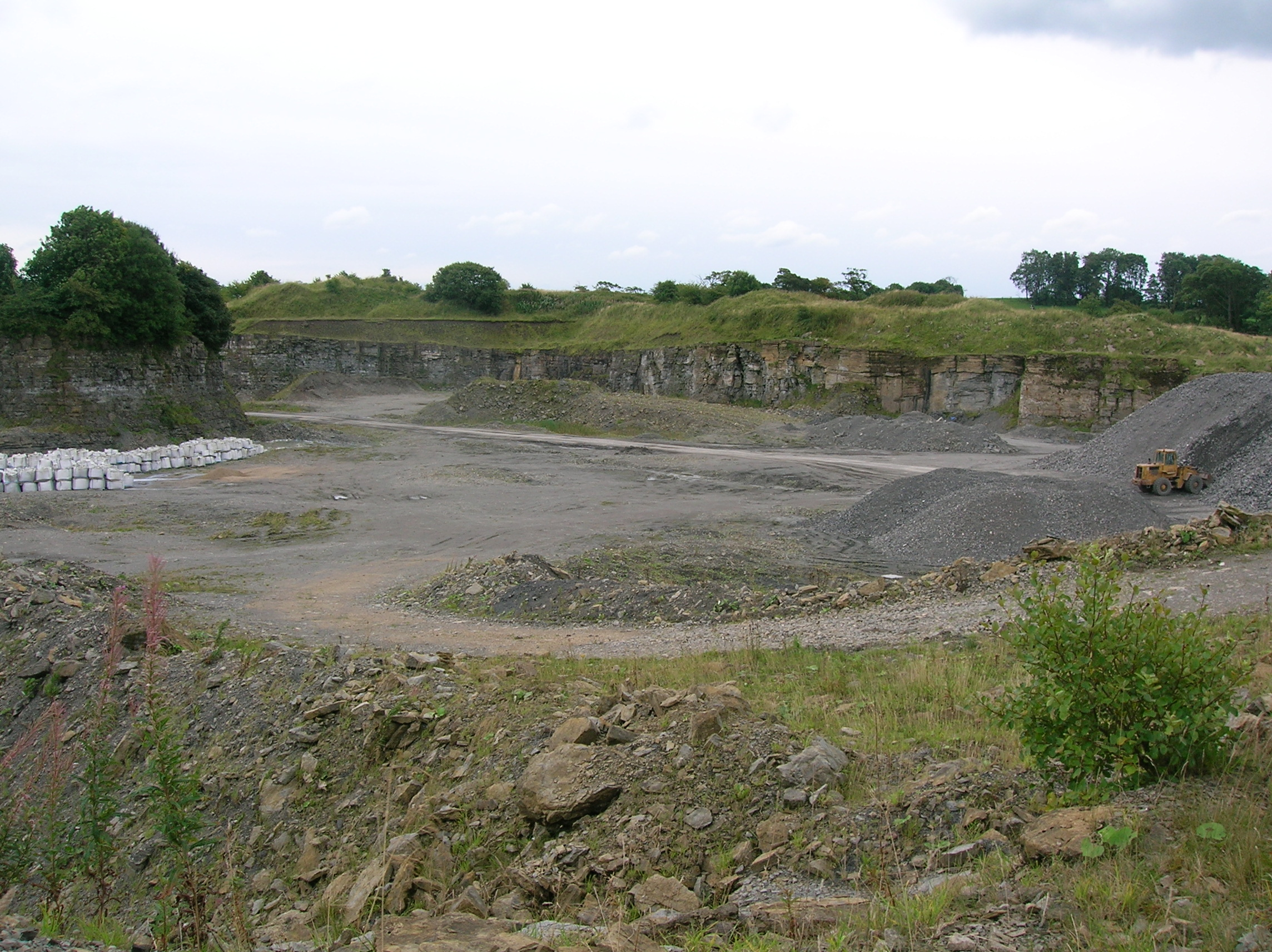
Trearne Quarry looking south

The Hillhead Railway is shown on the Ordnance Survey (OS) map of 1856, but not on the 1897 edition. The railway ran for several miles across what is now DM Beith land and ended up at first at an unloading point on a siding, where the limestone was emptied directly into standard gauge freight waggons. The map marks a few wooden railway bridges over burns and given the gentle gradients, it may be that the line was at first worked by horses rather than steam locomotives. Later maps show significant changes and record a 'Barkip Junction' and show the line now curving to meet what was by then the Kilbirnie branchline.

Hillhead Quarry was part of the Broadstone Limestone Works and the original Broadstone Farm was entirely lost to the limestone workings. Hillhead Farm was renamed Broadstone; a farm that still exists. Little remains of the railway apart from a shallow cutting running down from near West Broadstone, the overbridge near the old South Windyhouse Farm on the Barrmill Road and the route running to the site of old Barkip Junction.

The old Ordnance Survey maps show that a marble quarry was located nearby, being an especially hard form of limestone that could take a 'polish' and was used extensively for window and door surrounds.

== Views of Broadstone's industrial archaeology remains ==
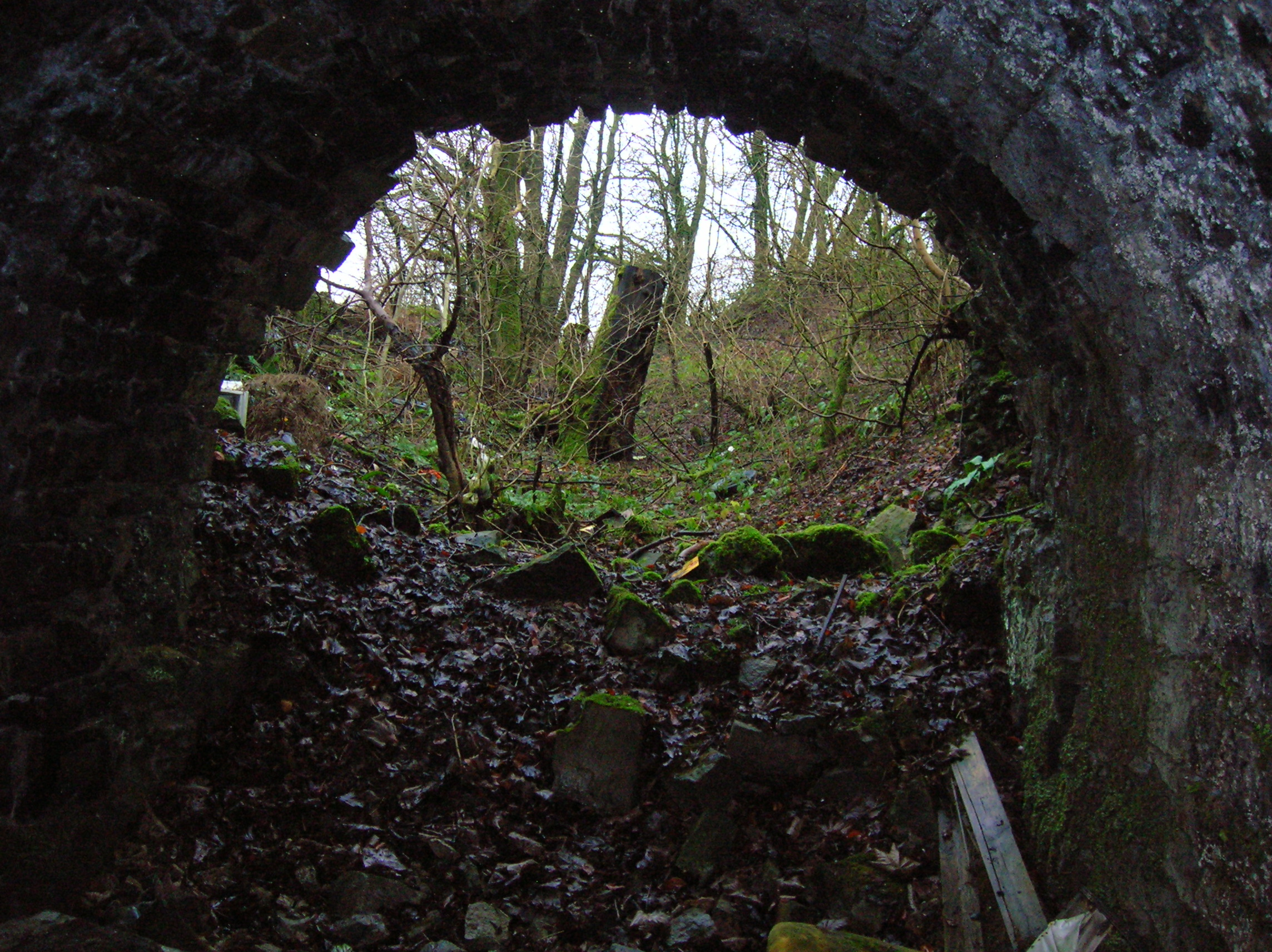
Looking out from one of the limekiln's two lower chambers

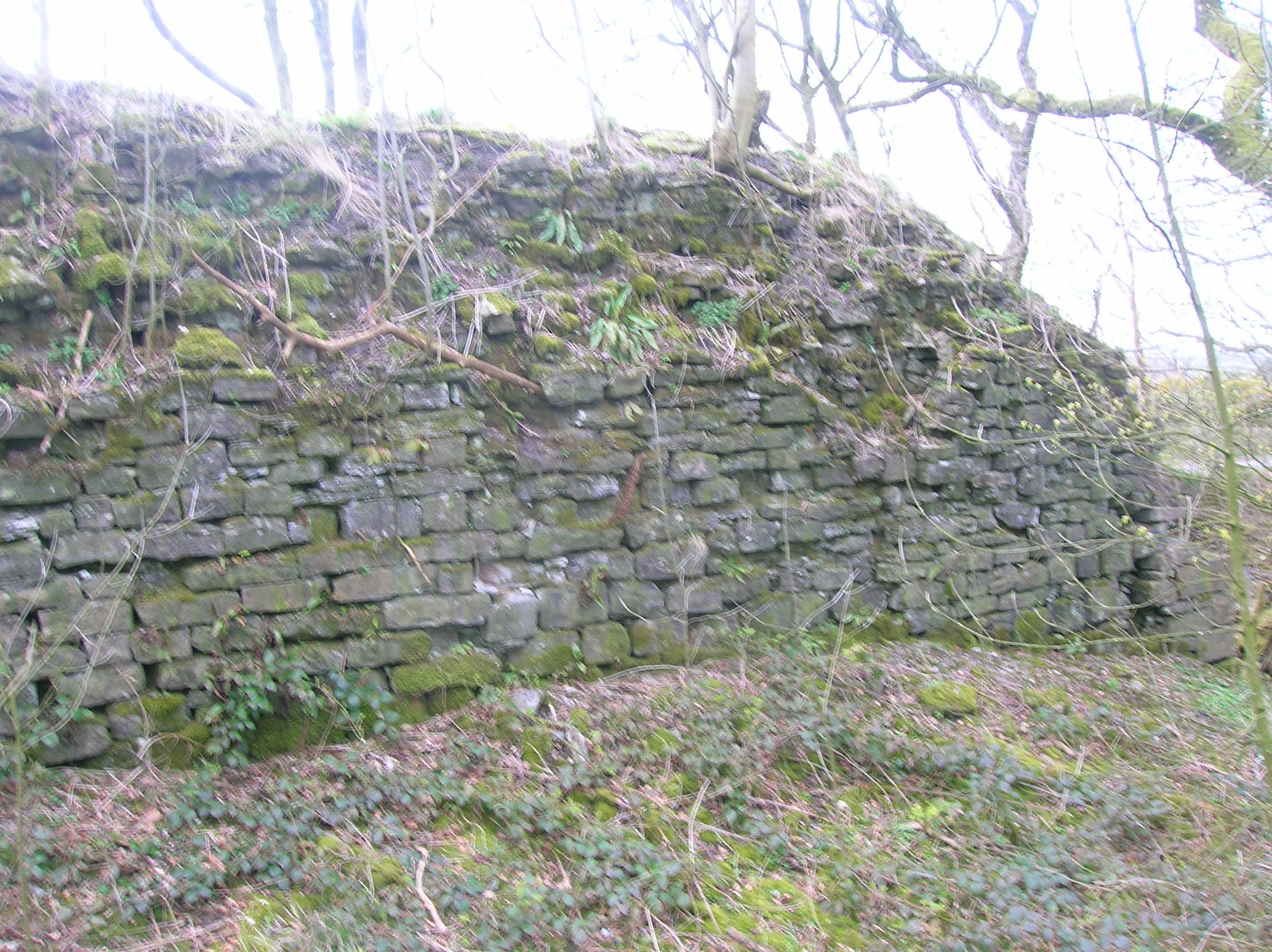
A view of the side wall

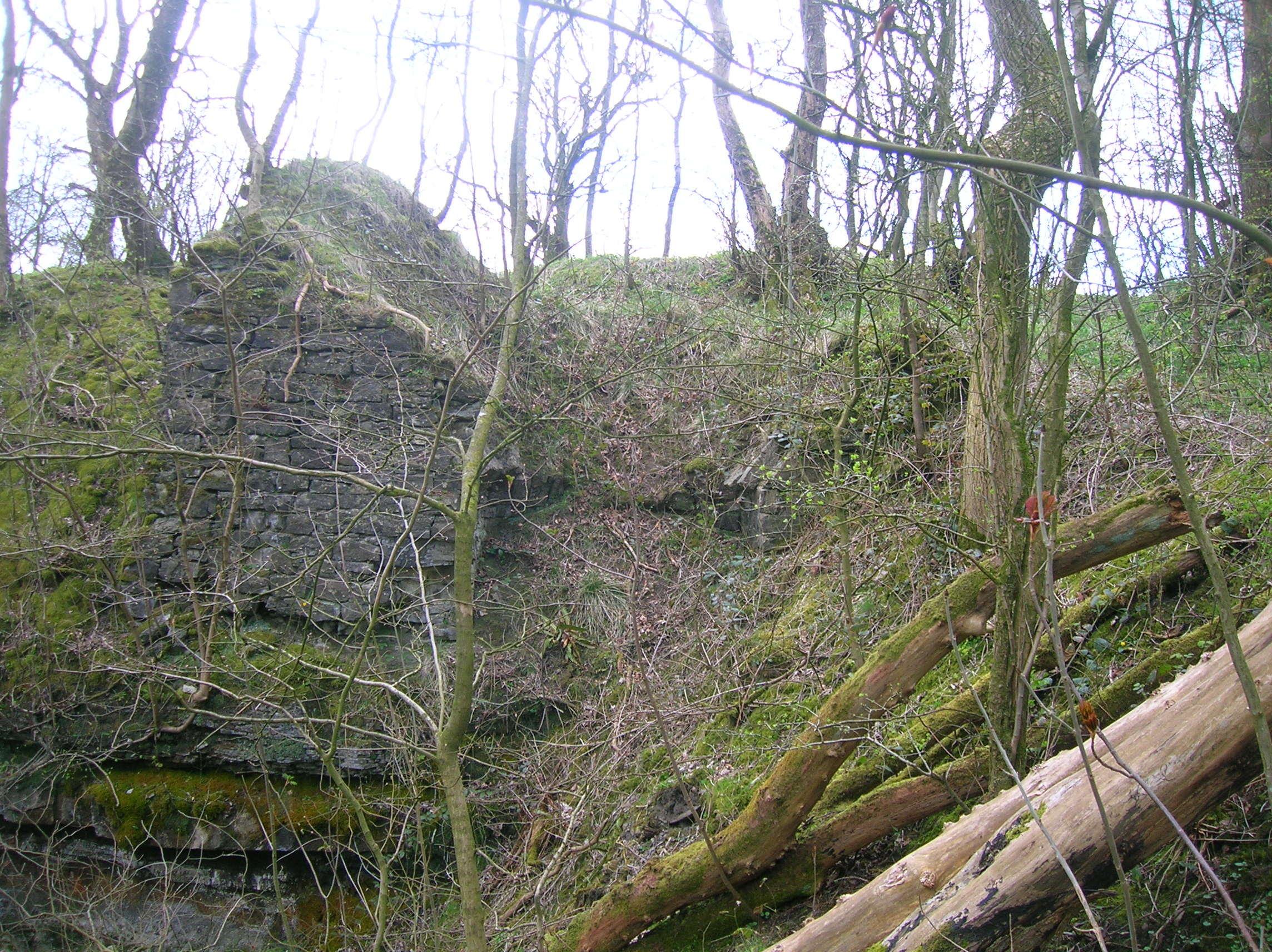
Another limekiln which may predate the quarry beneath

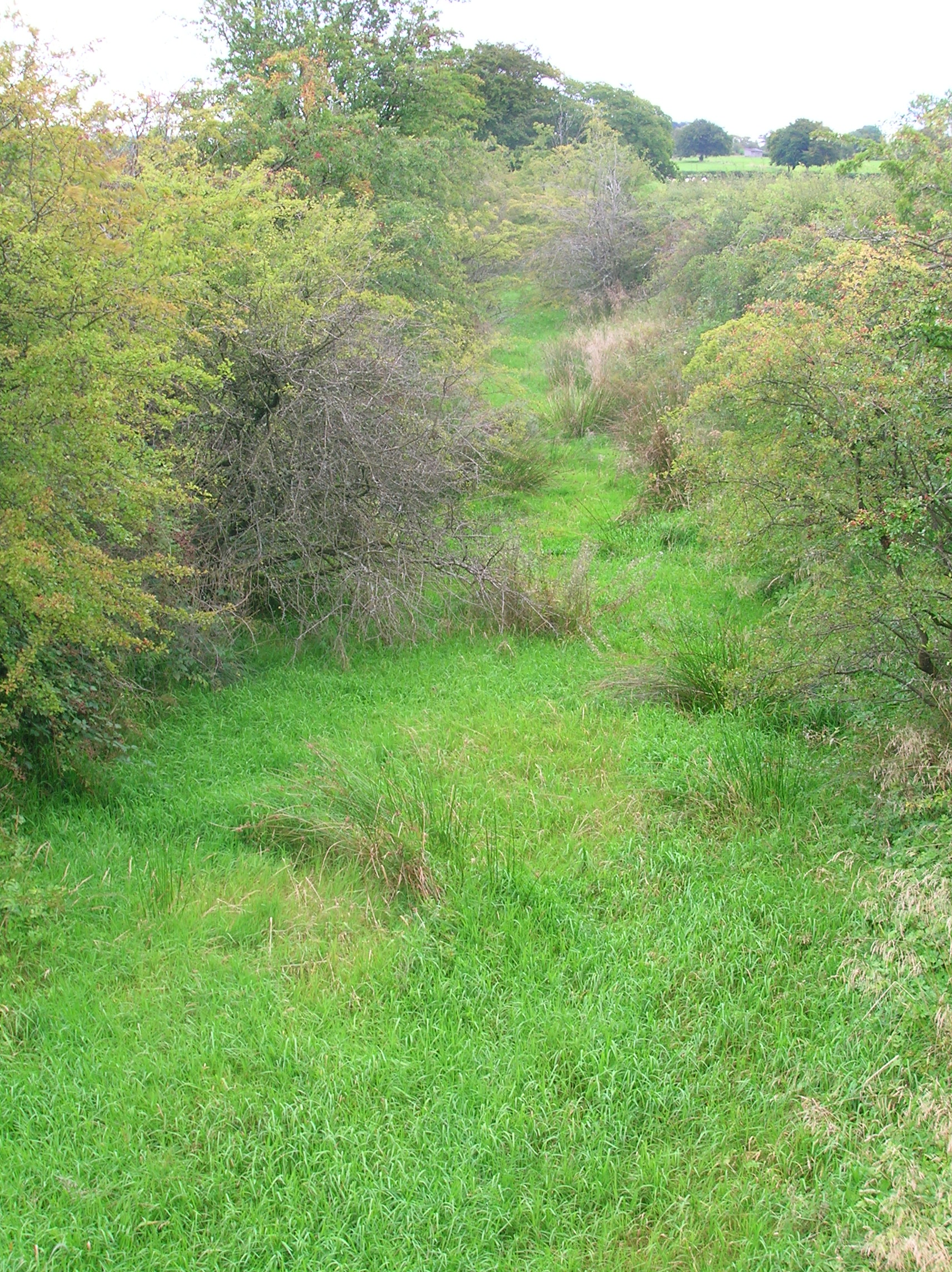
The course of the old 'Hillhead Railway' from Barkip Junction to Broadstone limestone quarry

=== Geilsland House and School ===
Geilsland House is part of Geilsland school, run by the Church of Scotland under its 'Crossreach' initiative. The name is pronounced 'Jillsland' locally. The origin of the name may refer to a gil or gyll, referring to a cleft or ravine as found at the 'Fairy Glen' where the Powgree Burn cuts through the fields. Geilsland school, run by the Church of Scotland, is located nearby.

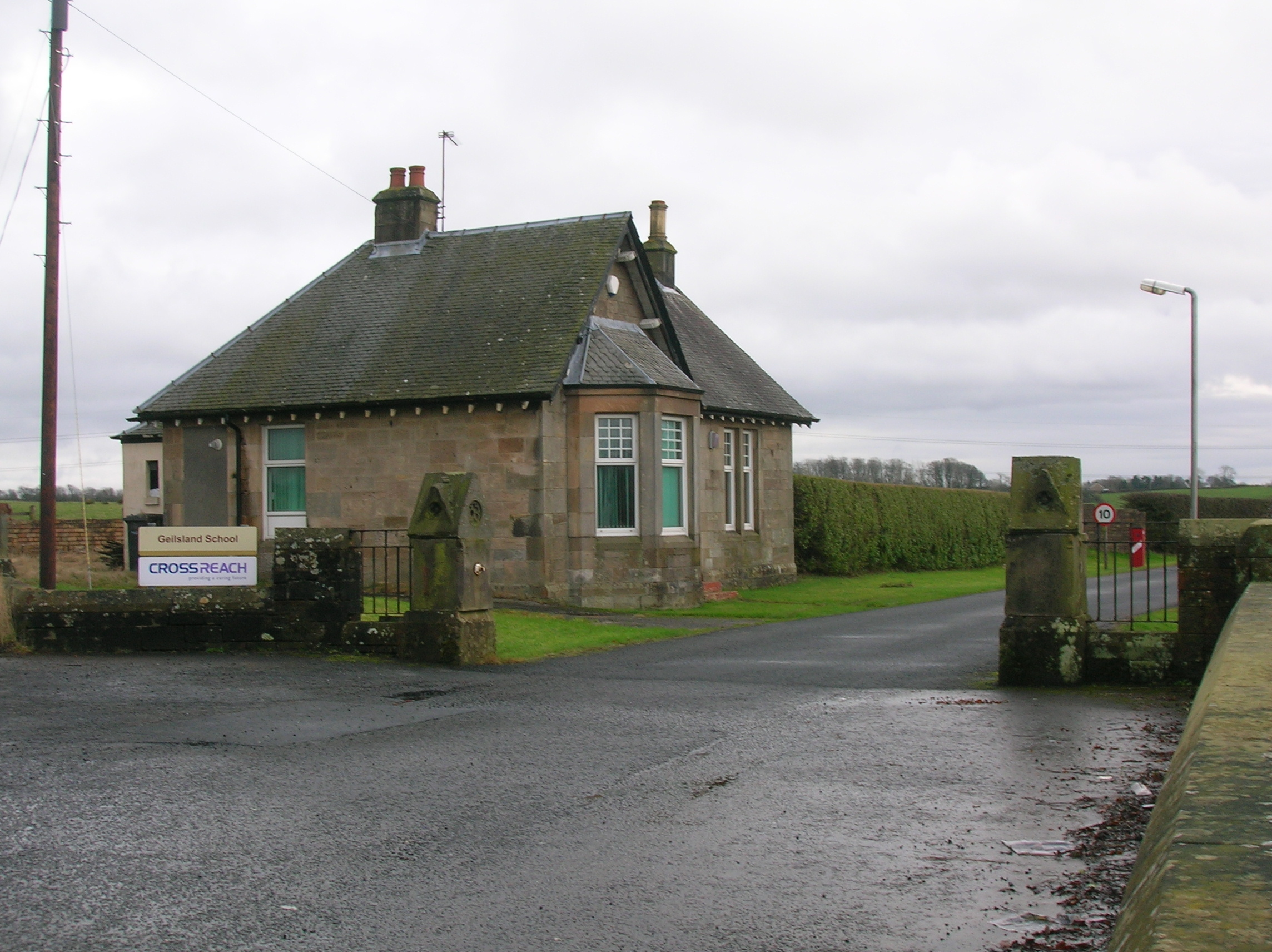
Geilsland Lodge and main entrance

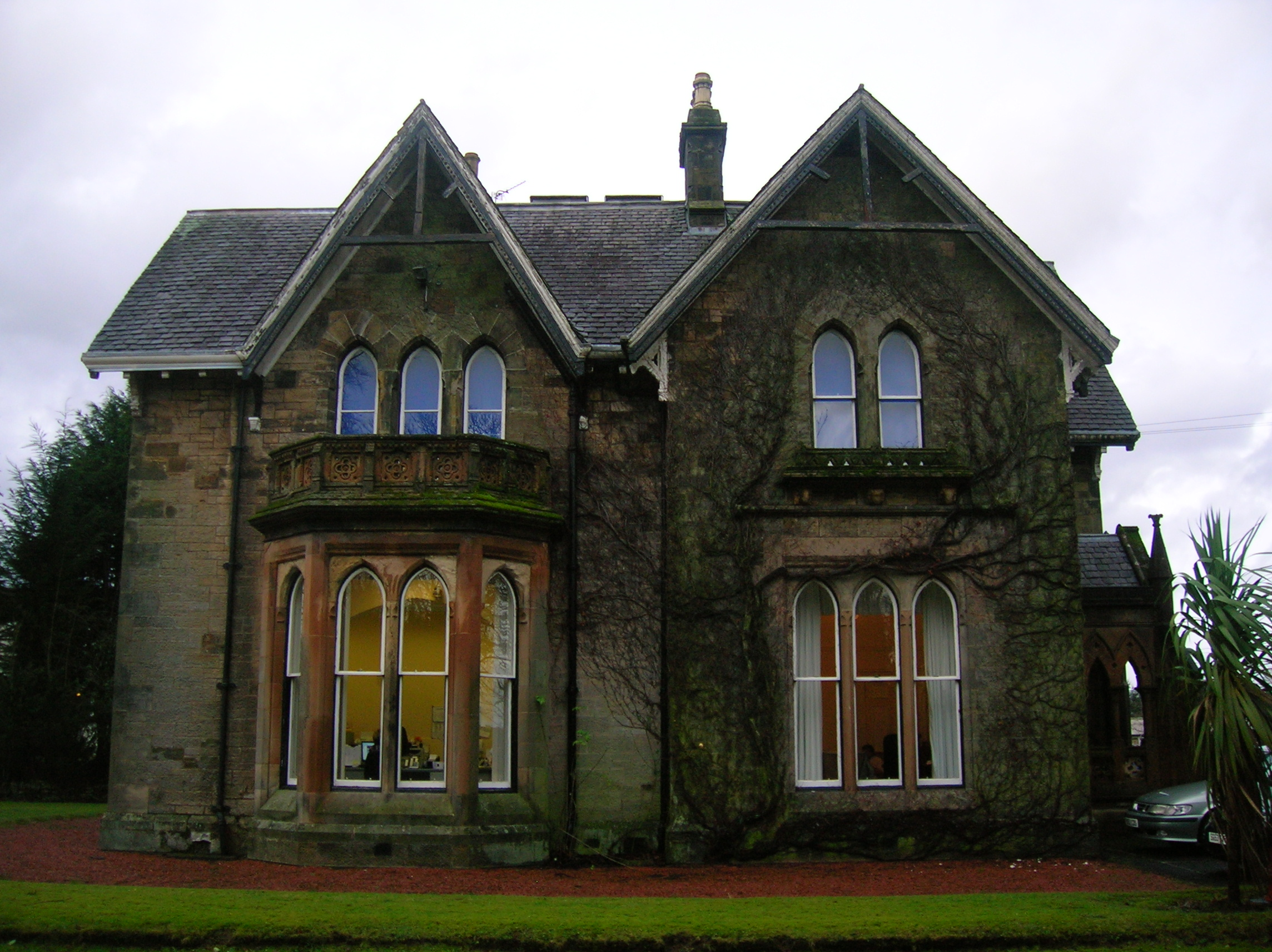
The side of the house which faces Geilsland Road and Speir's school grounds

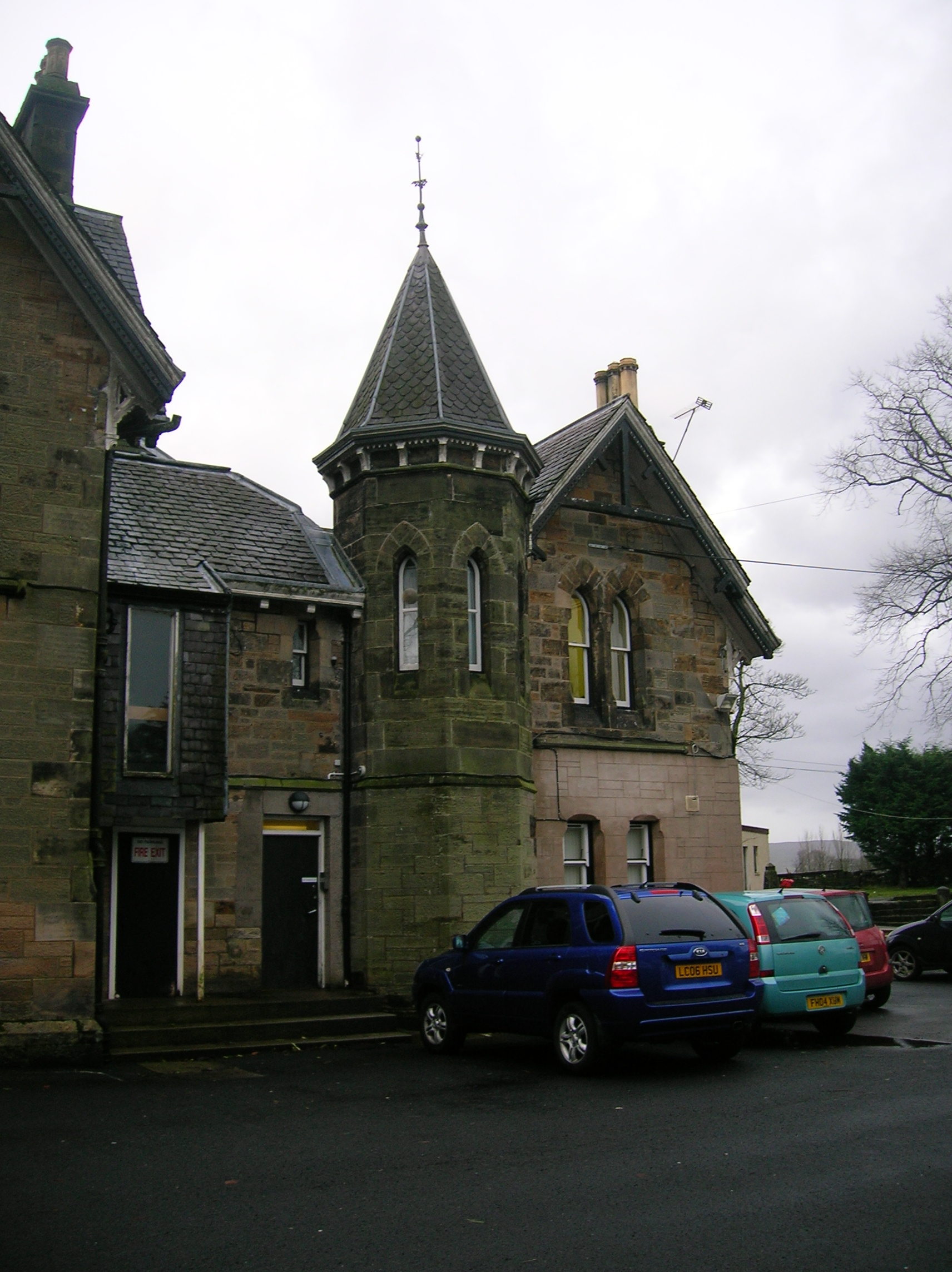
The front of Geilsland House showing later alterations

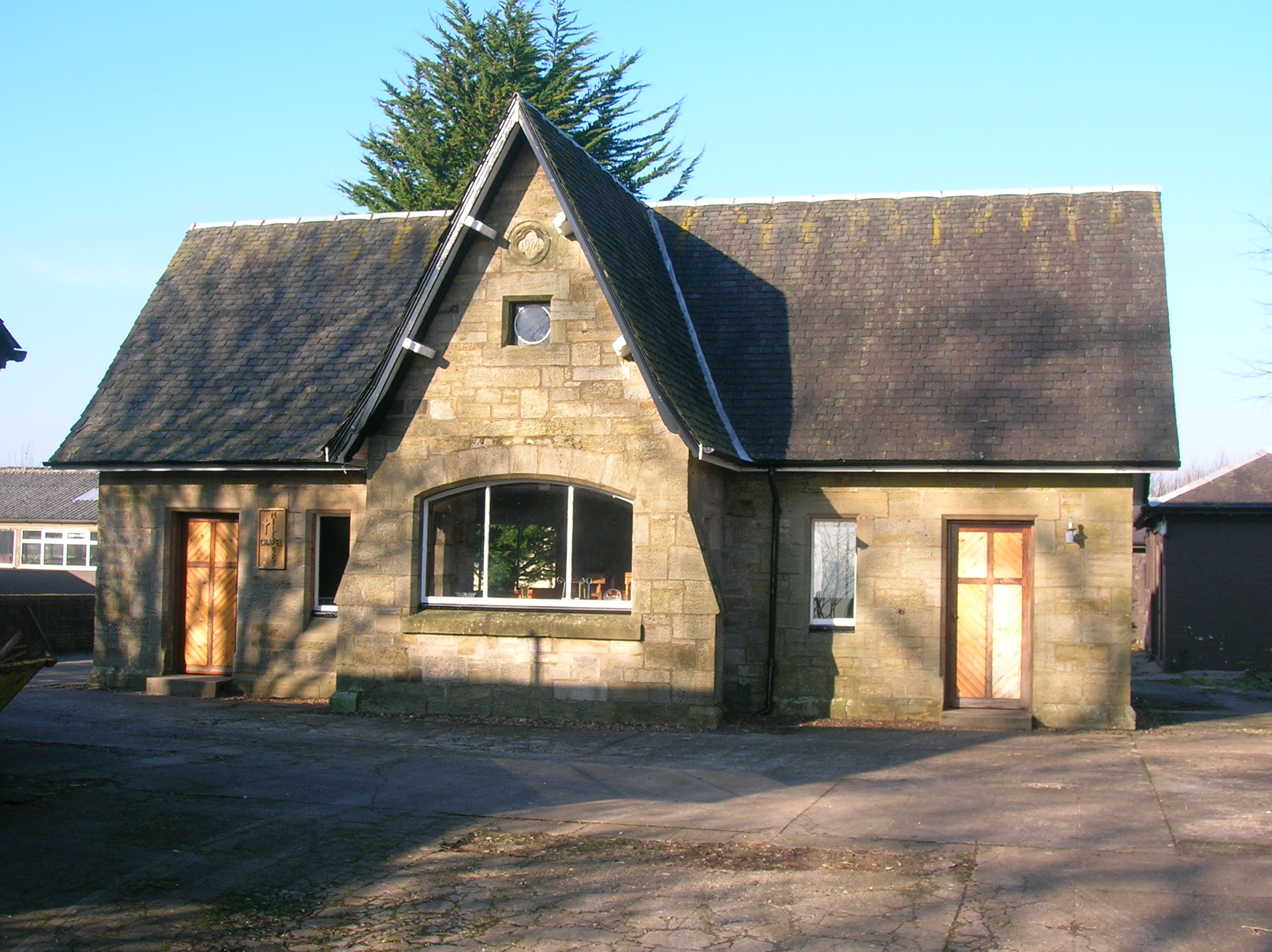
The chapel at Geilsland

=== The Gunn family ===
Gilbert Gunn was a well known railway contractor from Gateside and, in the early years of the 20th-century, was said to be one of Scotland's strongest men. For a bet, he had once carried a cheese, a ham, and a lade of meal for nearly one mile (1.5 kilometres). Gilbert and his wife Jane Speir were the parents of Mary Gunn who was the victim of an unsolved murder at Northbank Cottage near Portencross that took place in 1913.

== See also ==
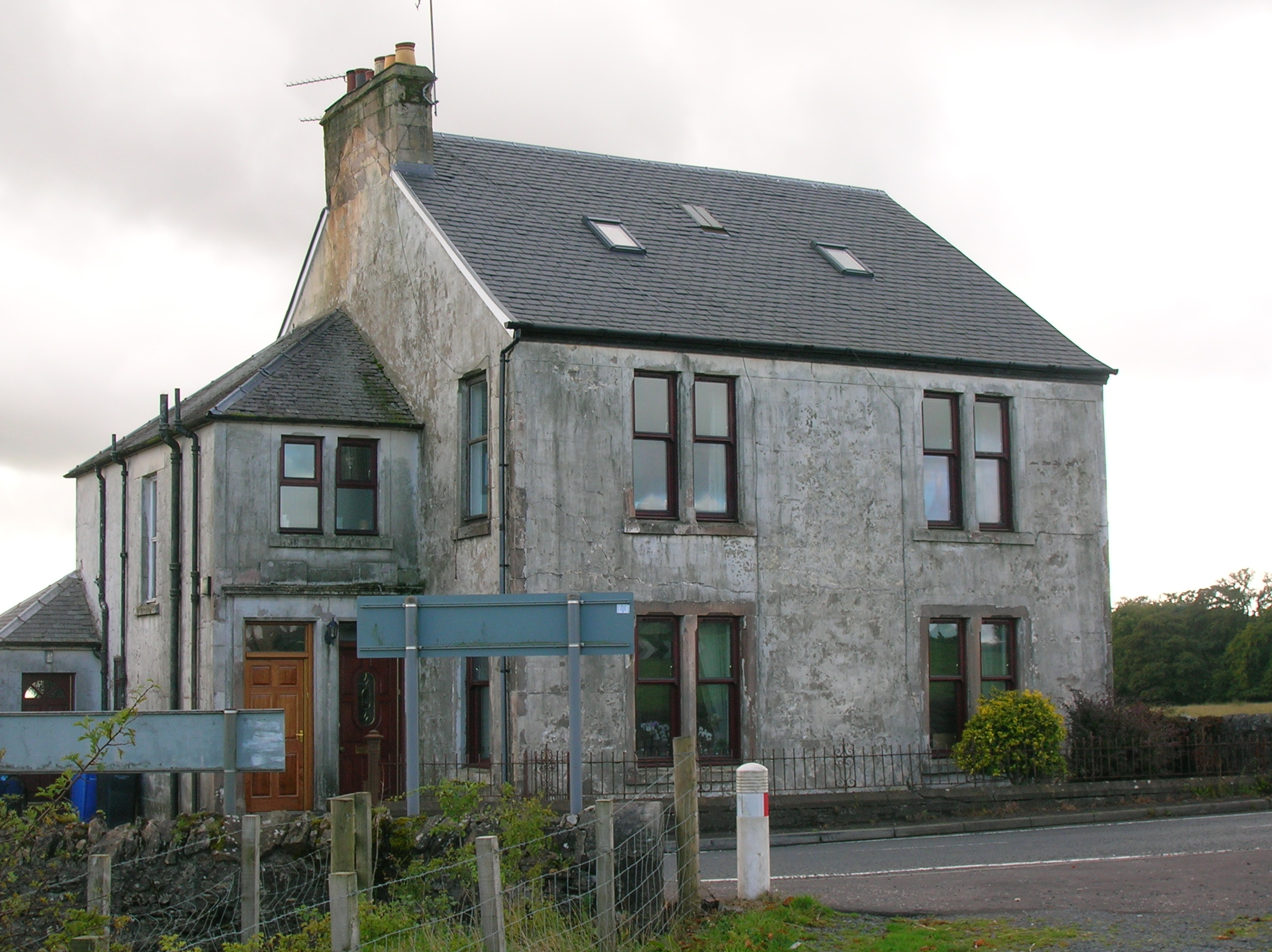
Netherhill old toll

- Hill of Beith Castle
- Hessilhead
- Barony and Castle of Giffen
- Barrmill
- Barony of Ladyland
- Broadstone, North Ayrshire
