= Loch Brand =

Loch Brand's site
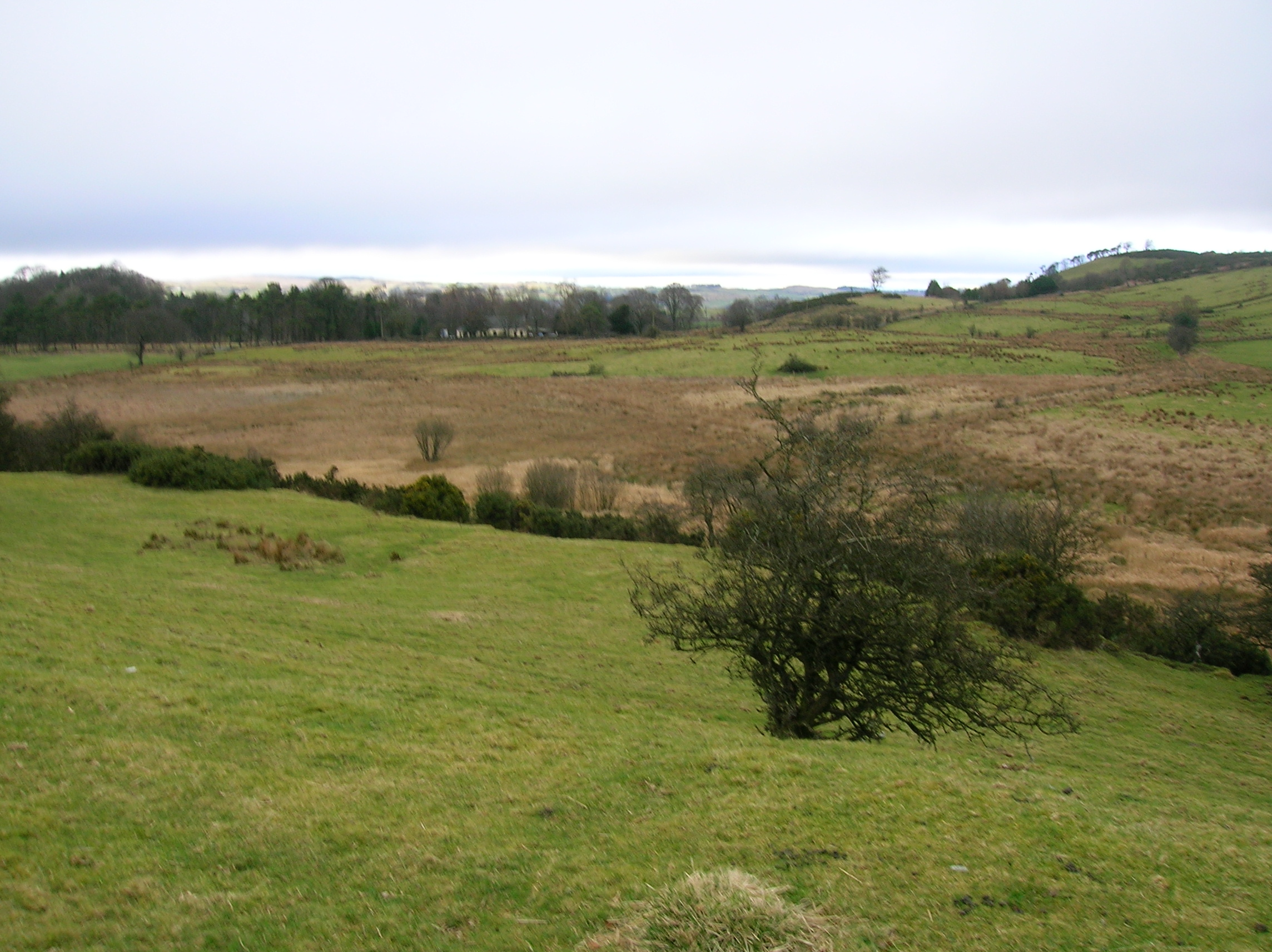
- The loch's site from near the ruins of Hill of Beith Castle

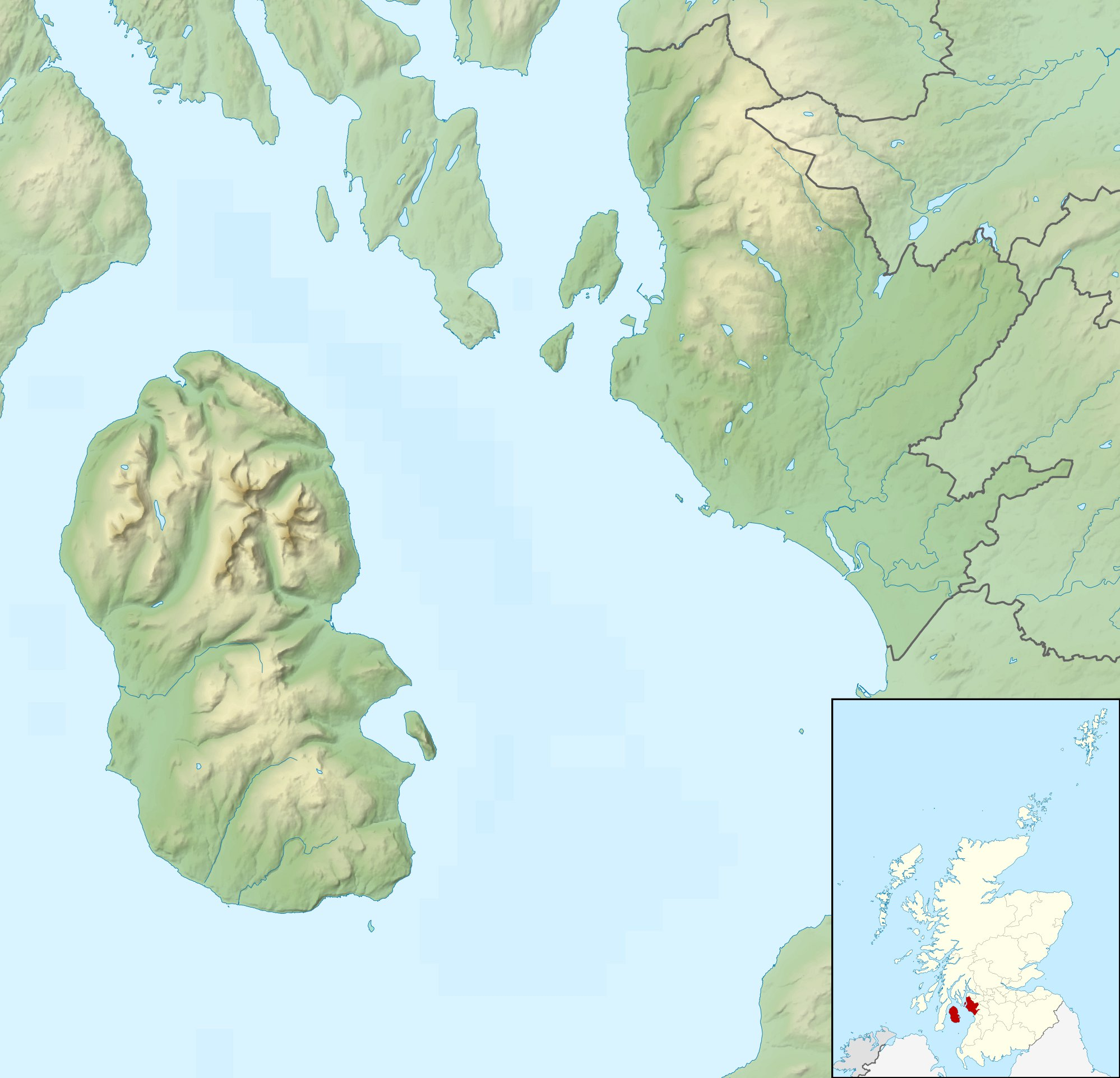
- Location within North Ayrshire
- Location: North Ayrshire, Scotland
- Coordinates: 55°45′14.2″N 4°36′52.8″W
- Type: Drained freshwater loch
- Primary inflows: Grange Burn
- Primary outflows: Boghall Burn
- Basin countries: Scotland
- Surface area: ca. 2 ha (4.9 acres)
- Islands: One crannog (destroyed)
- Settlements: Beith

Loch Brand or Loch of Boghall was a loch situated in a depression between the Grange Estate, Crummock, Hill of Beith Castle site and Boghall in the Parish of Beith, North Ayrshire, Scotland. The loch was fed by the Grange Burn and surface runoff, such as from the old rig and furrows indicated by Roy's Maps of the mid 17th century. The loch was drained by the Boghall Burn that runs passed the 'Court Hill' and into Powgree Burn at Gateside.

== History ==
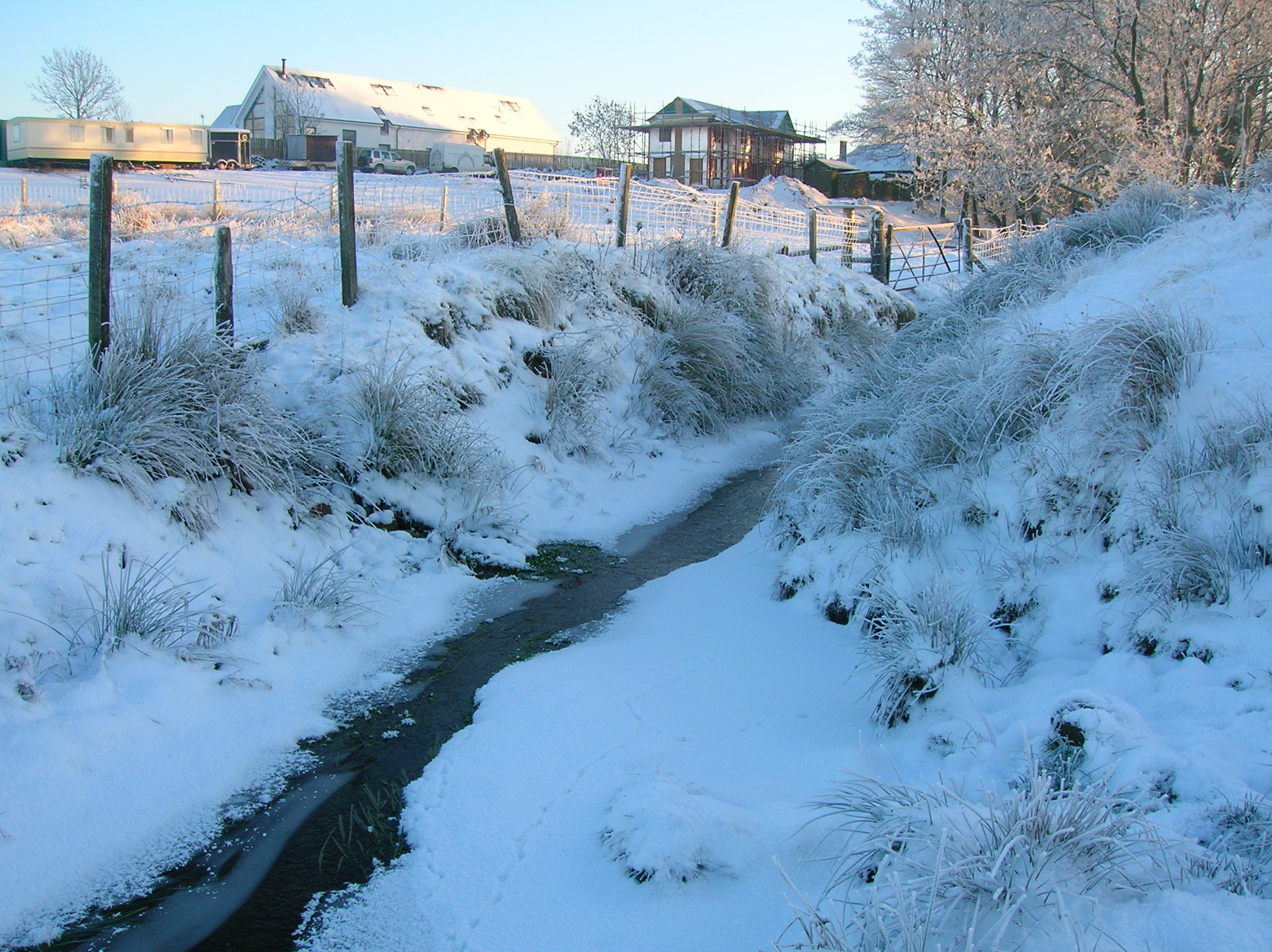
Site of the old dam.

Loch Bran or Brand was the name by which the Loch of Boghall was formerly known. The loch, drained in 1780, is one of the sources of the Powgree Burn and lay on the lands of Boghall and Hill of Beith.

Crannog

In the bottom of the loch piles or stakes of oak or elm have been found at various times and are thought that these may be the remains of crannogs or connected with fishing on the loch. Dobie, writing in 1876 states that the loch was drained about 60 years ago, thus about 1826. The 'cut' through the natural dam that once held back the loch waters below Boghall is clearly visible. The Boghall Burn runs from a drainage ditch through this 'cut'.

Land improvements

Land improvements and reclamation was taking place in many areas, for example in 1814 Barr Loch and the Aird Meadow was bunded and drained. Although the loch's drainage may have begun in the 15th century, Alexander Montgomerie, 10th Earl of Eglinton, was pursuing a number of agricultural improvements on his extensive estates in the 18th century and other landowners followed his example. Intensive drainage work may have taken place in the 1740s as part of the improvements undertaken to provide employment for Irish estate workers during the Irish potato famines of the 1740s and the mid 19th centuries. Many drainage schemes also date to the end of World War I when many soldiers returned en masse to civilian life.

The nearby placenames of Bogholm, Bogside and Boghall are self-evident as an indicators of the nature of the area.

=== A dispute ===
In 1482, when Loch Brand was the property of the monks of Kilwinning Abbey, it is recorded that the Abbot and Convent of Kilwinning took legal action against Robert Montgomerie and his brother John of Giffin Castle, William Montgomerie, Alexander Montgomerie and James Ker who were accused of dangerous destruction and down-casting of the fosses and dikes of the loch called Loch Brand. It is not recorded what the judgement was or the effect these actions had upon the size and depth of the loch.

=== Ownership ===
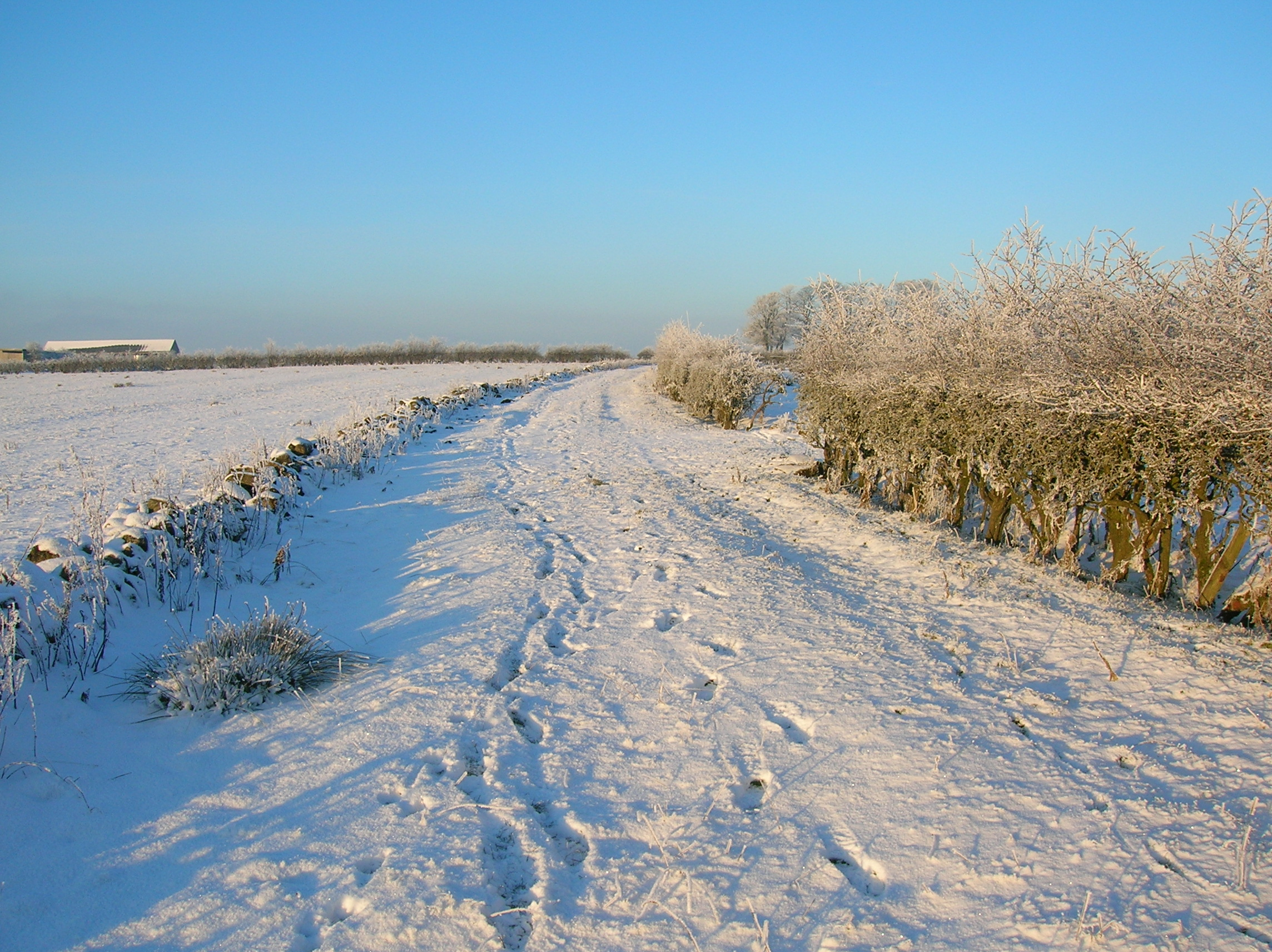
Access lane to Hill of Beith Castle ruins

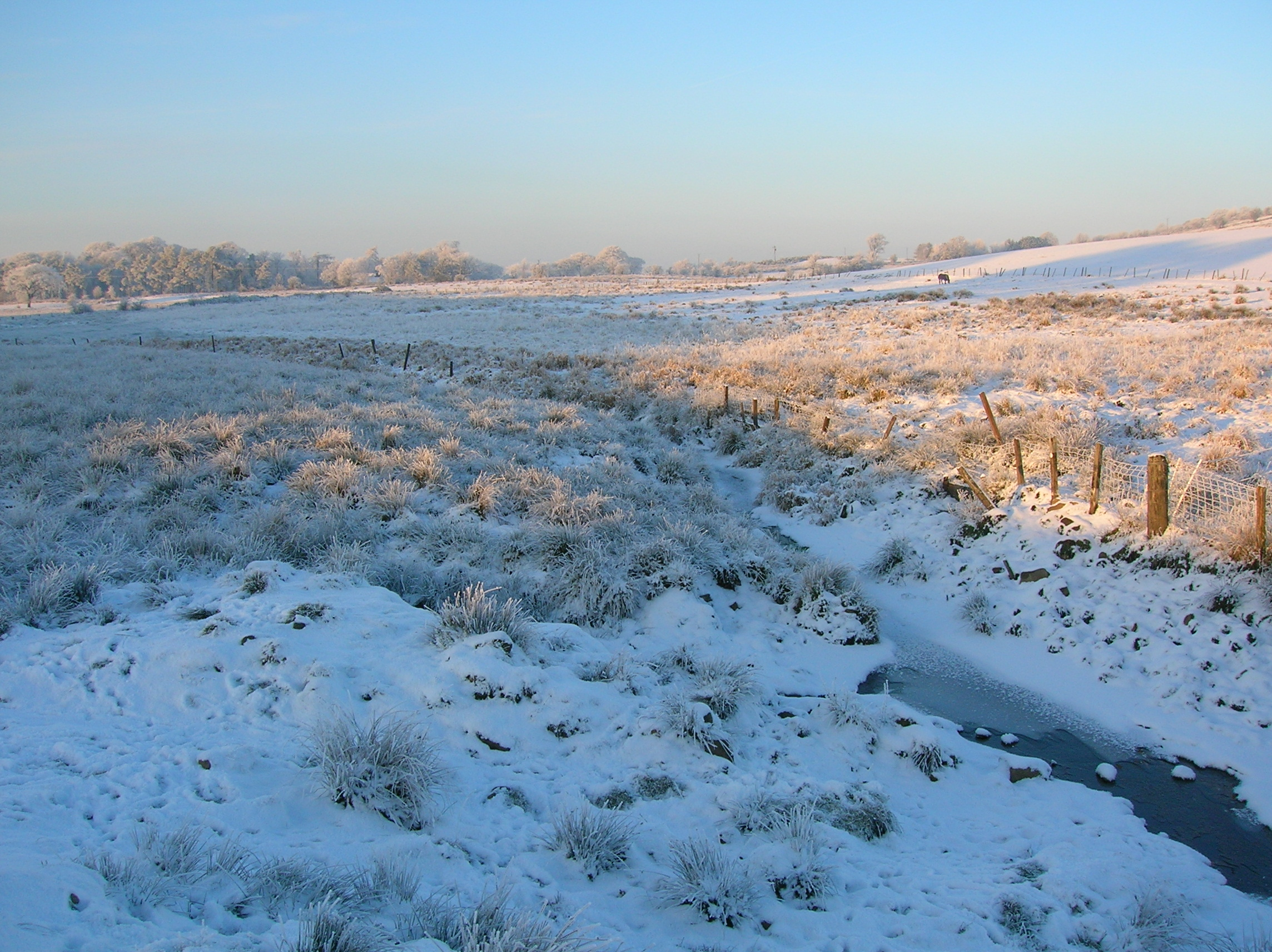
The site of Loch Brand from near Boghall

As stated, the loch and bordering lands once belonged to the monks of Kilwinning Abbey and to the Montgomeries of Broadstone who held the Lands of Boghall. In 1691 Hew Montgomerie held the lands and his son Mathew inherited them. The loch formed part of the Barony of Beith, which had been given to the monks in the twelfth century. The monks' Grange lay nearby in the vicinity of the present day Grangehill Estate. Yester Hill of Beith or Hill of Beith Castle was a successor to the lands owned by the monks, however the Cuninghames had sold the castle and lands of Hill of Beith by the end of the 17th century. In around 1798 Hugh Brown of Broadstone purchased the lands of Hill of Beith Castle and part of the loch lands.

== Habitats ==
The site is now represented by a low, marsh and reed covered area (less than 2 ha in extent) centred at NS 358 543 on the OS map. The Ordnance Survey maps of the mid 19th century indicate that the area was farming land devoid of marsh, bog, or wetland, however the area in 2010 is as stated above.

== See also ==
- Gateside, North Ayrshire

== Notes ==
=== Sources ===
- Archaeological & Historical Collections relating to the counties of Ayrshire & Wigtown. Edinburgh : Ayr Wig Arch Soc. 1880.
- Archaeological & Historical Collections relating to the counties of Ayrshire & Wigtown. Edinburgh : Ayr Wig Arch Soc. 1882.
- Dobie, James D. (ed Dobie, J.S.) (1876). Cunninghame, Topographized by Timothy Pont 1604–1608, with continuations and illustrative notices. Glasgow: John Tweed.
- MacIntosh, Donald (2006). Travels in Galloway. Glasgow : Neil Wilson. ISBN 1-897784-92-9.
- Smith, John (1895). Prehistoric Man in Ayrshire. London : Elliot Stock.
