= Hugh Montgomery =

Hugh Montgomery may refer to:

- Hugh Montgomery, 1st Viscount Montgomery (1560–1636), aristocrat and soldier, one of the "founding fathers" of the Ulster-Scots
- Hugh Montgomery, 2nd Viscount Montgomery (1597–1642)
- Hugh Montgomery (soldier) (1720–1779), landowner and soldier during the American Revolution in North Carolina
- Hugh Montgomery (sea captain) (?–1780), American sea captain of Nancy at the Battle of Turtle Gut Inlet on June 29, 1776
- Hugh Montgomery (Northern Ireland politician) (1844–1924), member of the Senate of Northern Ireland
- Hugh Montgomery (Royal Marines officer) (1880–1920), cricketer and military officer killed on Bloody Sunday
- Hugh Montgomery (British Army soldier), soldier found guilty of manslaughter in the Boston Massacre
- Hugh Lowell Montgomery (born 1944), American mathematician
- Hugh Montgomery (physician), director of the UCL Institute for Human Health and Performance
- Hugh E. Montgomery, director of the Thomas Jefferson National Accelerator Facility
- Hugh John Montgomery (1878–1956), merchant fox farmer and provincial politician from Alberta, Canada
- Hugh Montgomery, 1st Earl of Mount Alexander (c. 1623–1663), Irish peer
- Hugh Montgomery, 2nd Earl of Mount Alexander (1651–1717), Anglo-Irish soldier and peer
- Hugh Montgomery, 4th Earl of Mount Alexander (1680–1745), Irish landowner and politician
- Hugh Montgomery (Canadian politician) (1858–1926), Ontario farmer and political figure
- Hugh Montgomery (diplomat) (1923–2017), United States diplomat and intelligence agent
- Hugh Massingberd, also known as Hugh Montgomery-Massingberd (1946–2007), English journalist, genealogist and editor of Burke's Peerage

== See also ==
- Hugh Montgomerie (disambiguation)
- Hugh of Montgomery, 2nd Earl of Shrewsbury (died 1098), Anglo-Norman aristocrat
