= Viscount Montgomery =

Viscount Montgomery may refer to:

- Viscount Montgomery, of the Great Ardes (Peerage of Ireland, created in 1622)
  - Hugh Montgomery, 1st Viscount Montgomery (c. 1560–1636)
  - Hugh Montgomery, 2nd Viscount Montgomery (1597–1642)
  - Hugh Montgomery, 3rd Viscount Montgomery (c. 1625–1663)
- Viscount Montgomery subsidiary title of the Marquess of Powis (Peerage of England, created in 1687)
- Viscount Montgomery of Alamein (Peerage of the United Kingdom. created in 1946)
  - Bernard Montgomery, 1st Viscount Montgomery of Alamein (1887–1976)
  - David Montgomery, 2nd Viscount Montgomery of Alamein (1928–2020)
  - Henry Montgomery, 3rd Viscount Montgomery of Alamein (b.1954)
