= Mount Alexander (disambiguation) =

Mount Alexander is a mountain north-west of Melbourne, Australia. It may also refer to:

- Mount Alexander (Antarctica)
- Mount Alexander Road, Melbourne, Australia
- Shire of Mount Alexander, Victoria, Australia
- Earl of Mount Alexander, an extinct title in the Peerage of Ireland
