= Geilsland House =

Building in North Ayrshire, Scotland

Coordinates: 55.747244°N 4.623555°W

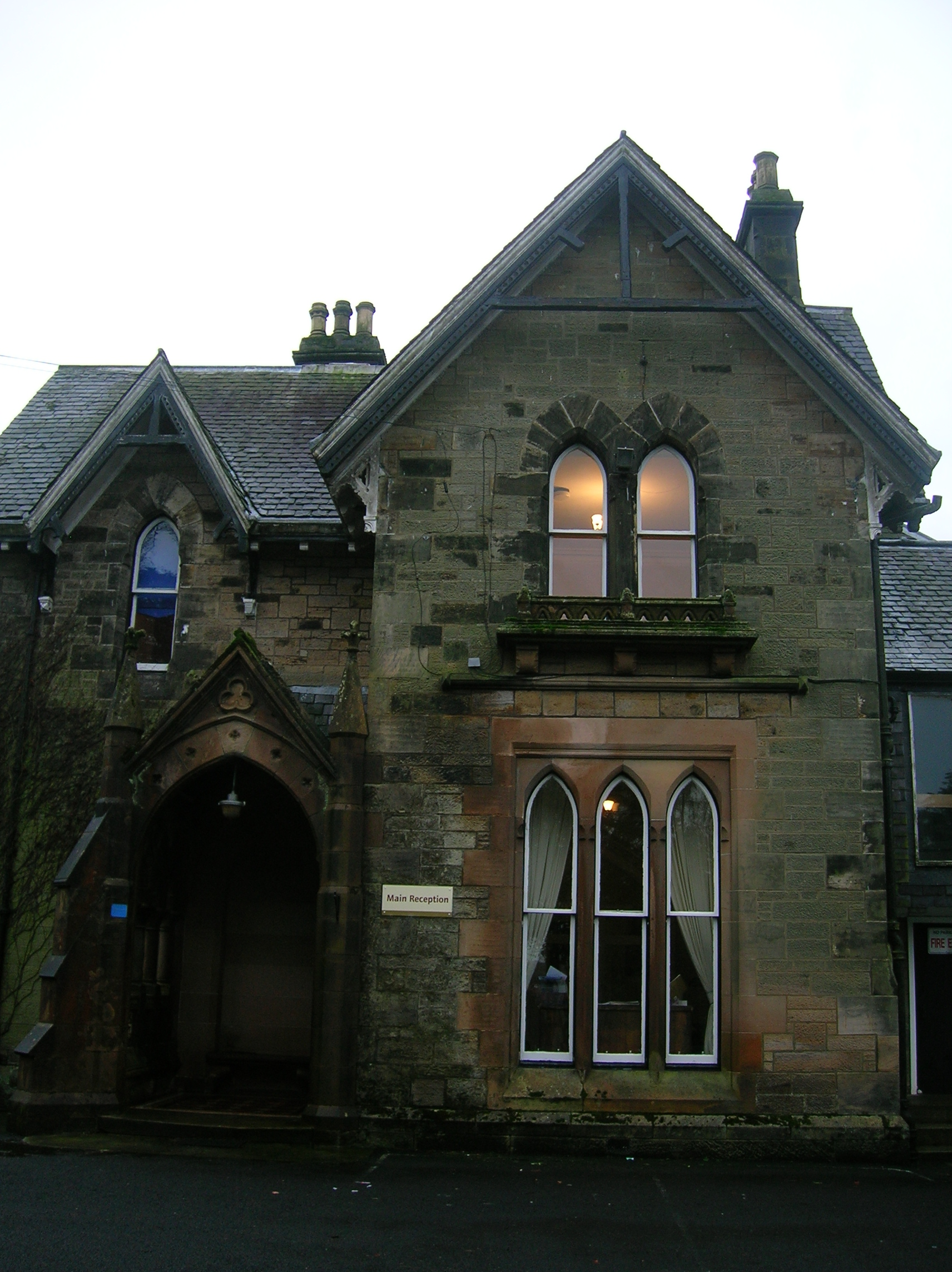
The main entrance to Geilsland House.

Geilsland House lies in between the village of Gateside and the town of Beith in North Ayrshire, Scotland. After serving as a private house it became a school and most recently (2015) has passed into the ownership of the Beith Development Community Trust.

== History ==
Geilsland was a half merk land, part of the 4 merk land of Marshalland of old extent, in the Barony of Braidstone. An earlier name is said to have been 'Neilsland'. The name is pronounced 'Jillsland' locally. The origin of the name may refer to a gil or gyll, referring to a cleft or ravine as found at the 'Fairy Glen' where the Powgree Burn cuts through the fields.

The lands of Geilsland were bounded to the south and west by the lands held by James Kerr; by the Lands of Crummock held by Fanny Brown; by the lands of Little Hill of Beith once held by John Shedden and then by Alexander Aitkenhead and finally by the road from Beith to Broadstone.

=== Owners ===
In 1672 the lands were held by John Anderson of Cruckhills whose wife was Janet Barclay. Thomas had inherited by 1697 and then James Anderson. The lands of Cruckhills (near Balgray and Hessilhead) separately passed into the ownership of Hugh Wilson Robert Pollock purchased the lands of Geilsland in 1761 and by 1767 the Crawford family had obtained title with Thomas and John holding the lands prior to William Fulton Love's acquisition in 1867.

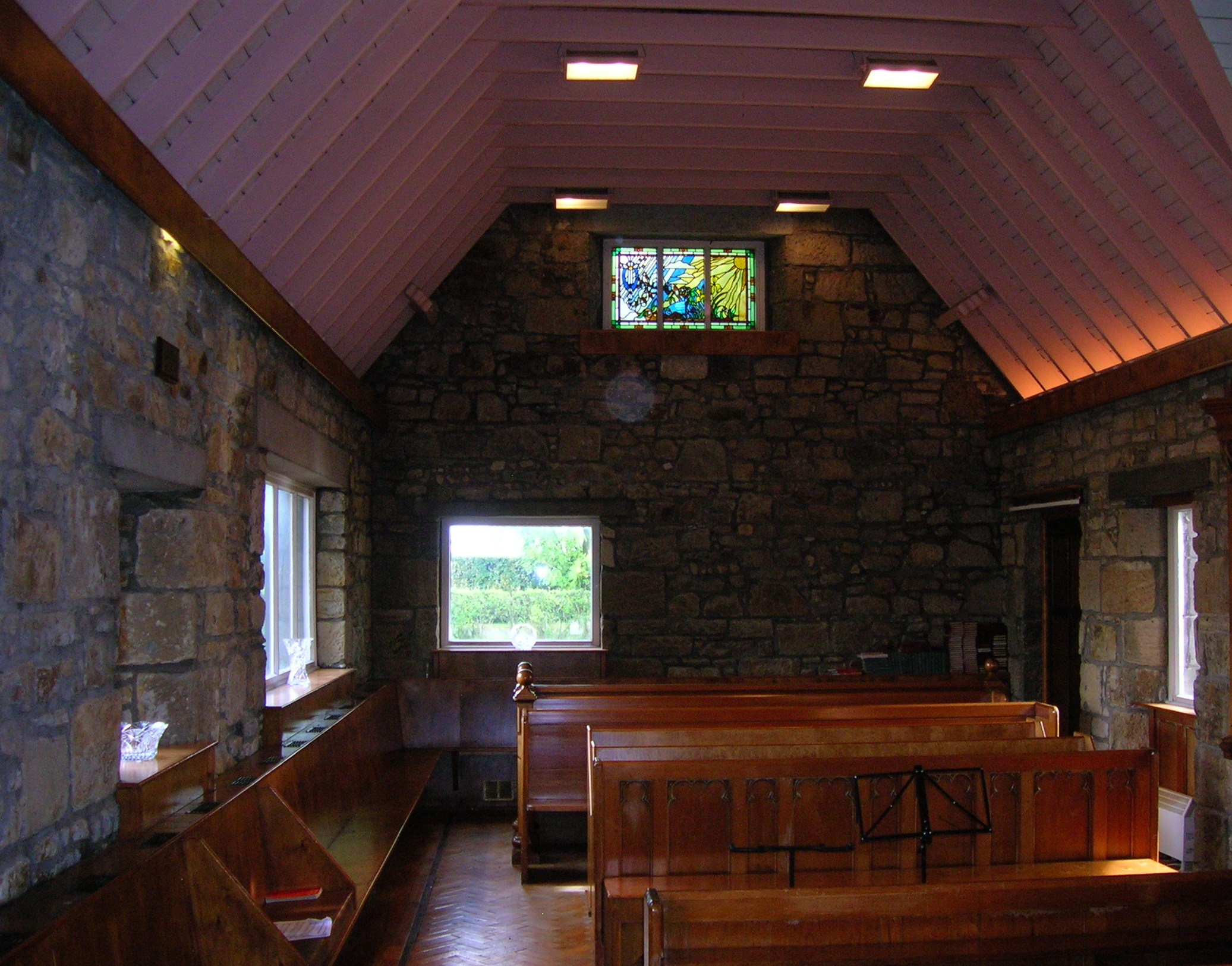
An internal view of the Millport Chapel

On 7 June 1902 the local paper reported The purchaser of Geilsland is Mr Warren, wine and spirit merchant, Glasgow, who is a brother of Mr Warren, of the firm Warren and Stewart, engineers, who have had control of the various local schemes in connection with water and drainage for a number of years back. Thomas, John and Timothy Warren inherited in turn before an insurance manager, Robert James Cecil Govan and his wife Jean Kinniburgh Templeton purchased the property in around 1923.

In 1942 a builder, Charles Scott Gray purchased Geilsland for £1750, followed by Norman Dunlop McCombe family who were involved in the fruit trade. The Church of Scotland then obtained and used the house, chapel, gymnasium and dormitory blocks from 1963 as a special school until closure of the facility in 2015 and its sale to the Beith Development Community Trust Ltd. later that year.

=== Geilsland House and grounds ===
Geilsland was sold in four lots and in 1867 two of these lots were purchased by Wiliam Fulton Love, writer and bank agent in Beith. He built a handsome villa and gatehouse, in the domestic Gothic style, and enclosed and planted 5 acres (20,000 m^{2}) around the villa. The Millport Chapel, situated within the grounds, was fitted out with items from an old church that once stood on the Isle of Cumbrae.

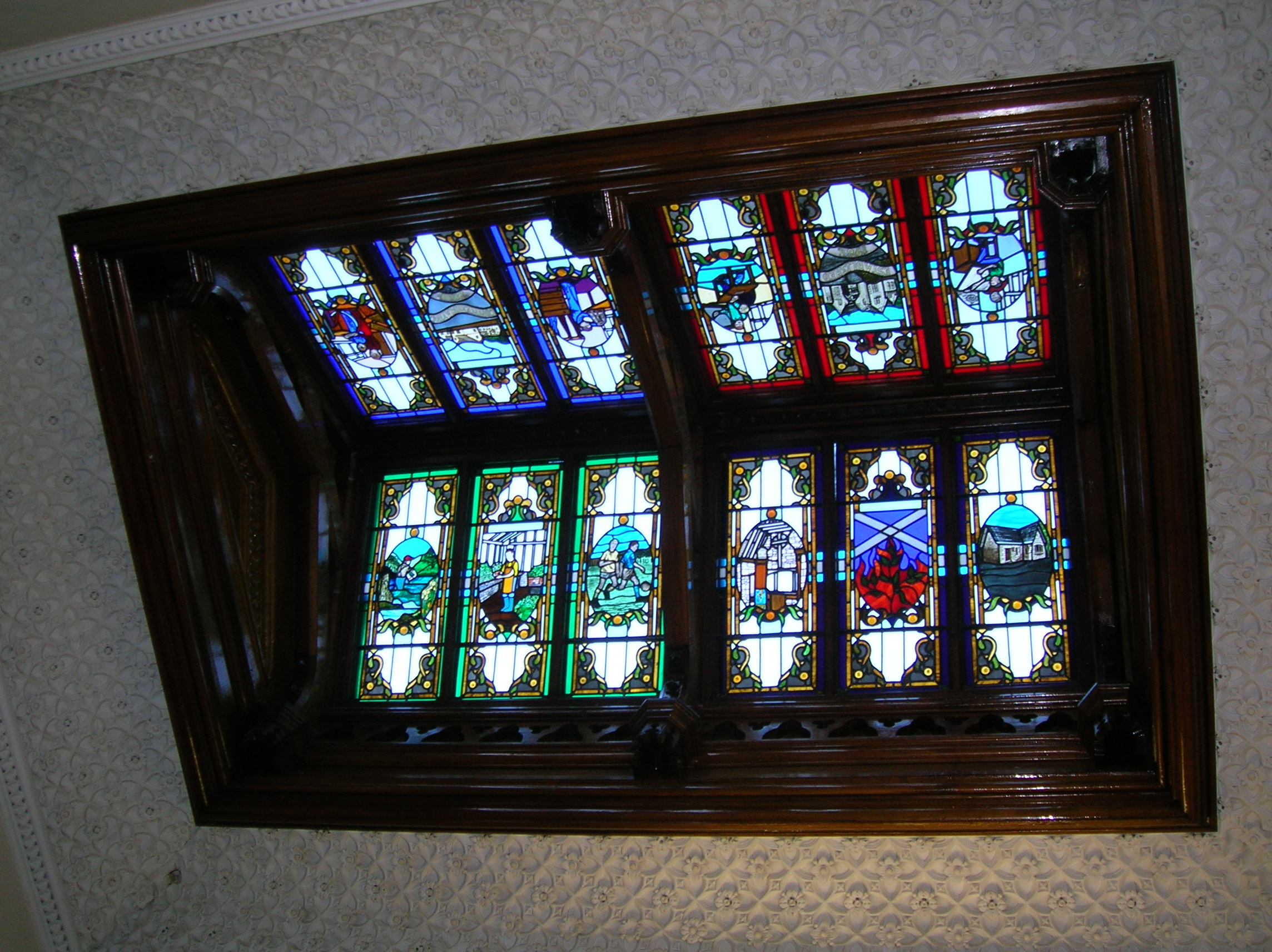
Stained glass in Geilsland House.

Geilsland House may have been designed by Robert Samson Ingram (1841-1915) of J & R S Ingram, Kilmarnock. A pair of late 19th-century Gothic semi-villas at 28 and 30 Portland Road, Kilmarnock are believed to be by Ingram and clearly possess architectural details comparable with Geilsland, in particular the entrance porch with its columned supports.

The McCombe family were the last owners before it became a Church of Scotland school and being involved in the fruit trade they built greenhouses, a walled garden, and fruit packing sheds. A Summer House existed in the grounds at this time, extensively used by Mr McCombe who suffered from ill health.

In 1963 the property came to 13 196/1000 Acres of grounds.

Lomond House within the grounds was built in a mock Gothic style in 1999 as a unit for young people with special needs.

== Geilsland School ==
The Church of Scotland established a Special School at Geilsand in 1964, the opening date being 1 July that year. Sixty boys was set as the original intake maximum and the first major task was for the staff and pupils to convert or build the necessary buildings. The sports hall was also largely constructed by the staff and pupils.

The first headteacher was Mr. A. L. 'Sandy' Munro. To commemorate the millennium and the work of the school, the stained glass windows in the hall ceiling were commissioned from Gail Muir and depict the activities taught at the school. In 2002, work was undertaken to remove some of the unsympathetic 1960s additions to the building.

Geilsland House was still part of Geilsland School until 2015, run by the Church of Scotland under its 'Crossreach' initiative. In late 2015 Geilsland House and associated buildings were sold to the Beith Development Community Trust with financial assistance from the Scottish Land Fund.

Geilsland House and School

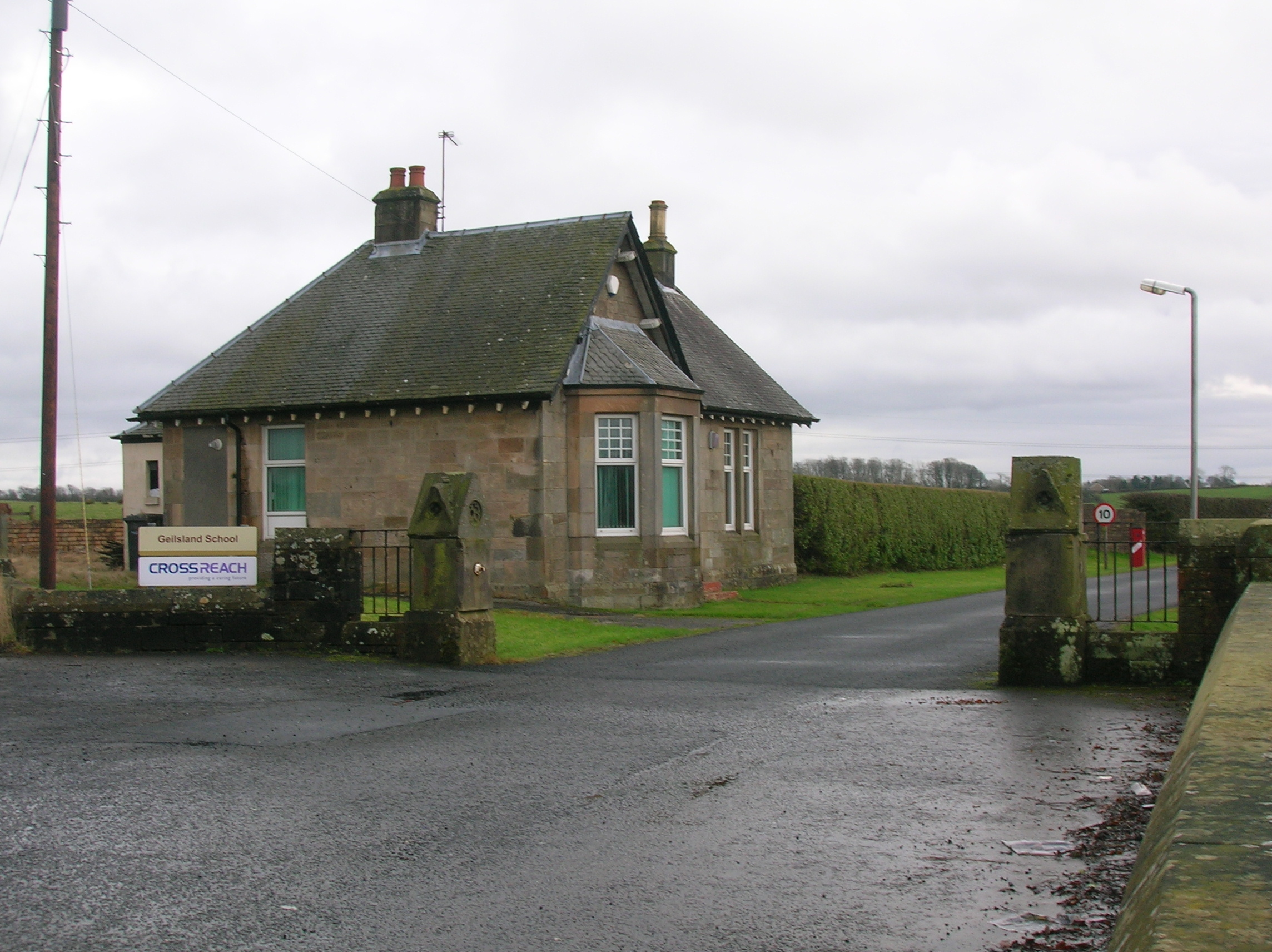
Geilsland Lodge and main entrance. In 2011 this building was set on fire by one of the pupils at Geilsland and later renovated to a modern standard.

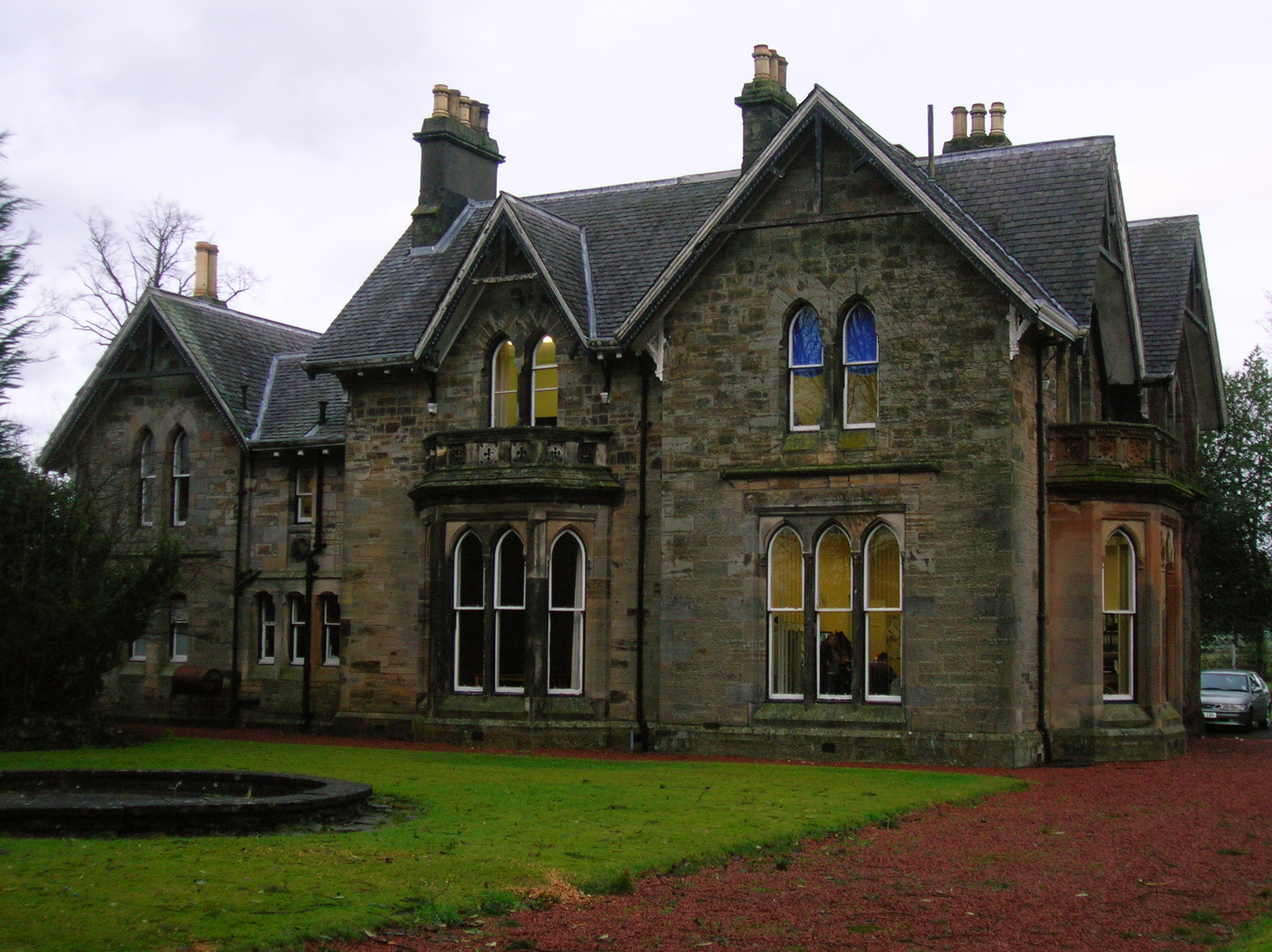
A view of the side of the house which faces Beith.

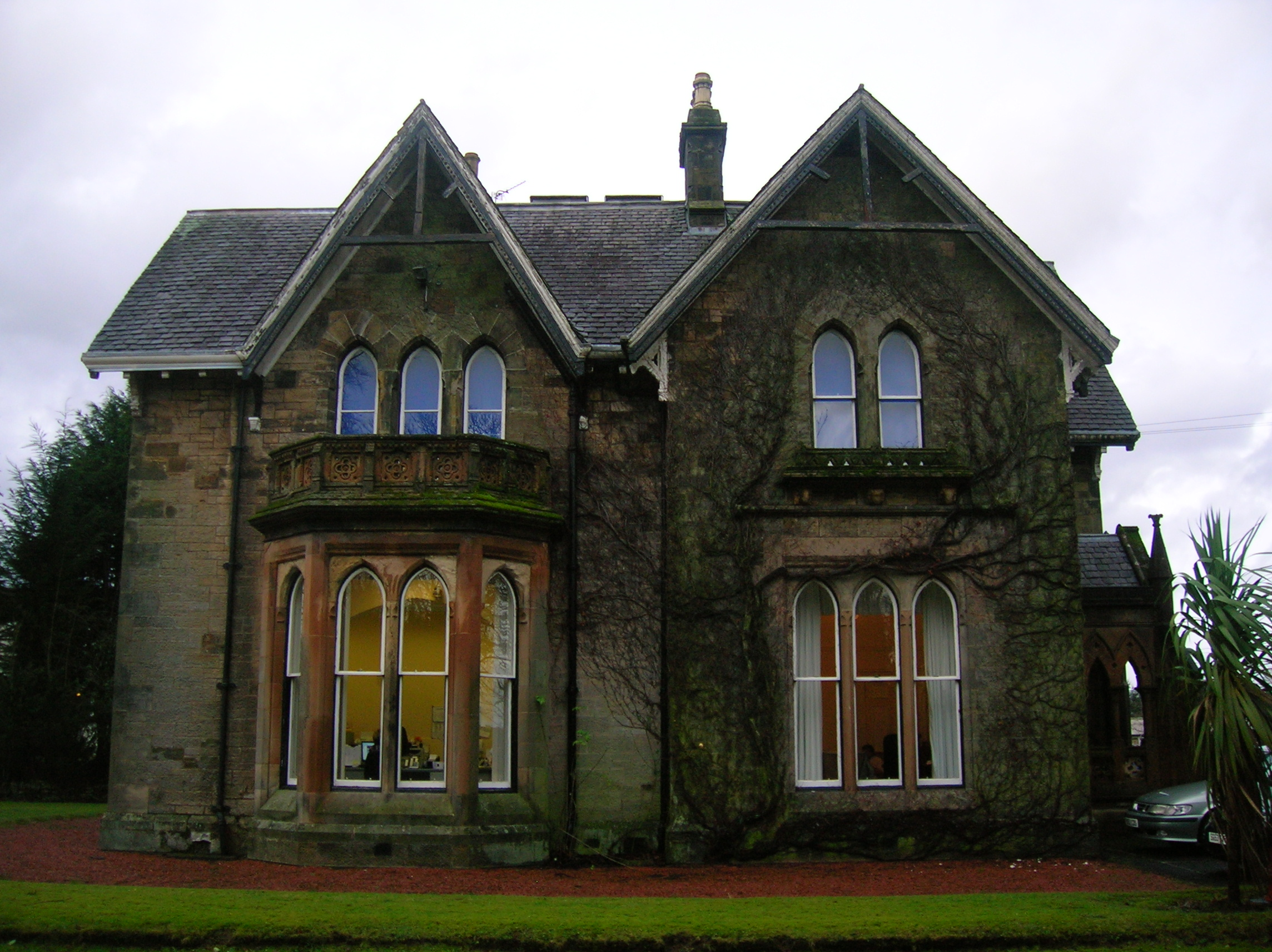
The side of the house which faces Geilsland Road and Spier's school grounds.

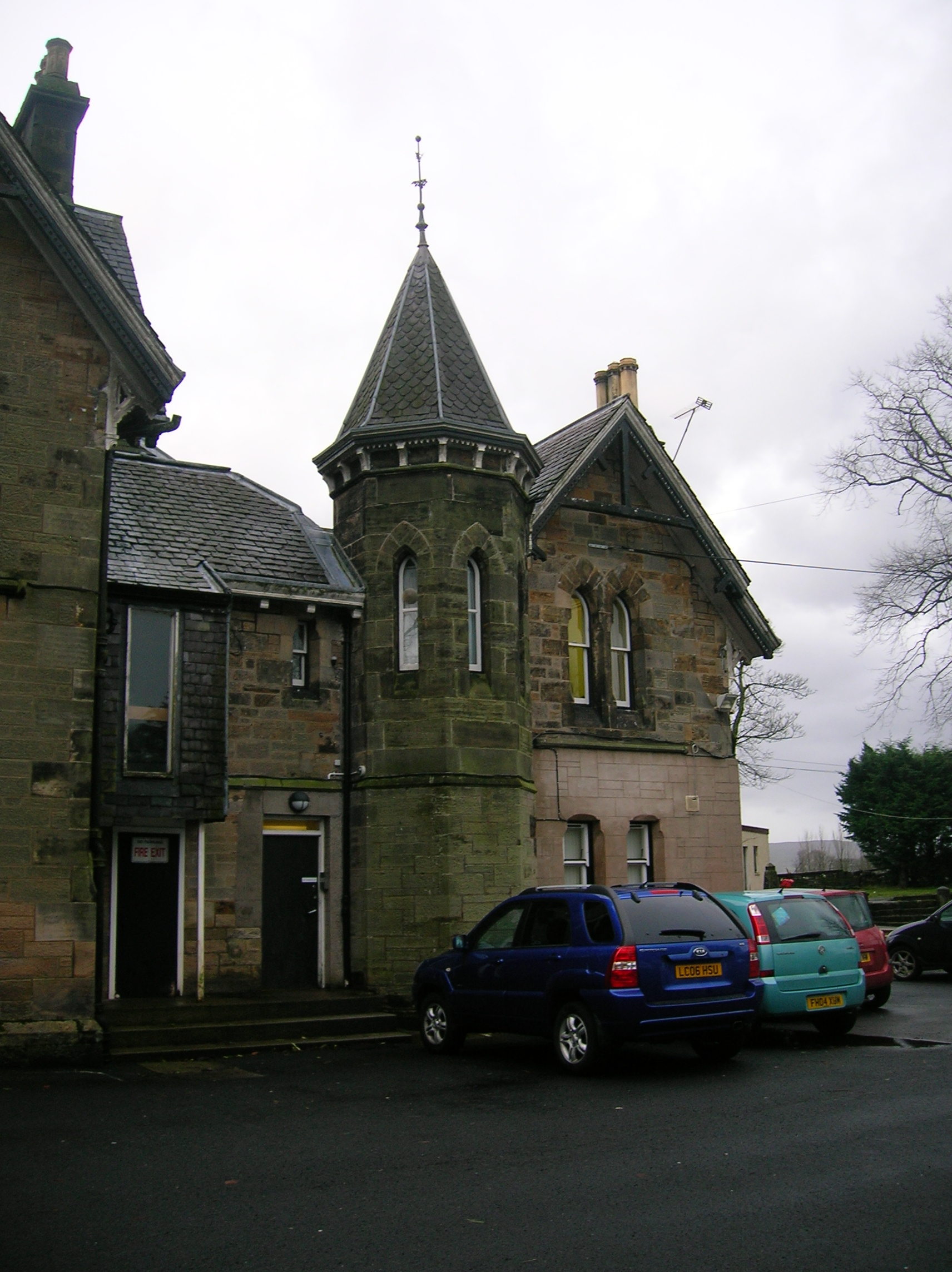
The front of Geilsland House showing later alterations.

=== The Millport Chapel ===
The Millport Chapel was opened and dedicated on 25 September 1976. It was built by the head teacher of wood craft and joiner William Jenkins with help from staff and pupils as a conversion of a stable and barn, with pews and pulpit coming from the East Church in Millport, Isle of Cumbrae. In March 1994 William Jenkins (Jenki) daughter Nicola was married in the Chapel to her husband Alastair Morrison, this was a very proud moment for Bill having built the chapel his daughter got married in. The hand made parquet flooring also made use of recycled oak from pews taken out of East Church in Millport.please note. The floor wasn’t made from recycled oak from the East Church in Millport but from recycled wood from the old desks from near by Spiers School.

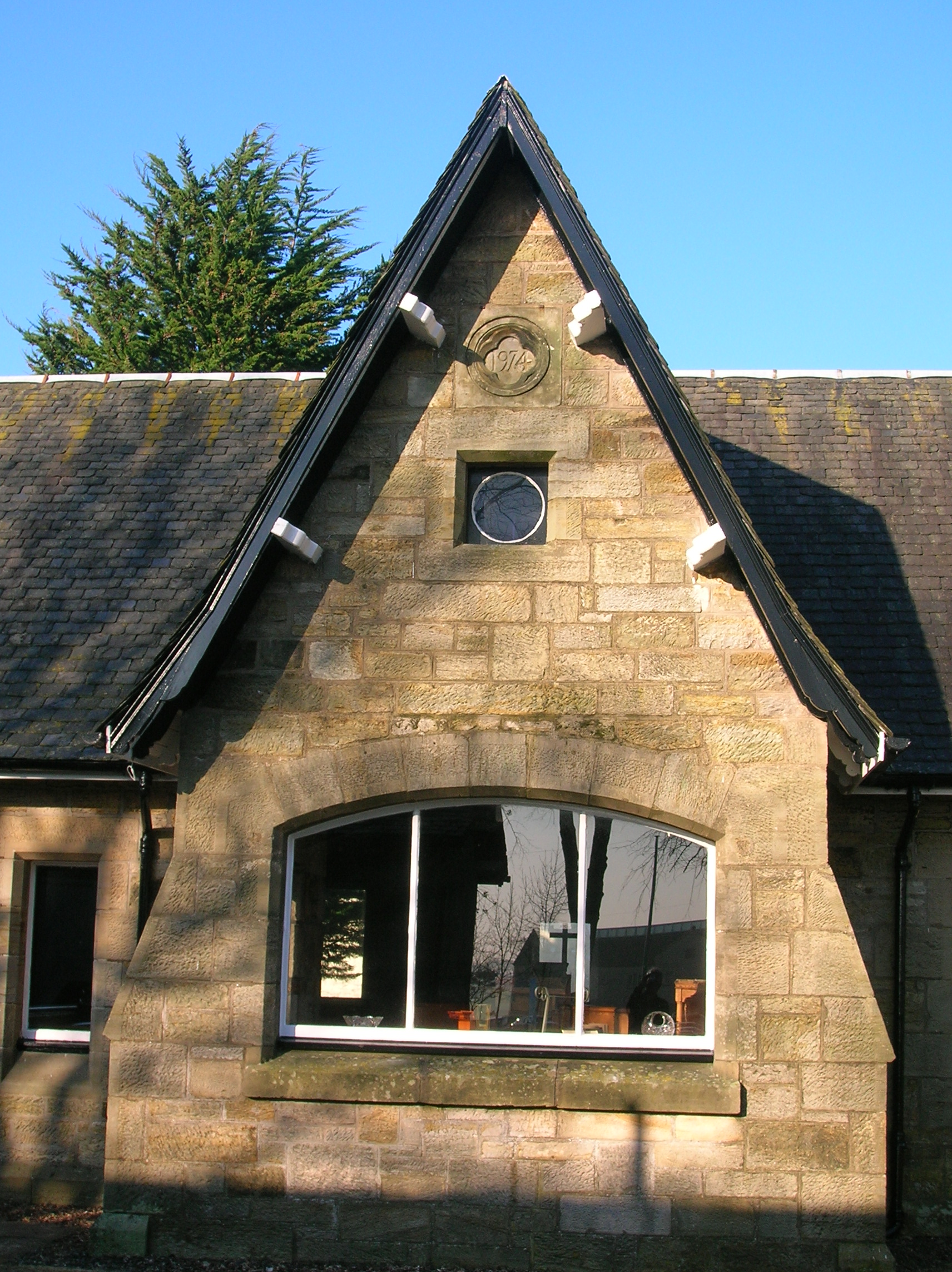
The chapel completed in 1974 - detail.

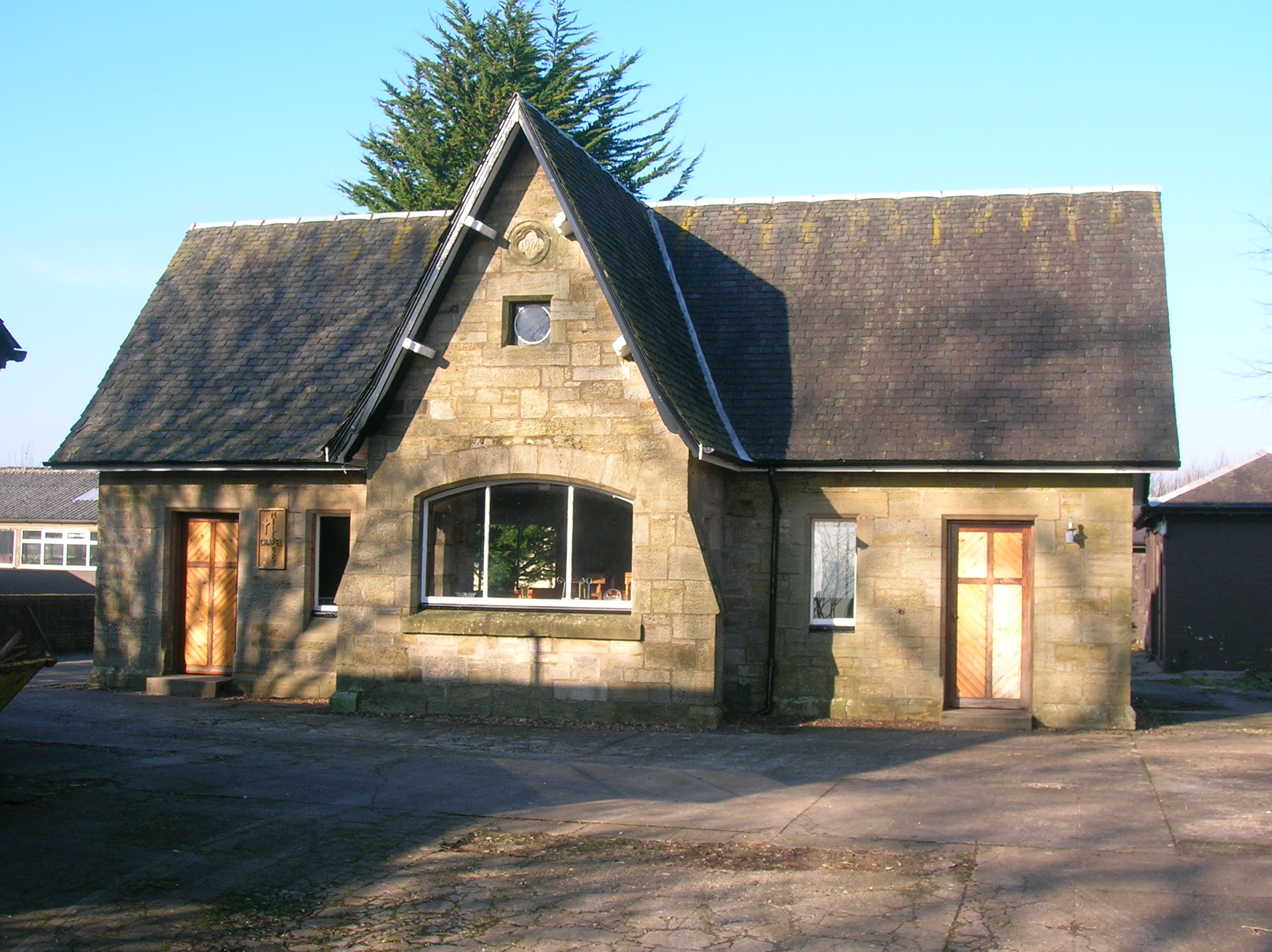
The chapel at Geilsland.

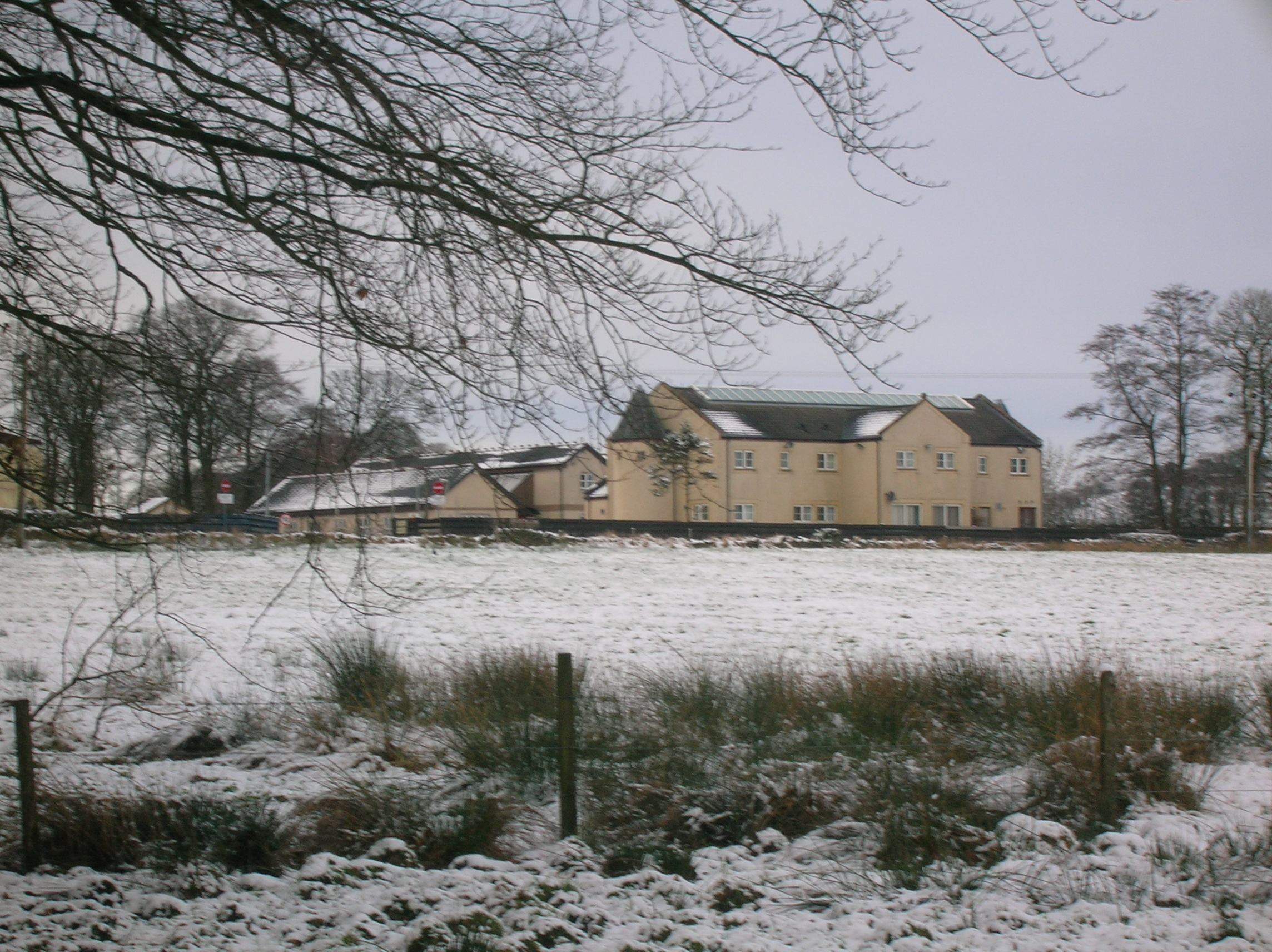
One of the accommodation blocks as seen from Spier's.

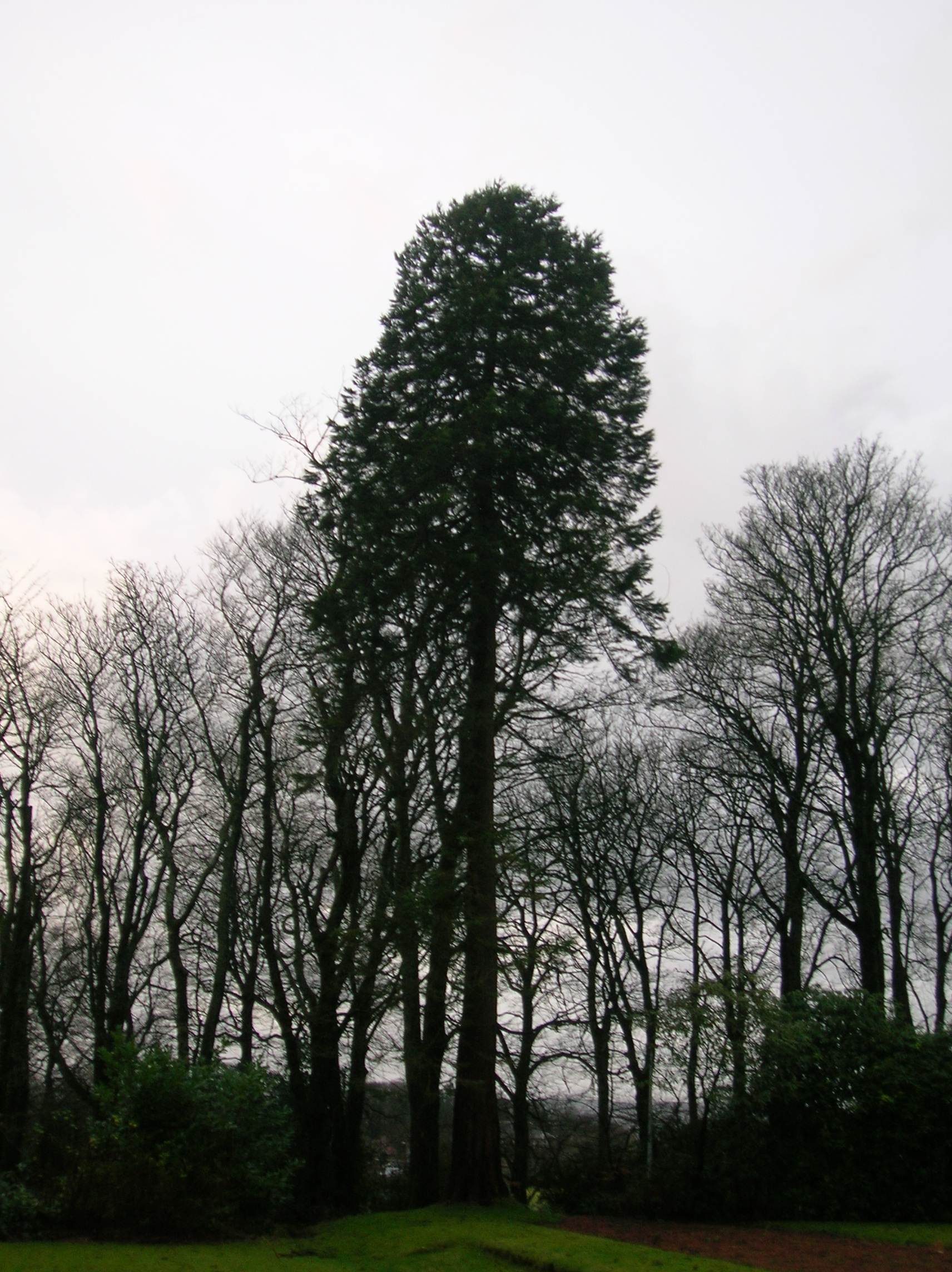
A Wellingtonia (Sequoiadendron giganteum) in the grounds of Geilsland.

== Micro-history ==
Geilsland was the subject in 1846 of an antenuptial/prenuptial agreement between Mrs Elizabeth Crawford and her husband to be, John Hallifield Spencer. This was a written contract between them, setting out the terms of possession of assets, control her late father's property and potential details of who would inherit after her death. Geilsland was to pass to her children or failing that to her sister.

== See also ==
- Spier's school
- Gateside (Garnock)
- Beith
