= Broadstone Castle =

Castle in Ayrshire, Scotland

- Barrmill, North Ayrshire, Scotland; UK grid reference NS4084831699
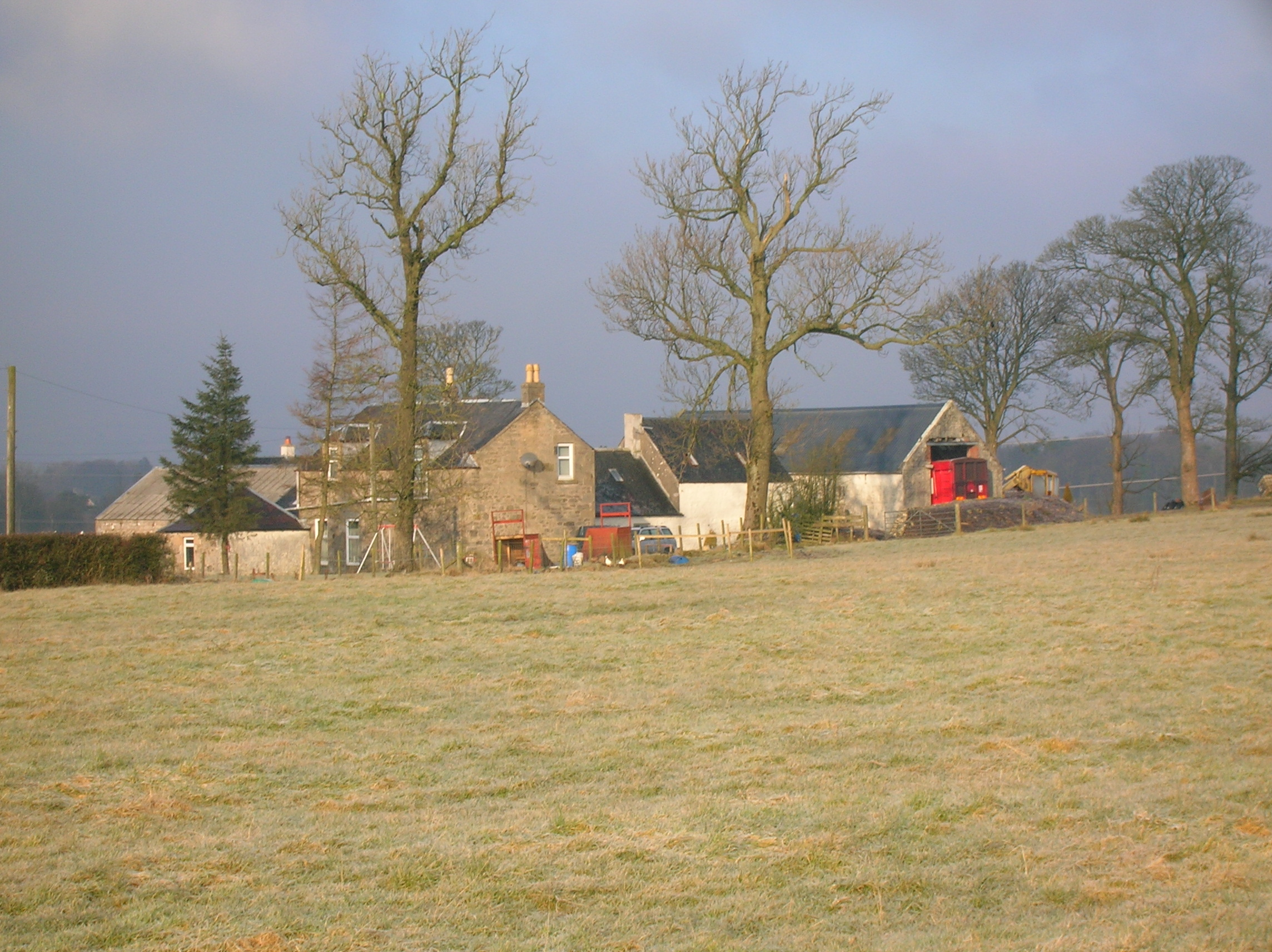
- Broadstone Hall near the site of the old castle

Site information
- Type: Tower
- Owner: Private
- Controlled by: Clan Montgomery
- Open to the public: No
- Condition: Removed

Location
- Shown within Scotland
- Coordinates: 55.7426°N 4.610883°W

Site history
- Built: 15th century
- Built by: John de Liddel
- In use: Until 18th century
- Materials: Stone

Broadstone lies close to the small village of Gateside in North Ayrshire, Scotland about half a mile east of Beith in the old Barony of Giffen.

== The history of Broadstone ==
=== The castle ===
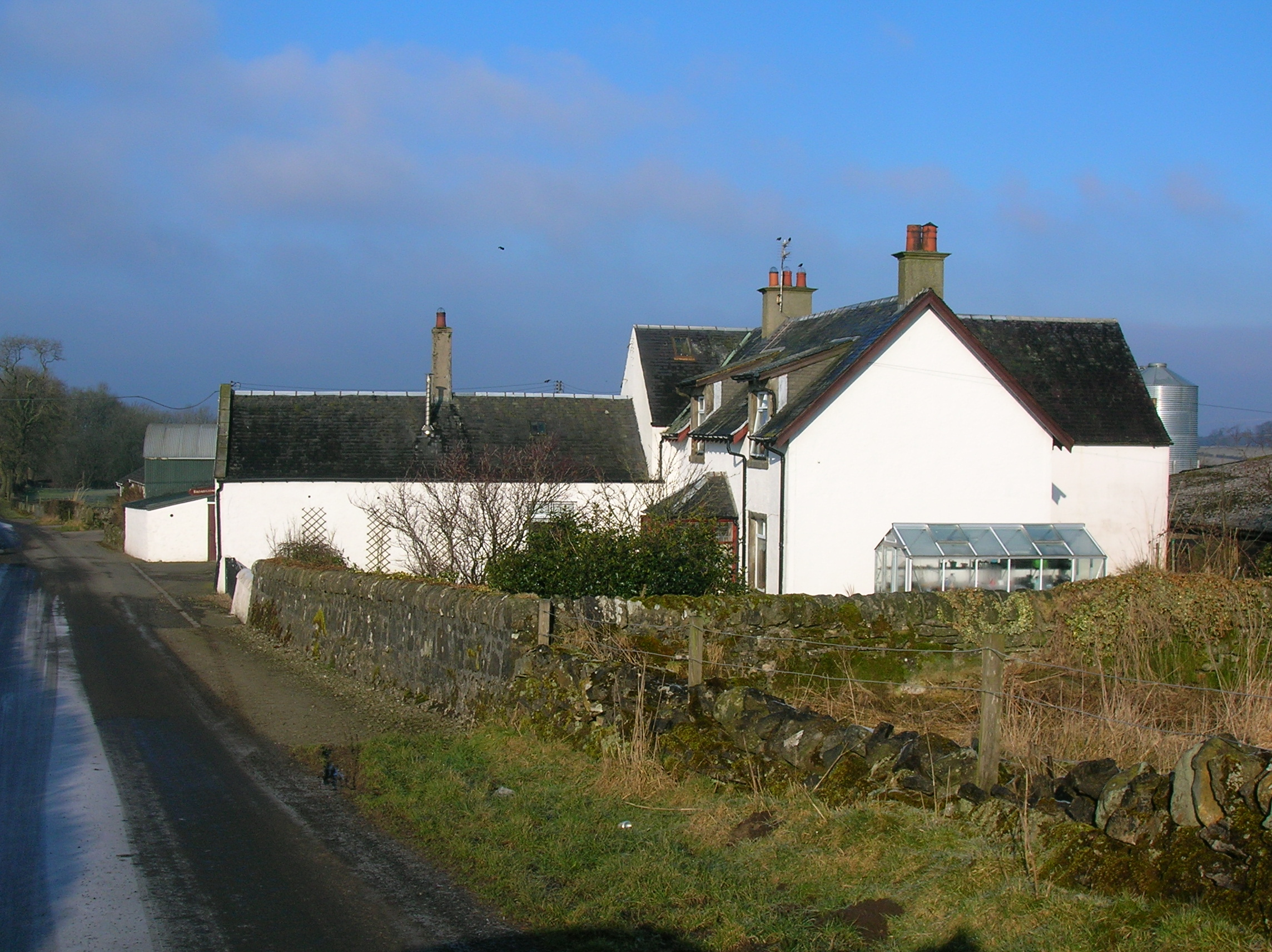
Broadstone Farm, previously known as Hillhead.

The ruins of Braidstone or Broadstone Castle (NS 362 531) remained until about 1850. but when Broadstonehall Farm buildings were being rebuilt, the castle was pulled down and its stones used in the building works; the Broadstone Crags, the site of the castle, remain however despite local quarrying. An avenue of trees and the vestiges of a garden had survived until the time of the building of the farm. Its site was pointed out by Mr W Kerr of Broadstonehall in 1855.

==== The Barony mill ====
Most baronies had a water mill which was under the control of the laird or lord and to which the tenants were thirled or obliged to go to have their grain ground into flour. A proportion of the grain was taken as payment. Thirlage ended in the late 18th century and resulted in a number of mills being abandoned once market forces took a hold. The name 'Crooked Dam' relates to a small dwelling that once existed near the Powgree Burn and the remains of a mill pond site shows that this building was originally the miller's dwelling and the old barony mill once lay below the site of the crooked dam.

== The barony and associated families ==
=== The Montgomerys ===
The Lordship of Giffen, included the Baronies of Giffen, Trearne, Hessilhead, Broadstone, Roughwood and Ramshead.

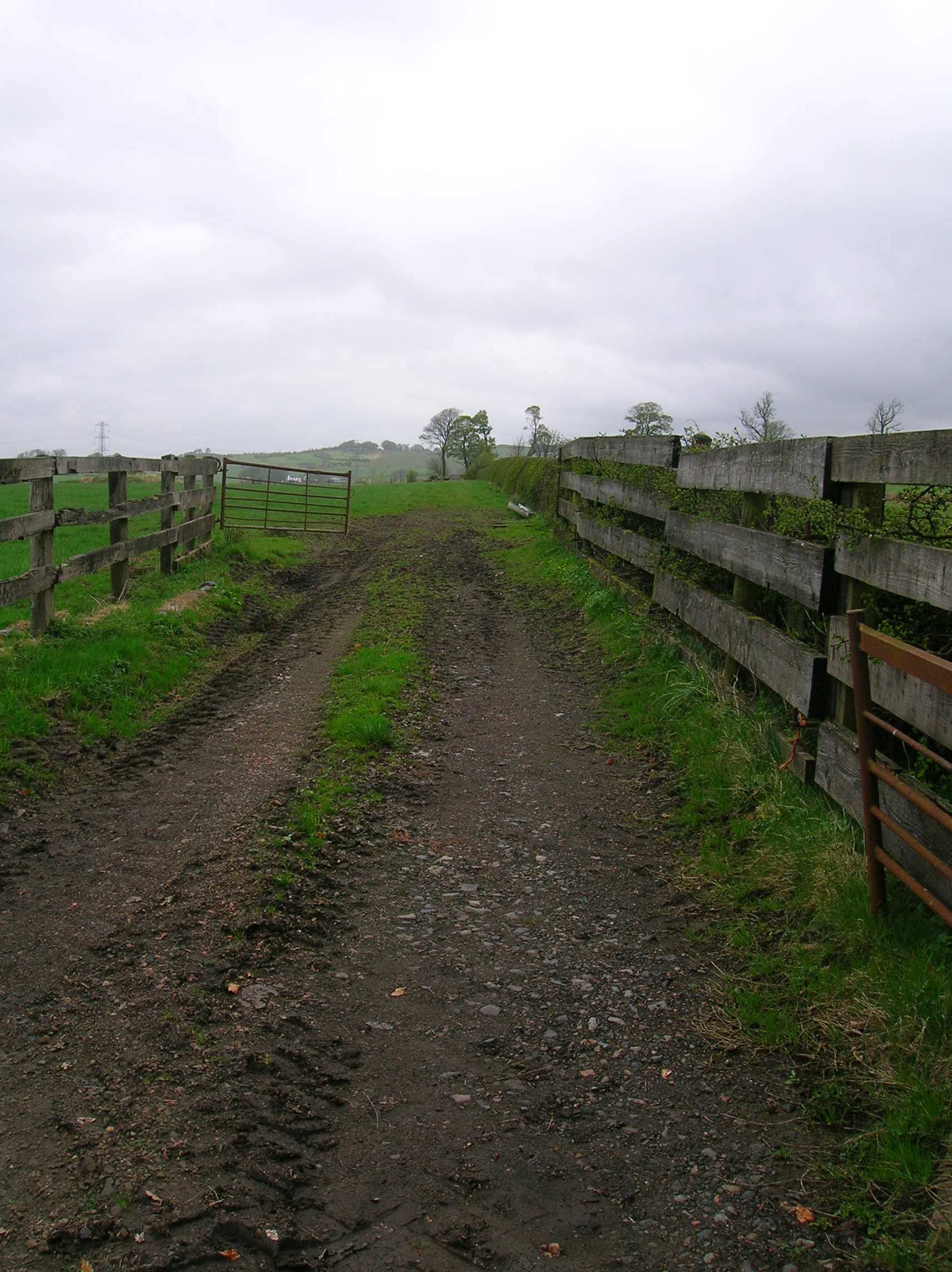
The old lane leading to the castle's site.

The Barony of Braidstone (sic) was possessed by John de Lyddale (Liddel), Dominus de Bradestane in 1452. Robert Montgomerie of Braidstone was second son of the 3rd Lord Montgomerie. Sir Hugh Montgomerie (1560–1636) was born here in 1560, son of Adam, 5th Laird of Braidstane. He married the daughter of John Montgomery of Hessilhead, and before 1568 he purchased lands from Hugh, third Earl of Eglinton. He left a daughter, Janet, who married Troilus, the second son of Adam Montgomery of Giffen. Andrew Nevin inherited the Monkredding estate in 1581 and married Janet, daughter of Adam Montgomery, IV laird of Broadstone Castle. Matthew Montgomerie was a resident at Broadstone, but was recorded as living at Bogstone in 1622.

Hugh, first Viscount of the Great-Ardes, granted a mortgage on the lands of Broadstone to his brother-in-law, Sir John Shaw of Greenock in 1650.

==== The Ulster connection ====
In 1603 Hugh Montgomery had accompanied King James I and VI on the journey to London to take possession of the English throne and his surviving brother George was the Dean of Norwich, becoming one of the court chaplains to King James; (George later became Bishop of Derry). These close contacts enabled him to eventually obtain a one third portion of the lands of Con O'Neill, Lord of the Claneboys, in Ulster. He entertained Con O'Neill at Broadstone and helped him to obtain a pardon for an accusation of 'waging war' against Queen Elizabeth I. Mr James Hamilton, son of the minister of Dunlop, later James Hamilton, 1st Viscount Claneboye, also obtained a one third portion of these O'Neill lands.

Hugh Montgomery brought a colony of Irish Protestants over from his Irish estates in 1600 and later a colony of Protestants from the area were taken over to the Ardes and Clandebora areas of Ireland following the putting down of an Irish revolt. Hugh was knighted in by King James in 1605, giving him precedency over his rival James Hamilton, and he was created Viscount Montgomery of the Great Ardes on 3 May 1622; he died on 25 May 1636, aged 76. The Earl of Mount Alexander was his grandson, his title deriving from his descent from the family of Alexander, Earls of Stirling.

Hugh Montgomery, 1st Viscount Montgomery (1560–1636), is known as one of the "founding fathers" of the Ulster-Scots along with James Hamilton, 1st Viscount Claneboye. Paterson, the historian, records that the 'Laird of Braidstane's Scotch Colony', established in around 1606, was responsible for the introduction of linen weaving and manufacture to the area around Lurgan in Ireland; he also built mills, the harbour of Donaghadee, and repaired Port Montgomery (now Port Patrick). Some of the family of Hugh Hammil of the nearby lands of Roughwood accompanied Hugh Montgomerie to Ireland and became established there as merchants in the Dublin area.

=== The Shaws ===
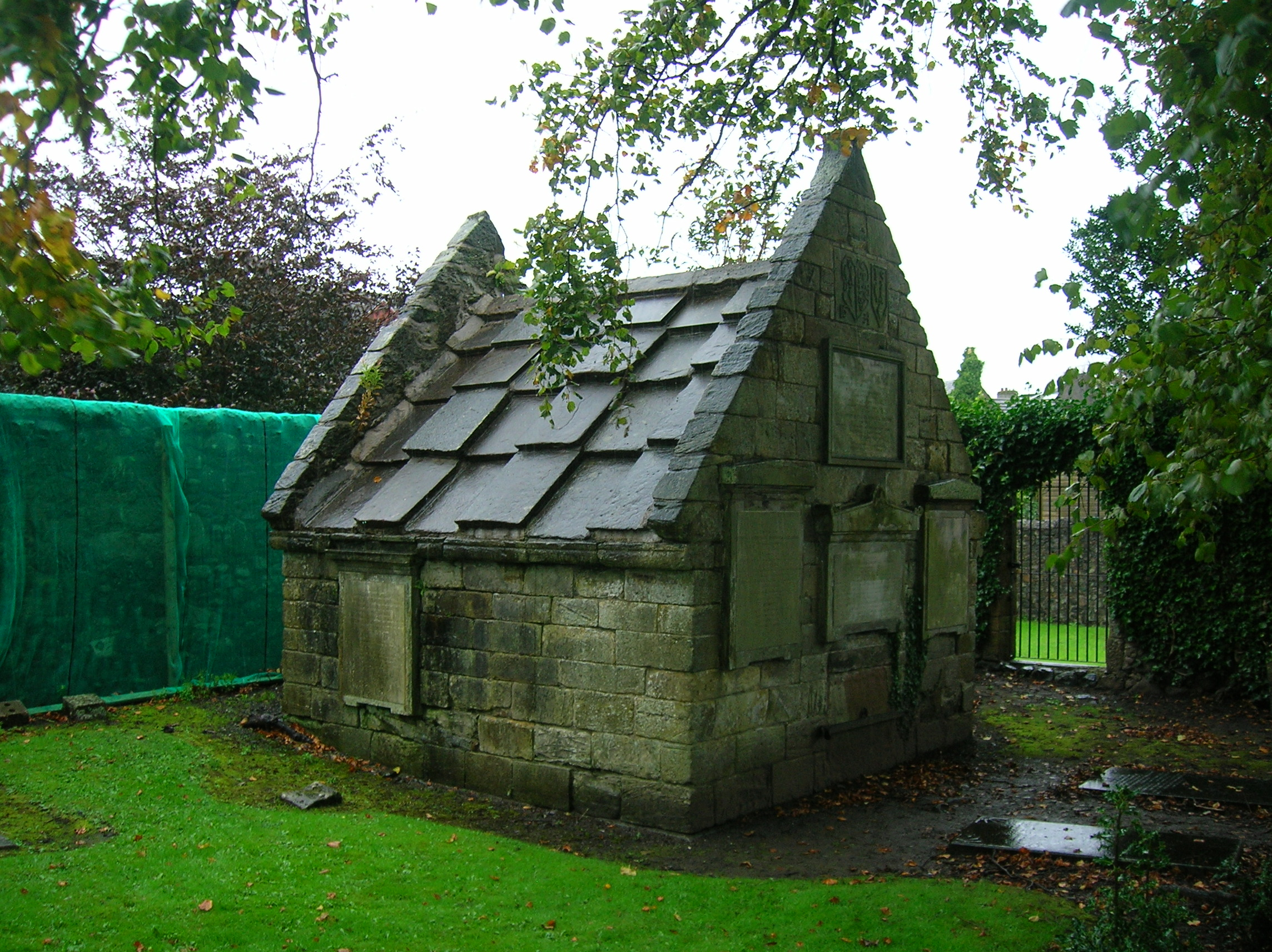
The Brisbane Aisle in the grounds of Largs Old Kirk bears an armorial device with mullets for the Shaw and annulets for the Montgomeries of Broadstone.

As stated, Hugh Montgomery granted a mortgage on the lands of Broadstone to his brother-in-law, Sir John Shaw in 1650. Sir John stayed at the castle occasionally until just after the year 1700. The Shaws gradually alienated the estate in feus until only the farm upon which the castle stood, remained. The family, from Greenock, were resident in 1650 when they purchased the estate. The castle was last occupied in the early 18th century.

The lands of Neubottle, now called Windyhouse, comprised Over and Nether Windyhouse and were feued by Sir John Shaw in 1674 to Thomas Shedden. The lands stayed with the Sheddens until James Shedden, who had two sons, one of whom, John joined the army and died in 1821, whilst the other, Thomas, emigrated to Canada.

== The Barrs ==
Robertson records a Mary Barr of Broadstone, daughter of J. Barr, who married Robert Buntine-Barr of Trearne and had a son Robert who died at sea.

=== The Stewarts ===
In 1827 and 1829 Broadstone Hall was the residence of Sir M. S. Stewart. In 1842 Sir Michael Shaw Stewart, Baronet, retained the farm, together with the superiority of the whole.

=== The Browns ===
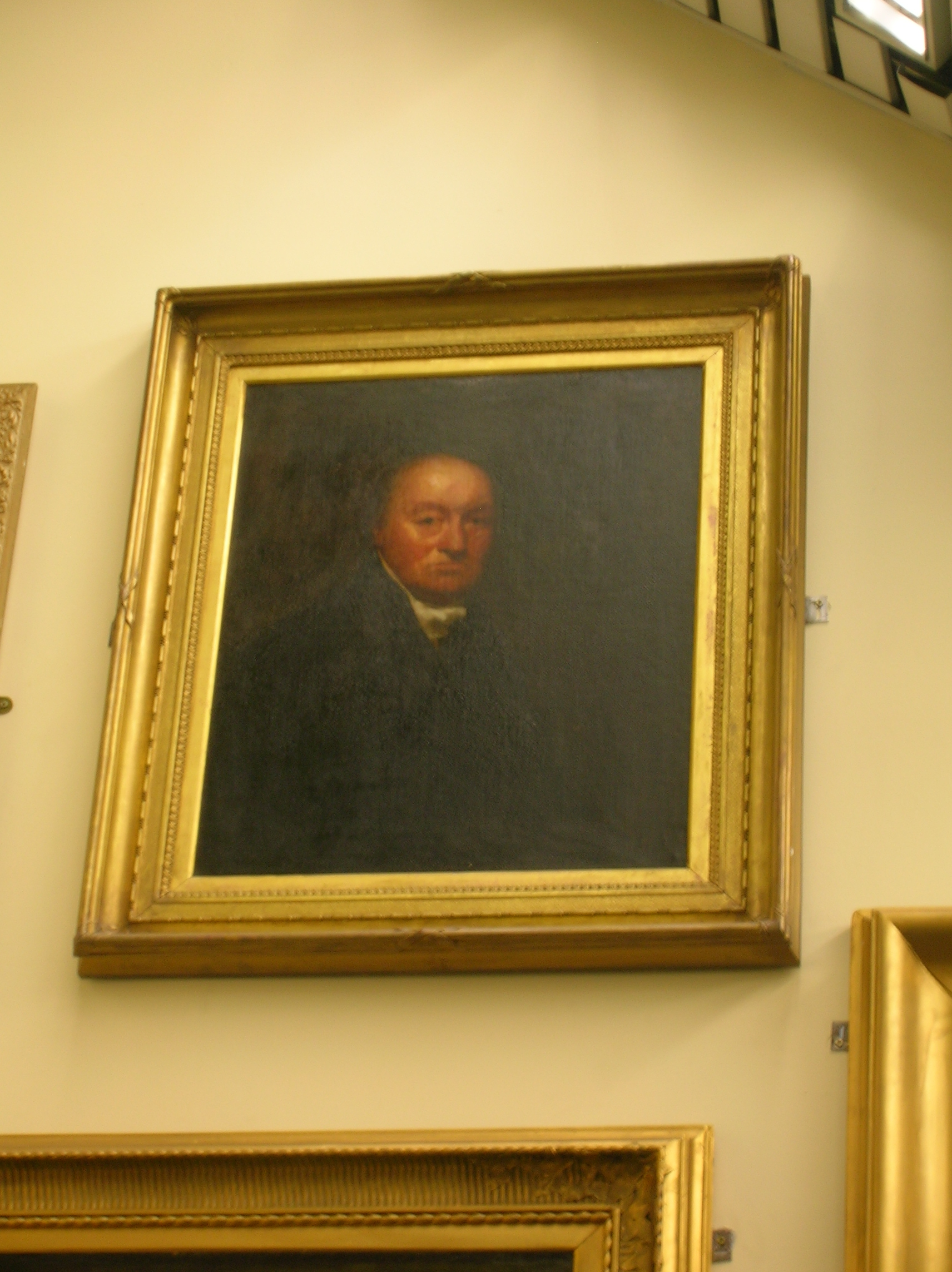
Thought to be Hugh Brown of Broadstone. Hanging in Beith Library.

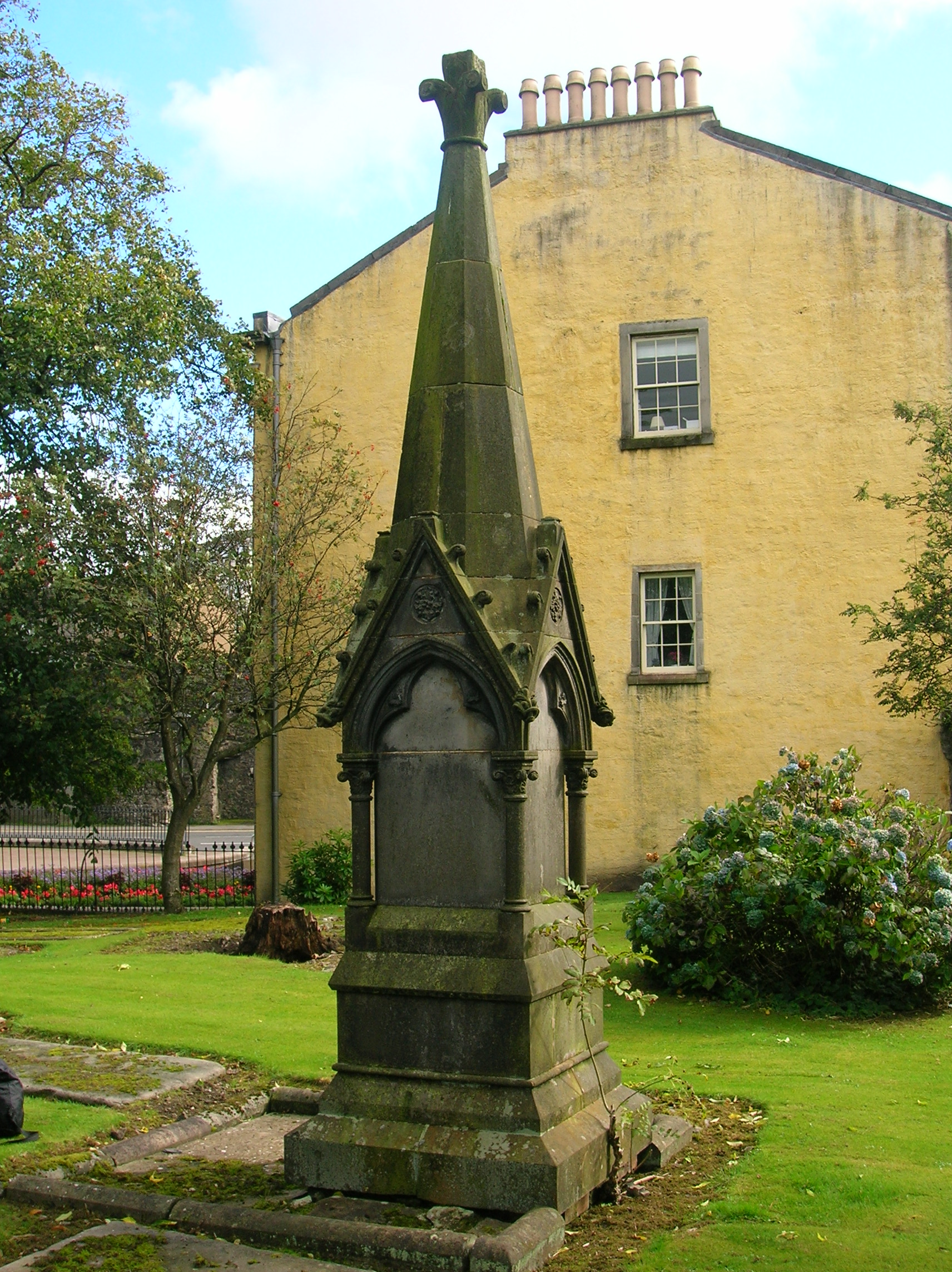
Memorial to Hugh Brown and Margaret Caldwell of Broadstone.

In 1798 Hugh Brown, a merchant in Beith, had purchased Hill of Beith Castle. He had purchased part of the Broadstone lands prior to this, as well as part of the lands of Geilsland, a portion of the lands of Crummock and part of the lands of Lyonshields in the barony of Hessilhead. He built his mansion house at Brae-head House, later known as Crummock Park. His son Hugh inherited in 1809 and another Hugh Brown of Broadstone inherited in 1857.

A memorial at Beith Auld Kirk commemorates the second Hugh Brown of Broadstone (06-04-1787 to 02-01-1857) and his wife Margaret Caldwell (17-08-1783 to 04-06-1845); Hugh Brown Esq is listed as a Justice of the Peace and a member of the Beith gentry in the 1837 Beith Directory.

Marshalland, Craig and Geilsland houses lie across the nearby Powgree Burn, together with the Spier's Old School Grounds, now a public parkland.

== Bogston House and estate ==
This was a residence of the Montgomerie family and it lay between South Barr, Hayhills and Bogfaulds Farms in what is now DM Beith. Bogston was once a well wooded estate of 100 fertile acres (0.40 km^{2}), with fine plantings, orchards and gardens. Part of the Giffen Barony, this property was feued out by the Earl of Eglinton to Robert Montgomerie in 1663. In its latter days Bogston was a farm, but following the creation of the munitions storage facility Bogston was demolished and is now only indicated by a small group of trees.

== Windyhouse Farm ==
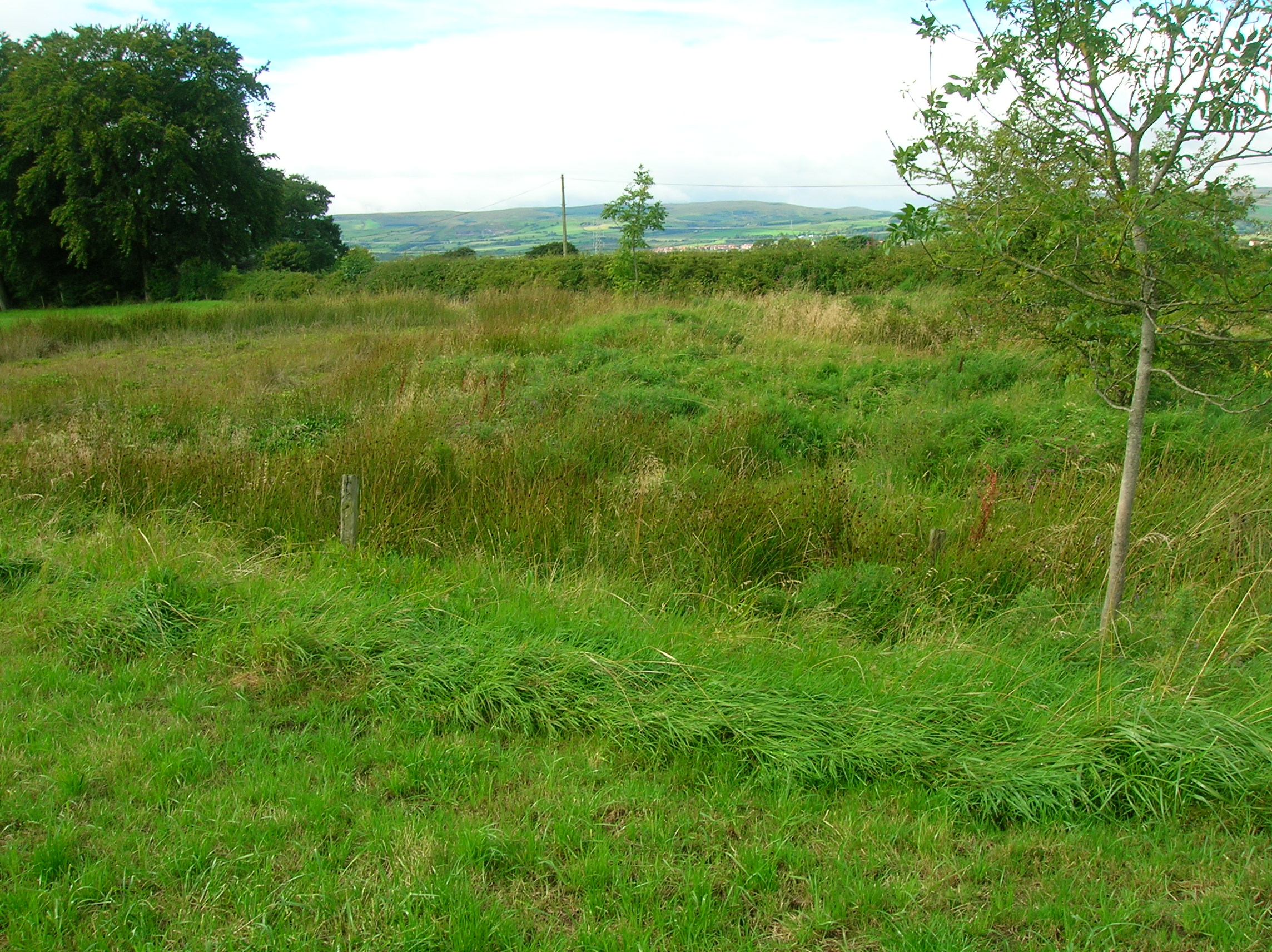
The Baney Hole near Windyhouse Farm.

Windyhouse Farm still stands at the junction of the road to Gateside and at one time another road ran past it, serving a number of farms and cottages such as Ward, Scoup, Bogfauld, Birsieknowe and Whitespot, that lay within what is now the MOD Beith base. Windyhouse had a retting pit for the preparation of flax. This required about four to six days of immersion and the waste retting water, which requires treatment to reduce harmful toxic elements before its release, is rich in chemicals and was used as a liquid fertilizer.

Close to Windyhouse was a deep pool, possibly a collapsed bell pit or limestone quarry, later used to dispose of dead animals, tree stumps, excess soil, etc; it is known as the 'Baney Hole' and is still visible as a wet area in the field. A number of small buildings existed nearby and the foundations of one are in the garden of Windyhouse, whilst another is located in the enclosure formed by hedge boundaries nearby. South Windyhouse Farm, once located next to the Hillhead Railway, no longer exists and no remains are visible.

The old names for the lands of Windyhouse was 'Neubotle' a name of English origin.

Windyhouse No.10 was an ironstone and clayband mine that was abandoned prior to October 1875.

== Quarrying, lime kilns and railways ==
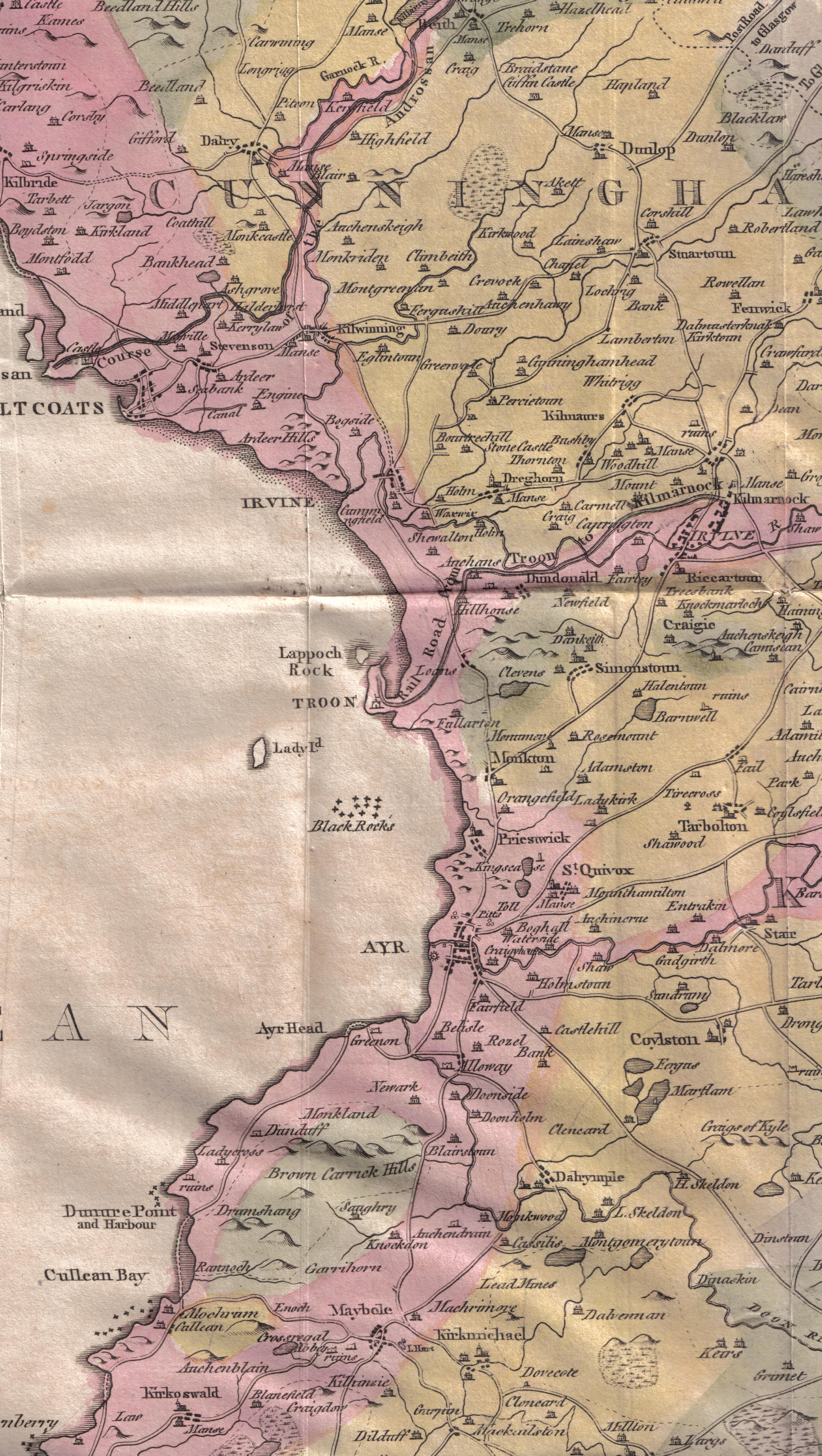
William Aiton's 1811 map showing Broadstone.

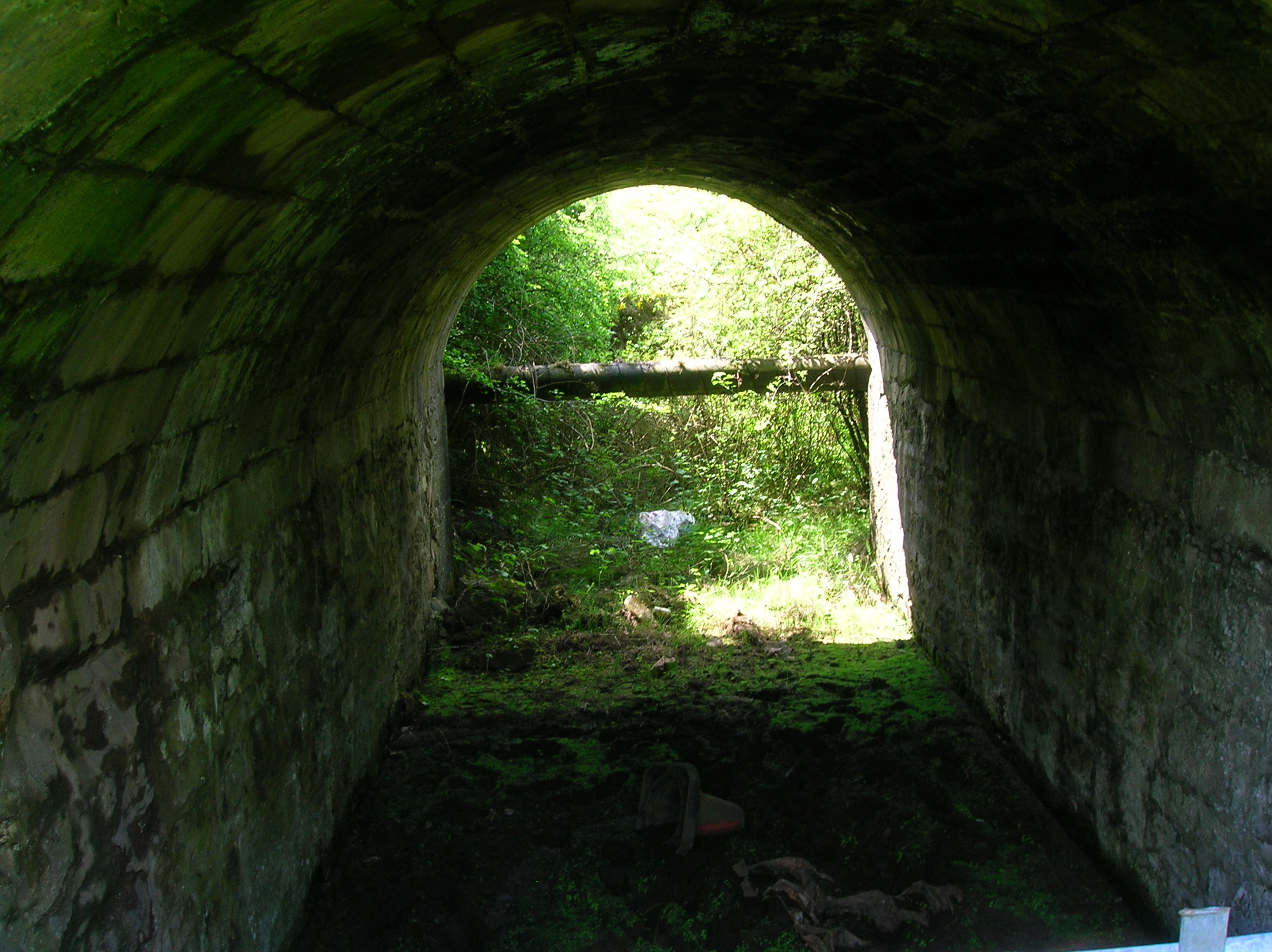
The tunnel / overbridge on the old Hillhead Railway.

Because of the underlying geology of this part of Ayrshire the presence of the many limestone quarries is to be expected. Lime kilns to produce lime for improving the soil, were a common feature of the countryside before the process became fully industrialised. Nettlehirst near Barrmill was one of the last large traditionally operated lime kilns to operate, surviving until the 1970s, however Broadstone has the substantial remains of one of the largest of the early stone built kilns. This must have created considerable pollution in the area, offset only by the employment it created. It sits right next to the limestone quarry which supplied it. The road running past is still known as 'Reek Road'.

The Ordnance Survey (OS) maps for 1858 show that the 'Hillhead Railway' ran to the quarry from Barkip Junction on the Ayrshire and Lanarkshire Railway branchline to Kilbirnie. At first sidings and a transfer system existed with a weighing machine at what was to become Brackenhills railway station, later a direct junction or transfer sidings were laid. The line did not survive into the 20th century and may have been narrow-gauge as indicated by the surviving tunnel / overbridge.

The old OS maps show that a marble quarry was located nearby, now filled in. The limestone was of such quality that it was worked as marble and was in much demand for chimney pieces.

=== Jean Deer ===
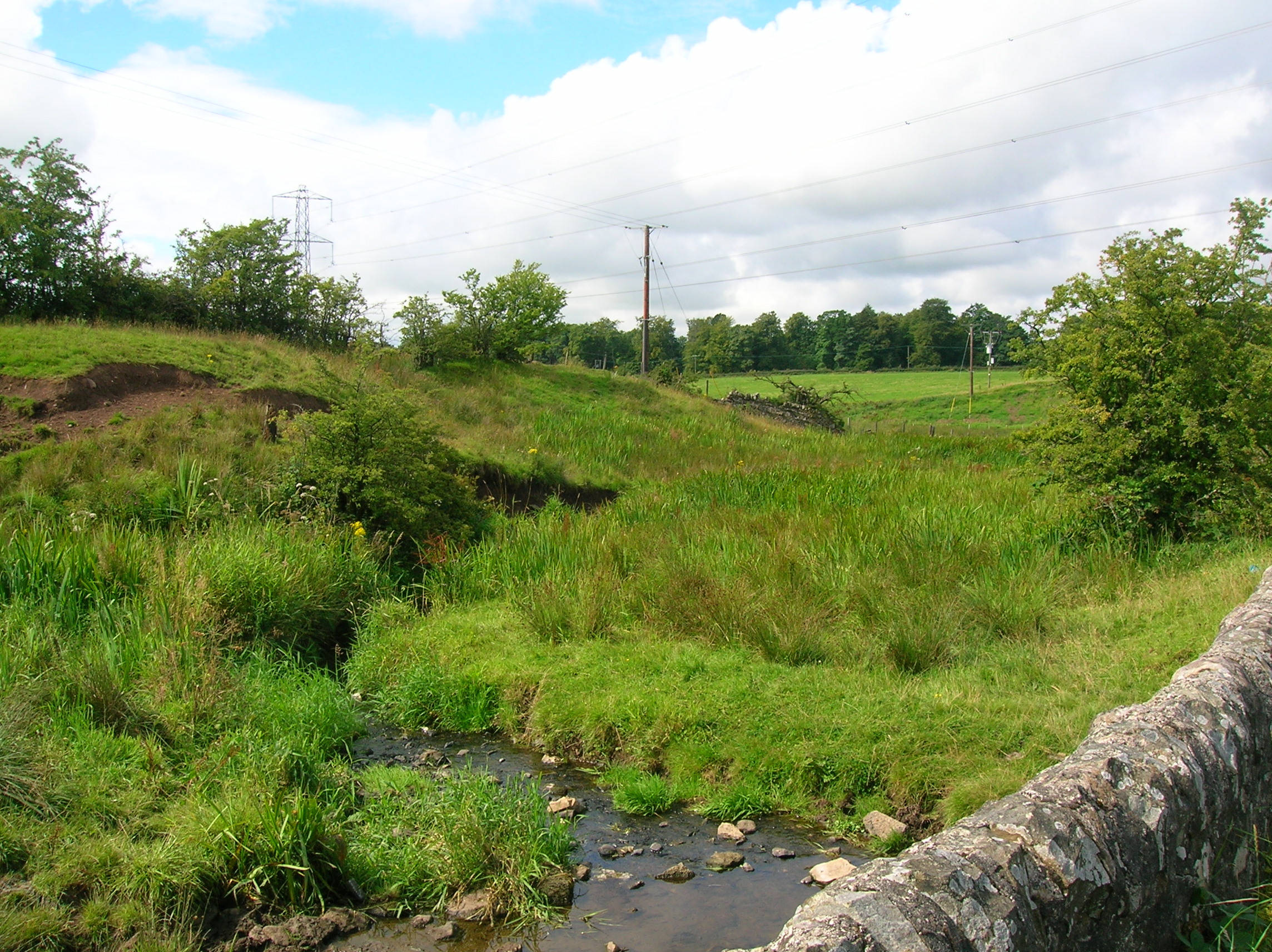
The old Crooked Dam millpond site on the Powgree Burn in the Fairy Glen.

In Service's semi-fictional novel Jean Deer's husband worked at Broadstone Quarry in the late 19th century and died there following an accident of an unrecorded nature. She was forced to leave her Broadstone home, with her two young children and her baby, as it was required for another working man and his family. Jean took refuge in a ruinous cottage on the moors near Auchenmade. The winter of 1895 was exceptionally severe and come spring David Muir and Tom Service found her dead with two of her children.

Jean's baby was found alive in the bread oven, for this determined mother was found naked, having fed all her clothes to the fire to keep her baby warm until the last possible moment. She had previously burned all the furniture and the family had so little food that they had even drunk the oil from the lamp.

The old quarry is locally known as Hennis Planting after a worker who died at the site.

The Hennis Planting and Broadstone's industrial archaeology

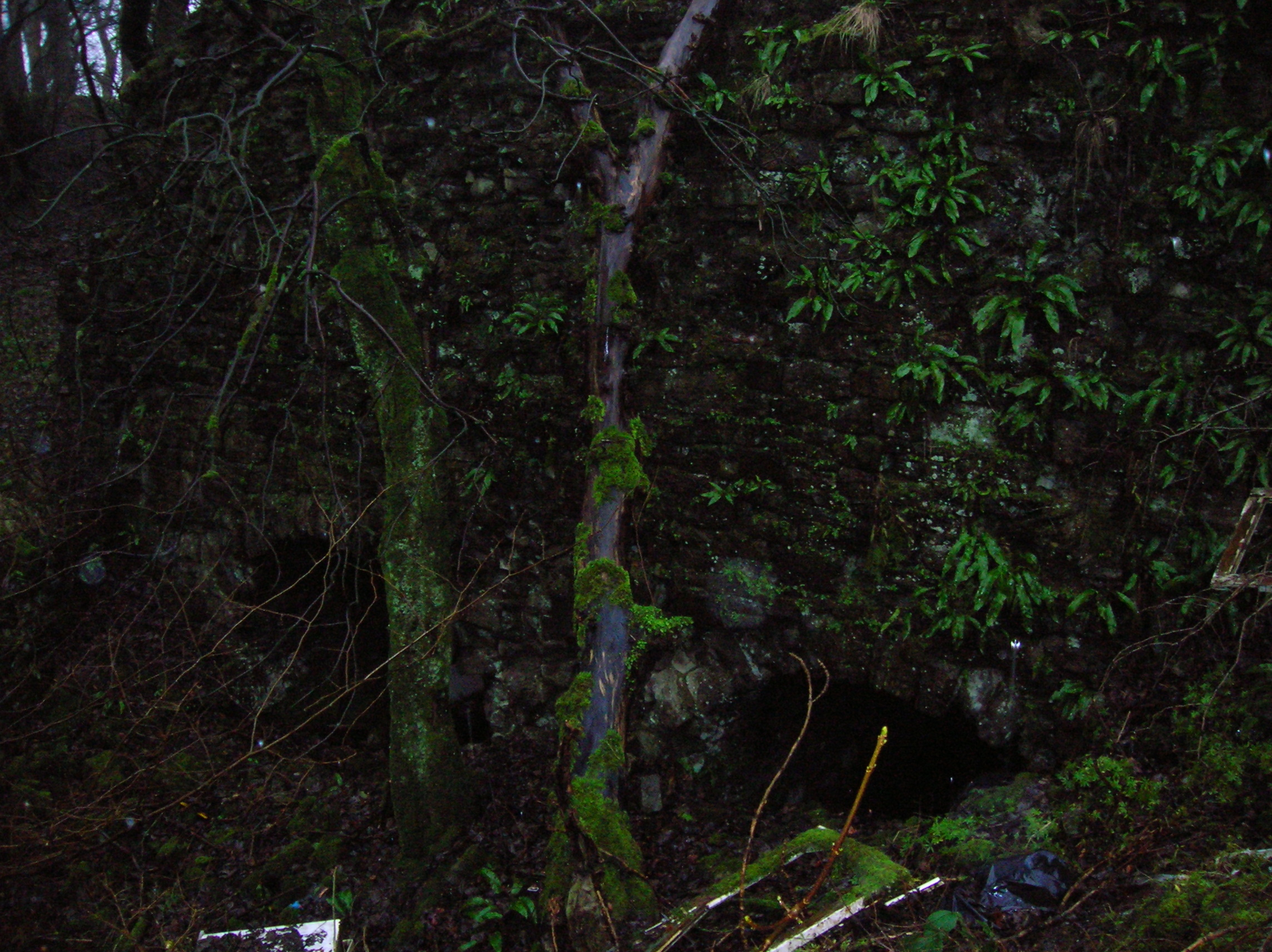
Two very large limekilns in the Hennis Planting near Broadstone Hall farm.

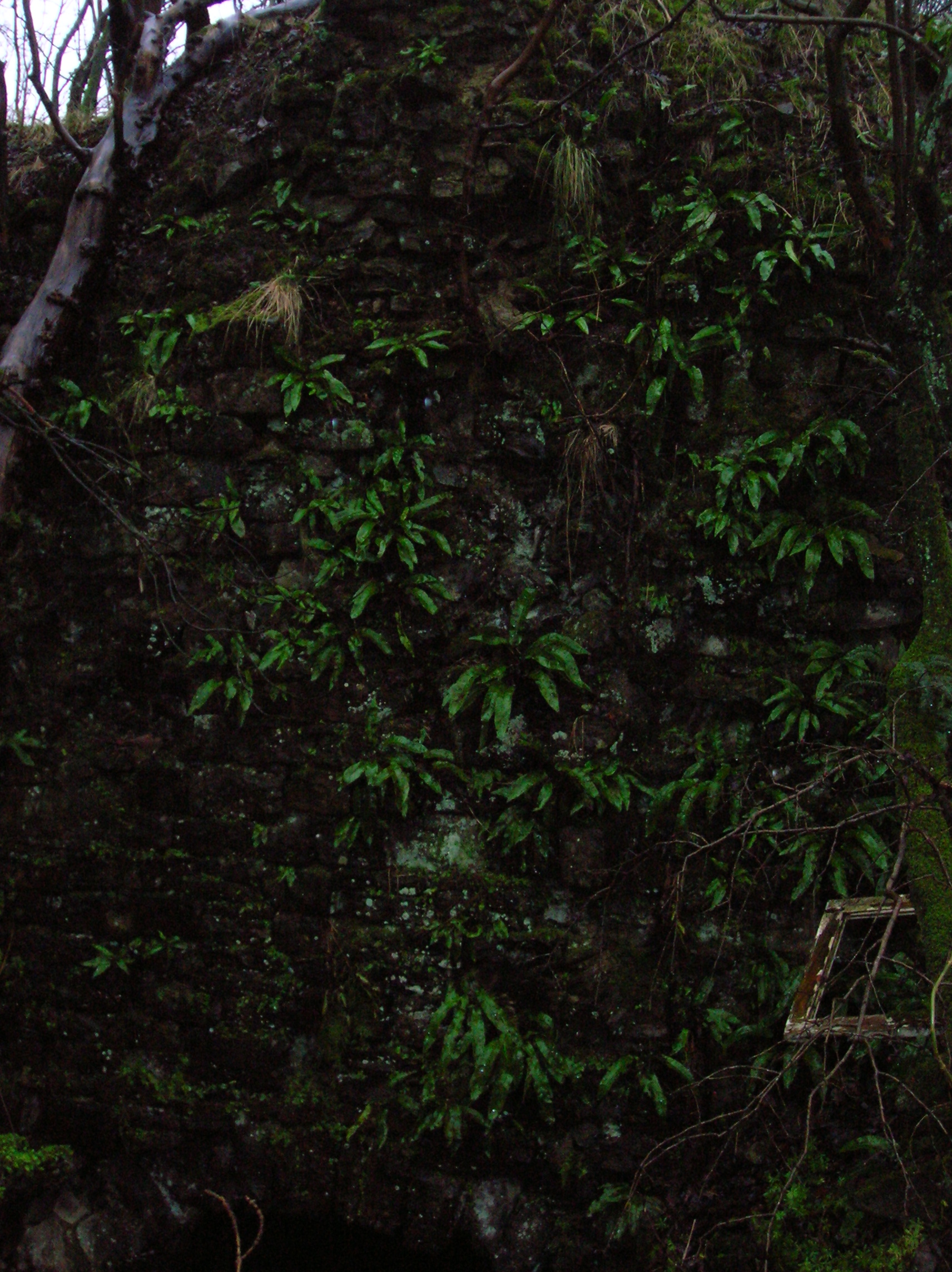
The lime kiln wall with Hart's-tongue ferns.

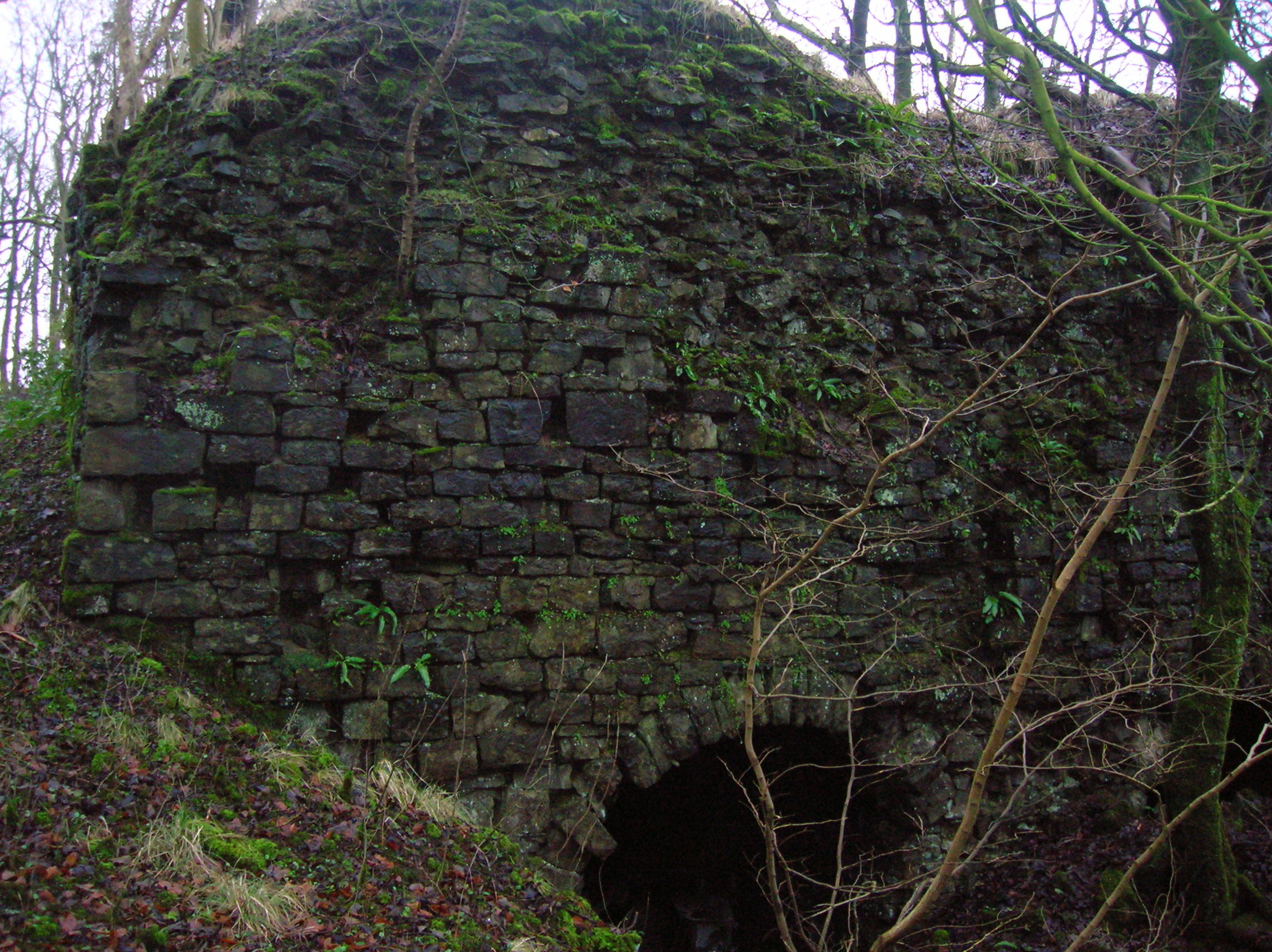
Detail of the lime kiln stonework & 'exit'.

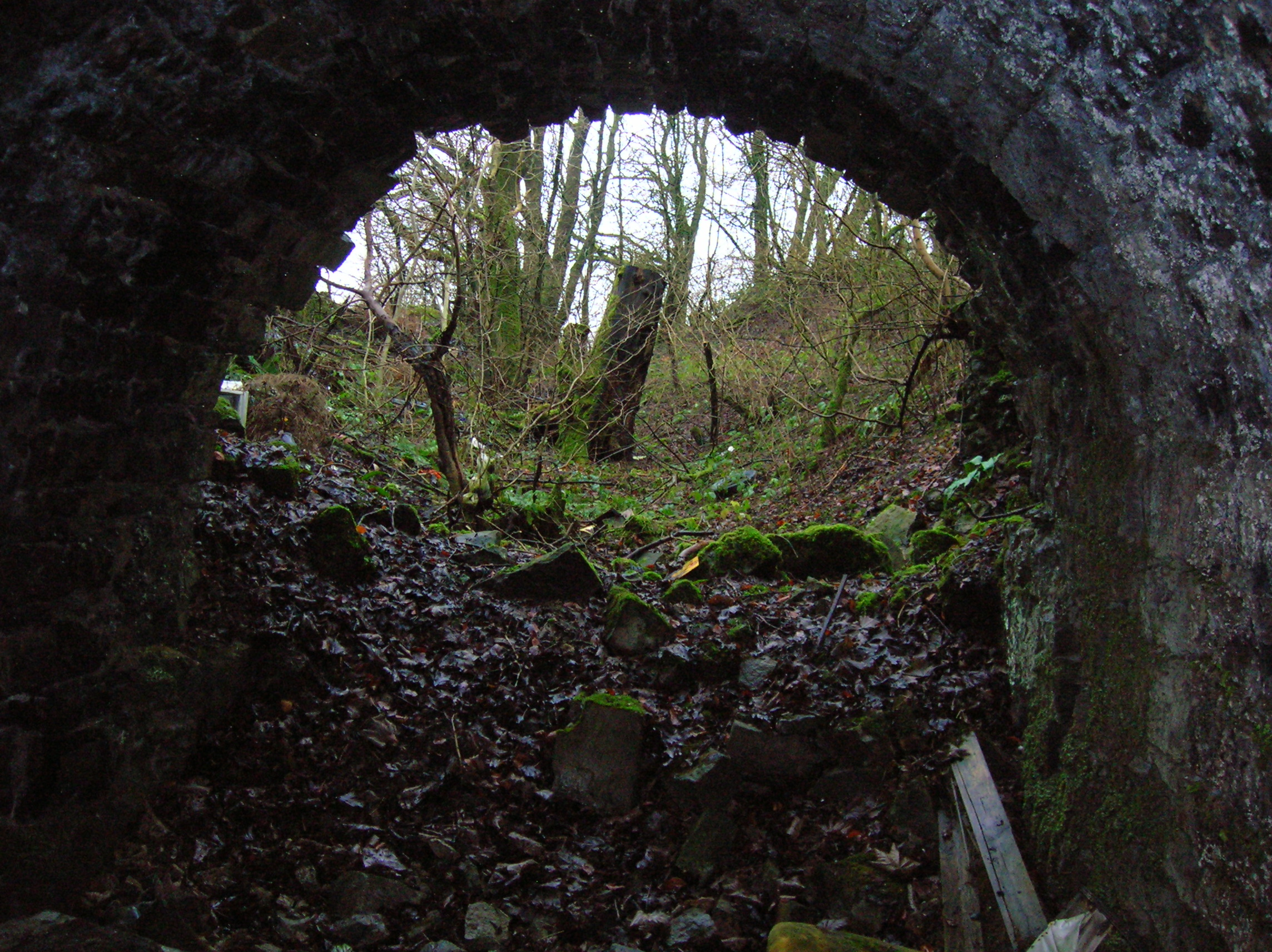
Looking out from one of the lime kiln's two lower chambers.
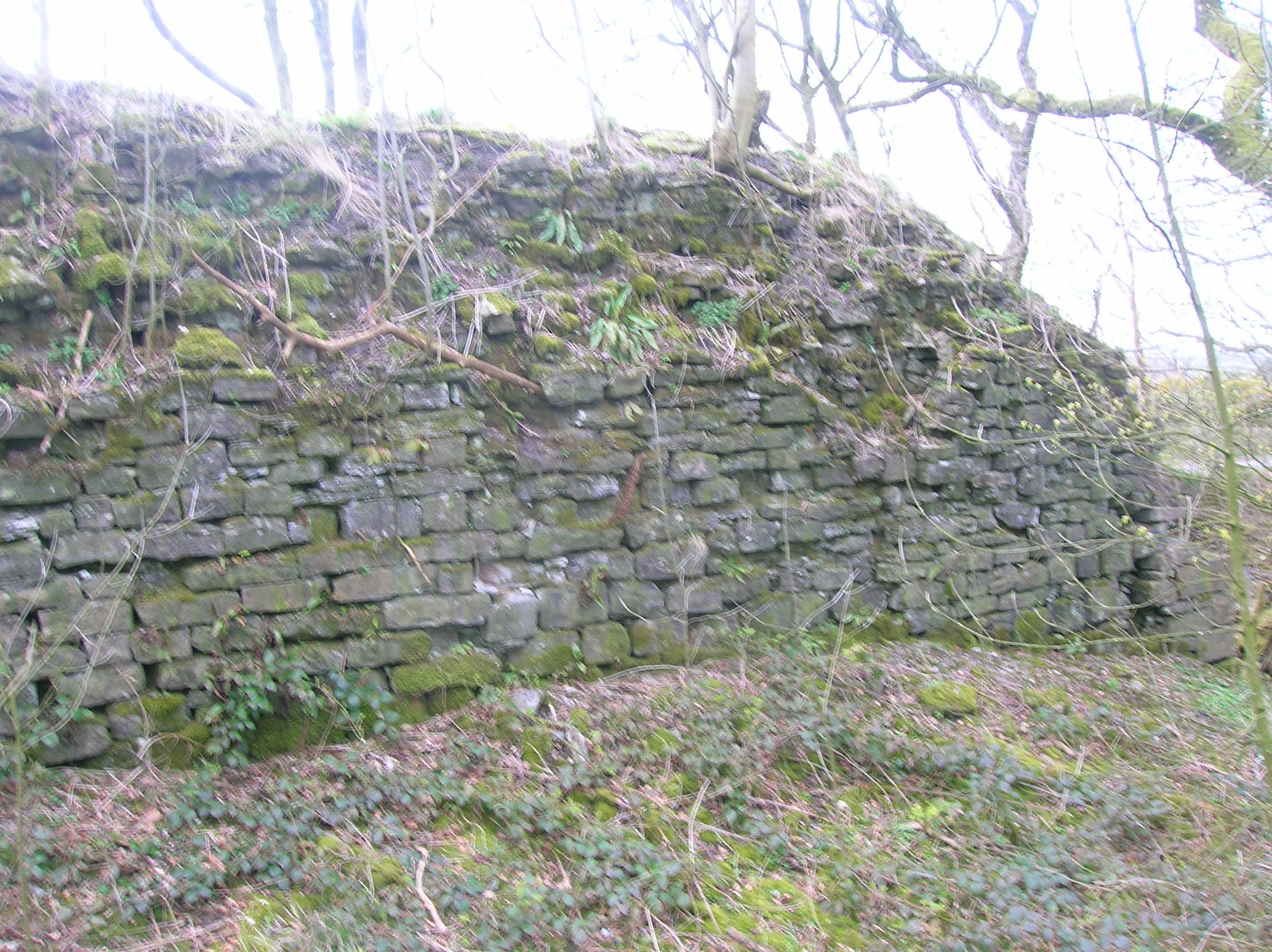
A view of the lime kiln side wall.

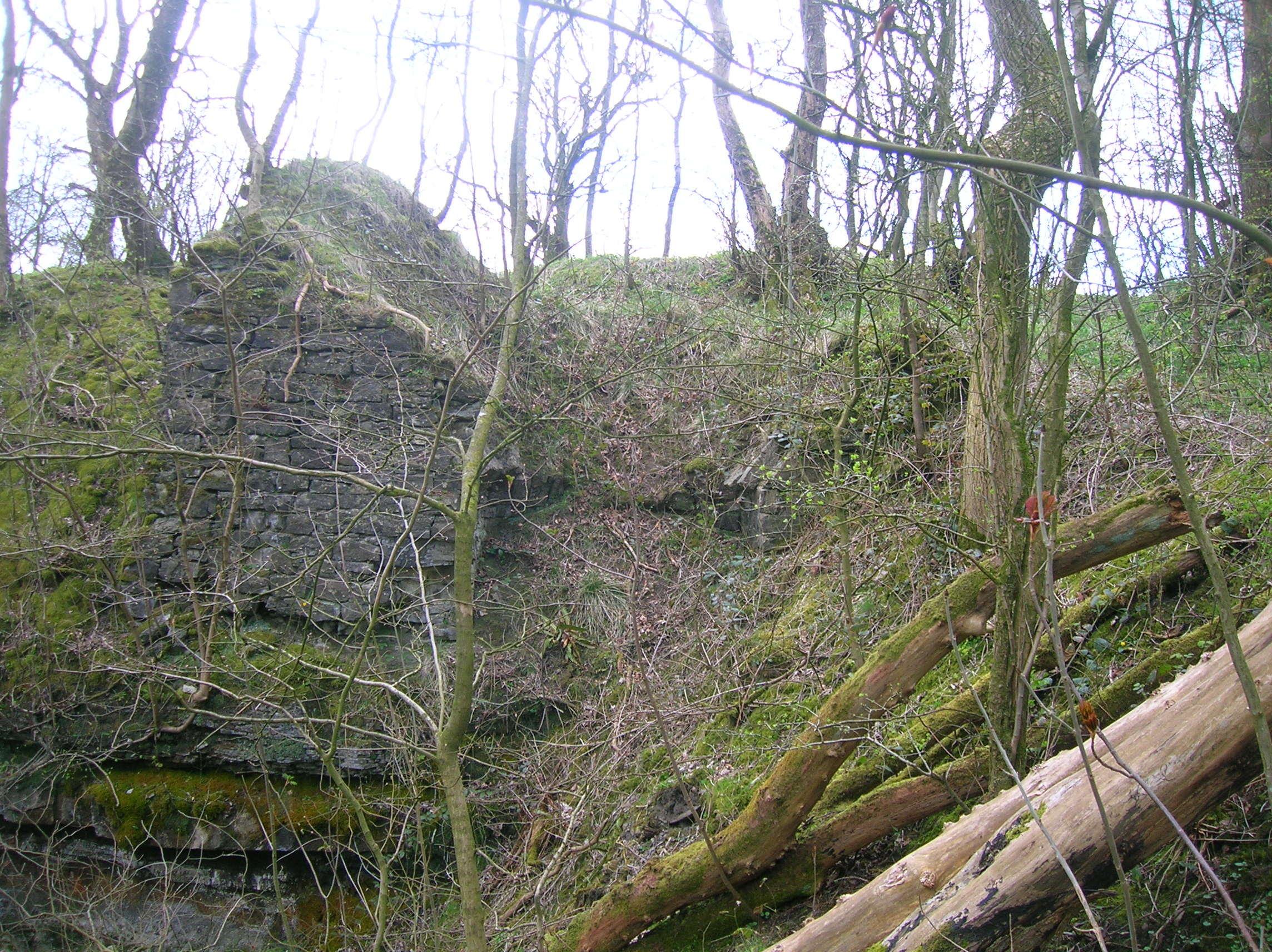
Another lime kiln which may predate the quarry beneath.

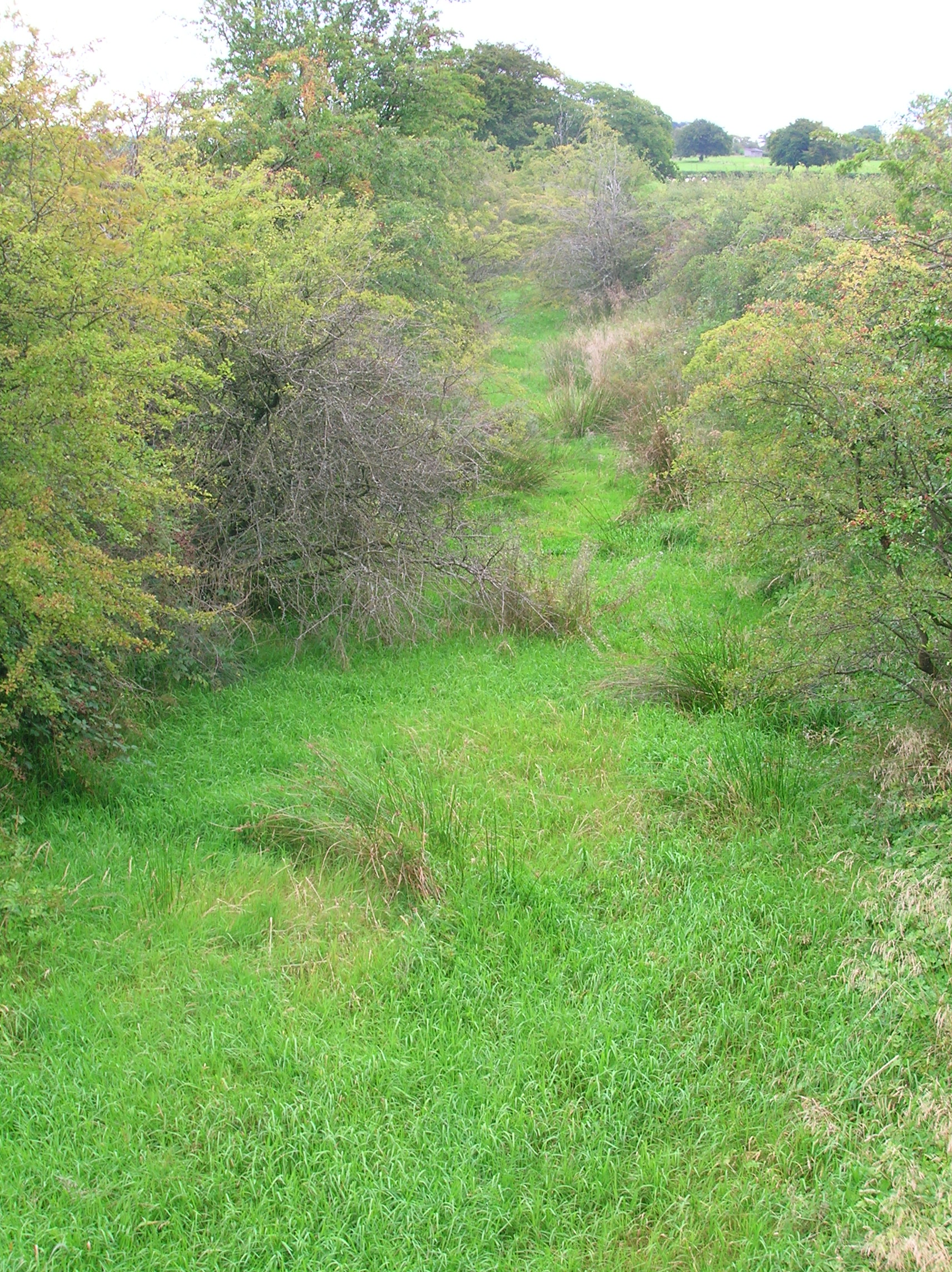
The course of the old 'Hillhead Railway' from Barkip Junction to Broadstone limestone quarry.

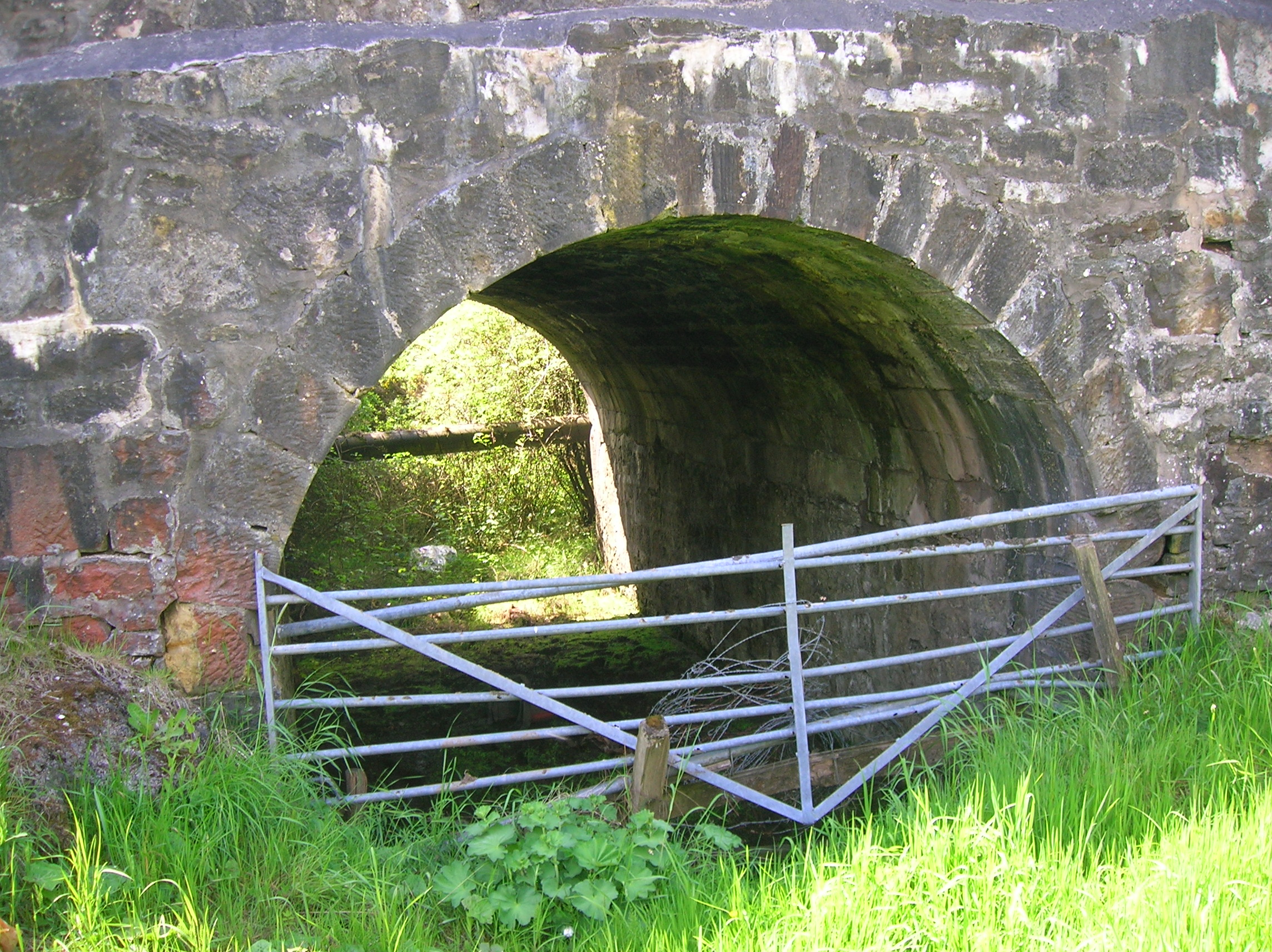
Overbridge near the old South Windyhouse Farm site.
