= Hugh Montgomerie =

Hugh Montgomerie may refer to

- Hugh Montgomerie, 1st Earl of Eglinton (c. 1460–1545)
- Hugh Montgomerie, 3rd Earl of Eglinton (died 1585)
- Hugh Montgomerie, 4th Earl of Eglinton (1563–1586), Scottish landowner
- Hugh Montgomerie, 7th Earl of Eglinton (1613–1669)
- Hugh Montgomerie, 12th Earl of Eglinton (1739–1819), amateur cellist and composer
- Hugh Montgomerie, 19th Earl of Eglinton (born 1966), Scottish peer, landowner and businessman

== See also ==
- Hugh Montgomery (disambiguation)
- Hugh of Montgomery, 2nd Earl of Shrewsbury (died 1098)
