= Hugh Montgomery, 1st Viscount Montgomery =

Irish viscount (c. 1560–1636)

Sir Hugh Montgomery, 1st Viscount Montgomery of the Great Ards (c. 1560 – 15 May 1636) was an aristocrat and a soldier, known as one of the "founding fathers" of the Ulster-Scots along with Sir James Hamilton, 1st Viscount Claneboye. Montgomery was born in Ayrshire at Broadstone Castle, near Beith. He was the son of Adam Montgomery, the 5th Laird of Braidstane, by his wife and cousin Margaret Montgomery of Hessilhead.

== Early career ==
After being educated at University of Glasgow and time spent at the royal court of France, Montgomery served as a captain of foot of a Scottish Regiment under William I of Orange during the early parts of the Eighty Years' War. He returned to Scotland upon the death of his parents in 1587. He inherited his father's title as the Laird of Braidstane and married Elizabeth Shaw, who died in 1623.

Montgomery established a relationship with King James VI. He was able to gain some influence in the king's court due to his correspondence with his brother George Montgomery, who had been named Dean of Norwich in 1602. The information contained in the correspondence was important to James as it included details on English politics.

== Montgomery–Cunningham feud ==
Montgomery became involved in the centuries-old feud between Clan Montgomery and Clan Cunningham. The feud dates to the 15th century when a Montgomery was named Bailie of Cunninghame by James II, a post the Cunninghams claimed was rightfully theirs. The 4th Earl of Eglinton was assassinated by the Cunninghams at about the time of Montgomery's return to Scotland.

Montgomery's involvement in the feud began when he took offence at something that Cunningham said. Cunningham fled to London, then to Holland, where Montgomery caught up with him and confronted him in the Inner Court of the Palace at The Hague. Combating Cunningham with a sword, Montgomery delivered what he believed to be a killing thrust, but Cunningham's belt buckle deflected the blow. Montgomery believed he had killed Cunningham and made to leave the palace. He was arrested and imprisoned at Gevangenpoort in the Binnenhof. Montgomery broke out of jail with the help of a Scottish soldier.

Montgomery received a reprimand from King James but was soon back in favour. He accompanied the king to his coronation as King of England in spring 1603 after the death of Queen Elizabeth.

== Ulster Settlement ==
Montgomery's friendship with the king was useful to him next in establishing a Settlement in Ireland in 1606 (preceding the Plantation of Ulster in 1610). Looking for an opportunity for advancement, Montgomery came into contact with the wife of Con O'Neill, a landowner in Ulster, who was imprisoned at Carrickfergus Castle for instigating rebellion against the Queen. Montgomery and Ellis O'Neill (the wife) made a deal that the O'Neills would give half of their land to him if he could free Con and secure for him a royal pardon. Montgomery sent a relative to Ireland to lead the jailbreak, which was successful.

At this point, James Hamilton interfered with the negotiations with the King, securing for himself a share of the land in question with the resultant shares being one-third each for Hamilton, Montgomery and O'Neill, who gained pardon. (Montgomery also secured for his brother George, his staunchest political ally, the title of Bishop of Derry and Raphoe.) Montgomery and Hamilton recruited Scots of many families and trades to populate their settlement. In May 1606 the first wave of settlers arrived. Montgomery settled at Newtownards and soon established a trade route between Donaghadee in Ireland and Portpatrick in Scotland.

In 1613, Montgomery, along with Hamilton, represented the settlement to the Irish House of Commons. At Donaghadee, he built a large stone quay to accommodate vessels ferrying between Scotland and Ireland from 1616 onwards. On 3 May 1622, Montgomery was made Viscount Montgomery.

Lord Montgomery may have been given a Scottish State funeral in Newtownards on 8 September 1636. Montgomery's coat of arms (a fleur de lis and hand above a crescent) survives today as part of the crest of Ards Borough Council, and in the school badge for Regent House Grammar School, Newtownards.

== Marriage and children ==
He married secondly Sarah Maxwell, daughter of Sir John Maxwell, 4th Lord Herries of Terregles. His sons included:

- Hugh Montgomery, 2nd Viscount Montgomery (d. 15 November 1642) of the Great Ards, eldest son and heir, who in 1623 married Lady Jean Alexander (d.1670), daughter of the 1st Earl of Stirling, by whom he had a son:
  - Hugh Montgomery, 1st Earl of Mount Alexander, an ancestor of the actress Flora Montgomery.
- Sir James Montgomery (born 1600) of Rosemount, County Down, Ireland, second son, a noted military commander. In 1649 he fled from Ireland on the approach of Oliver Cromwell and returned to Scotland, then went into exile in Holland. He married three times, his third wife being his cousin Frances St Lawrence, daughter of The 11th Baron Howth and Jane, daughter of Bishop Montgomery.

His daughters included: Isabel who married Robert Cunningham, and Katherine who married Robert Blair.

Peerage of Ireland
New creation	Viscount Montgomery; 1622–1636	Succeeded by Hugh Montgomery
