= Hugh Montgomery, 2nd Earl of Mount Alexander =

Hugh Montgomery, 2nd Earl of Mount Alexander (24 February 1651 – 12 February 1717) was an Anglo-Irish soldier and peer.

Montgomery was the son of Hugh Montgomery, 1st Earl of Mount Alexander and his first wife, Mary, daughter of Charles Moore, 2nd Viscount Moore of Drogheda. Montgomery succeeded to his father's title as Earl of Mount Alexander in 1663. His father had been encumbered by debt and Montgomery was forced to sell Newton House and much of his estate in County Down to Sir Robert Colville to raise capital.

In 1674 he received a commission as a captain of a troop of horse and in 1683 he was appointed Custos Rotulorum of County Down. In 1685 he received favours from James II of England, including an annual pension of £400 and a seat in the Privy Council of Ireland. Despite this, Montgomery adhered to William III of England following the Glorious Revolution and was appointed a colonel in William's army in January 1689. On 14 March 1689 he commanded Williamite Protestant militia forces in their defeat at the Break of Dromore. Following the battle, Montgomery fled from Ireland, first to the Isle of Man and then to London. He returned to Ireland after the defeat of the Jacobites in 1691.

From 1692, Montgomery regularly attended the Irish House of Lords and he was reappointed to the Privy Council in 1693. Between 1698 and 1705 he was Master-General of the Irish Board of Ordnance. He was made a brigadier-general in 1699 and was one of the Lords Justices of Ireland from 1702 to 1704.

He married twice but had no surviving children, and was succeeded in his title by his brother, Henry Montgomery.

Peerage of Ireland
| Preceded by Hugh Montgomery | Earl of Mount Alexander; 1663–1717 | Succeeded by Henry Montgomery |
