= Earl of Mount Alexander =

Earl of Mount Alexander was a title in the Peerage of Ireland. It was created in 1661 for Hugh Montgomery, 3rd Viscount Montgomery. He was the grandson of Hugh Montgomery, known as one of the "founding fathers" of the Ulster Scots, who was raised to the Peerage of Ireland as Viscount Montgomery, of the Great Ardes, in 1622. The second Earl lost the Break of Dromore skirmish in 1689, but supported the winning side in the Williamite War. The fourth Earl represented Antrim in the Irish House of Commons. The titles became extinct on the death of the fifth Earl in 1757.

== Viscounts Montgomery (1622) ==
- Hugh Montgomery, 1st Viscount Montgomery (1560–1636)
- Hugh Montgomery, 2nd Viscount Montgomery (1616–1642)
- Hugh Montgomery, 3rd Viscount Montgomery (c. 1625–1663) (created Earl of Mount Alexander in 1661)

== Earls of Mount Alexander (1661) ==
- Hugh Montgomery, 1st Earl of Mount Alexander (c. 1625–1663)
- Hugh Montgomery, 2nd Earl of Mount Alexander (1651–1717)
- Henry Montgomery, 3rd Earl of Mount Alexander (c. 1652–1731)
- Hugh Montgomery, 4th Earl of Mount Alexander (died 1745)
- Thomas Montgomery, 5th Earl of Mount Alexander (died 1757)
