= Hugh Montgomery, 2nd Viscount Montgomery =

Hugh Montgomery, 2nd Viscount Montgomery of the Great Ards, (1597–1642) was an Irish aristocrat who supported the Royalist cause in the Wars of the Three Kingdoms.

== Biography ==
Montgomery was born in 1597 son of Hugh Montgomery, 1st Viscount Montgomery of the Great Ards, Ireland, and Sara Maxwell, daughter of Sir John Maxwell, 4th Lord Herries of Terregles. Montgomery was a colonel in the Royalist army during the Irish Rebellion of 1641. He died on 15 November 1642.

== Marriage and children ==
Montgomery married Jean, eldest daughter of William Alexander, 1st Earl of Stirling, Secretary of State for Scotland and Janet Erskine, (d. autumn 1670), who survived him and remarried to Major-General Robert Monro. By his wife he had four children:

- Hugh Montgomery, 1st Earl of Mount Alexander, eldest son and heir;
- James Montgomery;
- Henry Montgomery;
- Elizabeth Montgomery.

== Sources ==
- Burke, Sir Bernard (1866), A Genealogical History of the Dormant: Abeyant, Forfeited, and Extinct Peerages of the British Empire, Harrison, p. 378
- Rogers, Charles (1877), Memorials of the Earl of Sterling and of the house of Alexander, Edinburgh: W. Paterson, pp. 249–251

Peerage of Ireland
Preceded by Hugh Montgomery	Viscount Montgomery; 1636–1642	Succeeded by Hugh Montgomery
