= Hugh Montgomery, 1st Earl of Mount Alexander =

Irish peer (c. 1623–1663)

Hugh Montgomery, 1st Earl of Mount Alexander (c. 1623 – 15 September 1663), known as The Viscount Montgomery from 1642 to 1661, was an Irish peer. He was appointed to command his father's regiment in 1642. He was commander-in-chief of the Royalist army in Ulster in 1649 and seized successively Belfast, Antrim, County Antrim, and Carrickfergus. He surrendered to Oliver Cromwell, and was banished to Holland. At the Restoration in 1660 he was appointed life master of ordnance in Ireland and one year later created Earl of Mount Alexander.

== Biography ==
Hugh Montgomery was born about 1623, the eldest son of Hugh Montgomery, 2nd Viscount Montgomery, and his wife, Jean Alexander, eldest daughter of Sir William Alexander, 1st Earl of Stirling. In his childhood, his left side was severely injured by a fall, and an extensive abscess was formed, which on healing left a large cavity through which the action of the heart could be plainly discerned He wore a metal plate over the opening.

Notwithstanding his deformity, he had a fairly good constitution, and before reaching his twentieth year travelled through France and Italy. On his return, he was brought to Charles I at Oxford, who was curious to see the strange phenomenon presented in Montgomery's case. He remained some days with the king, and went home, after receiving tokens of the royal favour, and giving assurances of his own loyalty.

By this time the Irish rebellion of 1641 had broken out, and Montgomery's father had raised troops in maintenance of the royal authority, but he died suddenly on 15 November 1642. Montgomery succeeded as 3rd Viscount, and was appointed to the command of his father's regiment. Under Scottish Major-General Robert Monro, who married his mother, Montgomery fought at the Battle of Benburb in June 1646. The king's troops were defeated, and the Viscount, when heading a charge of cavalry, was captured by rebel forces. As a prisoner he was brought to Cloughoughter Castle in County Cavan, where he remained until October 1647. He was exchanged for Richard, 2nd Earl of Westmeath.

Montgomery took a leading part in proclaiming Charles II at Newtownards in February 1649. At the same time the Solemn League and Covenant was renewed, and General George Monck, refusing either to take the covenant or declare for the king, was forced out of Ulster. Montgomery was thereupon commissioned by the king as commander-in-chief of the royal army in Ulster (14 May 1649), with instructions to co-operate with James, Marquis of Ormonde; and in the warlike operations which followed, he successively seized Belfast, Antrim, and Carrickfergus, and, passing through Coleraine, laid siege to Londonderry. After a four-month investiture, however, he was compelled to retire, but joined Ormonde, and aided him in his final efforts against the English Commonwealth.

Forced at last to surrender to Cromwell, he was, after appearing before Parliament in London, banished to Holland, under strict prohibition from corresponding with Charles II. In 1652 he solicited and received permission to return to London, and after much delay was allowed subsistence for himself and his family out of his confiscated estates. He was afterwards permitted to return to Ireland, lived there under strict surveillance, and for a time was imprisoned in Kilkenny Castle.

On the restoration of the monarchy in 1660 Montgomery visited King Charles II at Whitehall. He was appointed for life master of ordnance in Ireland (12 September 1660), was placed on the commission for the settlement of Irish affairs (19 February 1661), and was created Earl of Mount Alexander on 20 June 1661. He died suddenly at Dromore on 15 September 1663, while engaged in investigating Major Blood's plot. He was buried in the chancel of the church at Newtownards.

== Family ==
In personal appearance, Montgomery is described as of medium height, ruddy complexioned, with curly reddish hair and a quick grey eye. He was twice married:

- First, in December 1648, to Mary, eldest daughter of Charles Moore, 2nd Viscount Moore of Drogheda and Alice Loftus, by whom he had two sons Hugh and Henry, who were successively second and third earls of Mount Alexander and a daughter, Jean, who died unmarried in 1673;
- Secondly, in 1660, to Catherine Jones, daughter of Arthur Jones, 2nd Viscount Ranelagh and Katherine Jones, Viscountess Ranelagh, and widow of Sir William Parsons, 2nd Baronet. They had one child, a daughter named Catherine who later married Sir Francis Hamilton, 3rd Baronet of Castle Hamilton. She died in 1692, aged 29 years.

== Notes ==
Peerage of Ireland
New creation	Earl of Mount Alexander; 1661–1663	Succeeded by Hugh Montgomery
Preceded by Hugh Montgomery	Viscount Montgomery; 1642–1663	Succeeded by Hugh Montgomery
