= Lands of Morishill =

- Beith, North Ayrshire, Scotland; UK grid reference NS342535
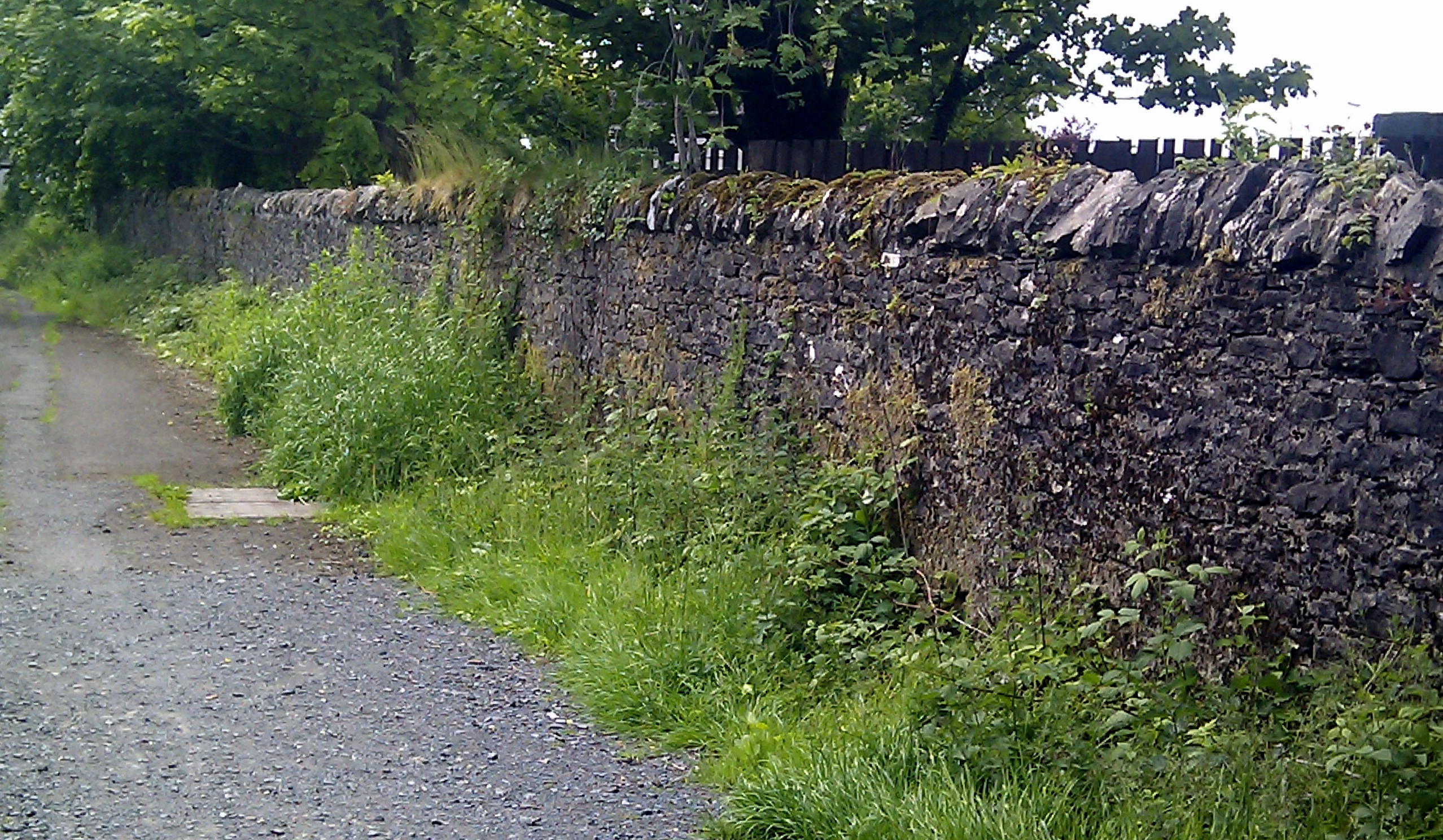
- A section of the old Morishill boundary wall.

Site information
- Type: Laird's House
- Controlled by: Montgomerie
- Open to the public: Yes
- Condition: Demolished

Location
- Shown within Scotland
- Coordinates: 55.7464°N 4.6432°W
- Grid reference: NS 34186 53505

Site history
- Built: 17th century
- Built by: Shedden family
- Materials: Stone

The lands of Morishill, Morrishill, Moorishill or Moricehill were part of the holdings of the Barony of Beith, Regality of Kilwinning and Bailiary of Cuninghame. The name may have derived from large shielings or huts that were once erected at the site.

== History of the lands of Morishill ==
In the early 17th century Robert Peibles held Moreisheills, Pedderland and Maynshill. In 1637 the lands of old extent of 'Morishill' were held by James and Janet Stewart. By 1748 the Adam family had held the 20/- land of old extent of Morishill for several generations, acquiring it through the marriage of Henry Adam with Margaret Stewart, daughter of John Stewart of Morishill. Robert Shedden of Marshalland purchased the property from William Adam upon his return from Virginia where he had prospered as a merchant. He was born on 5 October 1709 as the second son on John Shedden of Marshalland. Robert also purchased the Longcroft, Hillhead, the Shortback of the hill and other lands at Townhead of Broadstone.

William Adam was rather too fond of drink and as a result he failed to manage the lands of Morishill and was advised to sell. Robert Shedden in 1748 purchased the property and this gave rise to this short ditty -

William Adam of Morr'shill
Spent it a' in penny yill;
While Robert Shedden, as I'm told,
Bocht it wi' Virginia gold.

James Dobie was of the opinion that the name 'Morishill' was derived via the old name 'Moreishiels' from the large shielings or temporary summer dwellings for shepherds erected on the site.

=== Lairds ===
After the Adam family, the Sheddens obtained the property. Robert Shedden married Margaret Simson of nearby Willowyard and secondly Elizabeth Moore of Bruntwood, with whom he had seven children. He died in 1759 and his widow married James Wilson, the master of the parish school. The eldest son by this marriage became an eminent surgeon in London. John Shedden, born 1753, inherited in 1760 and after a spell abroad as a merchant he returned and in 1787 married his cousin Barbara Wilson of Kilmarnock and secondly Janet Simson of Willowyard. He had six children and died at Morishill in 1833.

Alexander Shedden inherited in 1833 and in 1842 he also inherited the Willowyard Estate from Mr Wilson of Crummock. Alexander married Jessie Glasgow and had a daughter Jessie Caldwell Shedden; he married secondly Martha Wilson in 1851 with no offspring and died in 1867. Jessie Shedden inherited Morishill, Willowyard, Ferguslie and the Superiority of Drums. Jessie died aged 27 of measles and diphtheria, and the property went to Mrs Shedden-Dobie who died in 1883, aged 97. John Shedden-Dobie succeeded his mother.

In 1938 Morishill was the home of Colonel and Mrs Hope Murray.

== The case of James Montgomery ==
The first case in Scotland of a runaway slave attempting to gain their freedom was that of Jamie or James Montgomery, later named 'Shanker' by Robert Shedden or later still as James Montgomery Shedden. Montgomery had been purchased by Shedden from Joseph Hawkins, a slave trader in Fredericksburg, Virginia, for £56 12s 6d in 1750. He had been baptised as 'Jamie Montgomery' by none other than the Reverend John Witherspoon in Beith. Robert Shedden objected to this as slave owners usually did not allow their slaves to be baptised or to take a Christian first name and surname.

The name 'Shanker' was used by Robert Shedden to reinforce the impression that Montgomery was mere property. Shedden claimed that the baptism was solely undertaken so that Montgomery could unlawfully free himself as a slave. Montgomery was dragged in chains behind a horse to Port Glasgow and put on board a ship bound for Virginia, however on 21 April 1756 he managed to escape with the help of others and made his way to Edinburgh where he was eventually recognised as a runaway slave and placed in the tolbooth following the placing of descriptions of him in the local newspapers.

Shedden had Montgomery apprenticed to a wright or joiner so that as a skilled person he would fetch a much higher price back in Virginia, delivering a handsome profit to his owner. Shedden even petitioned for a quick trial as he had to pay for Montgomery's keep in the tolbooth and because Montgomery was not well. Montgomery died in the Edinburgh tolbooth before the case could be concluded, however it is said that the Lords were going to find in favour of Robert Shedden.

The appellation 'Shanker' appears to be an insult as this word is a variant of 'chancre' which is the name for a sore or ulcer caused by syphilis.

== Morishill House and grounds ==
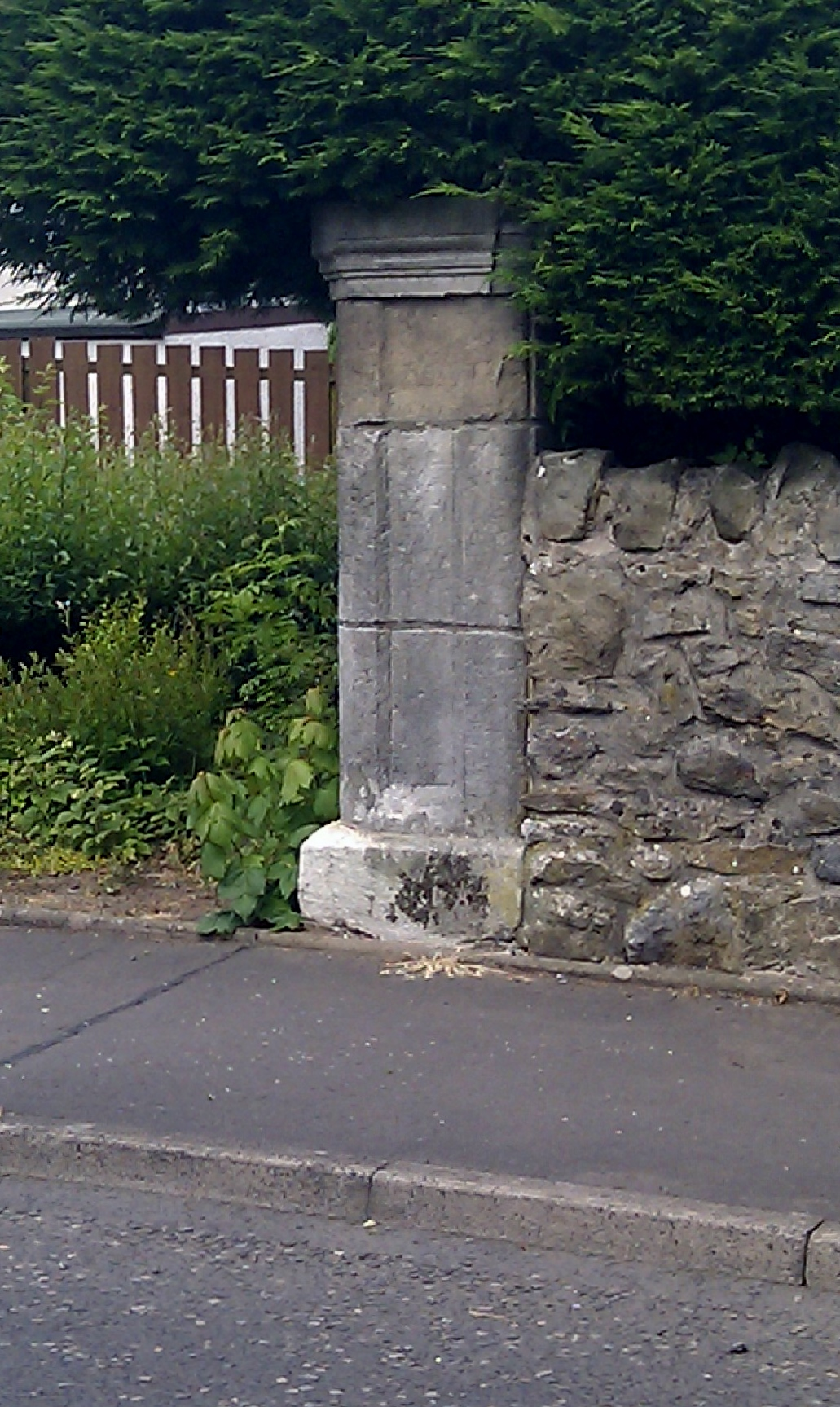
A gatepier from the old estate entrance.

After several years in the West Indies and America as a merchant John Shedden returned to Morishill and made a number of improvements. In the 1830s Alexander Shedden improved the old house and offices at Morishill and also erected a gatehouse and gates, together with many improvements to the gardens which eventually covered fourteen acres. A new house was completed by 1842 and a two-storey detached octagonal tower to the north with a walled garden. The marsh fed by 'Tams Well' was converted into an ornamental lake with three islands.

In the 1870s a new road was made to the stables and in 1888 the original house was unroofed and modified to become an ivy-clad garden feature. This old house had been much altered and improved over the years, serving latterly as a coachmans' quarters. It carried a marriage stone dated 1752 which commemorated the union of Robert Shedden and Margaret Simson, as well as a date stone of 1887 with the initials 'J.S.-D' in relief. A summerhouse and dovecote were present as was a walled garden. A rookery was established at the estate by tying small bundles of sticks in the forks of the trees upper branches.

A feature of the grounds was a copy of the principal pinnacle of the monument in the Skelmorlie Aisle at Largs which had been made by Mr Logan of Beith, a local sculptor. This had been moved here from Grangevale and stood on a wall that linked the house to the laundry; it bore the inscription Designed for Elizabeth by W. Dobie, 24th May 1845.

In 1865 the lands of Morishill extended to 272 acres (110 ha).

The house was demolished in early 1980s and a housing estate named Morishill Manor was built at the site. A large number of the old trees were kept and still grace the estate today (2013).

=== Curling ===
An asphalt artificial curling rink was made for Alexander Shedden at Morishill for playing during the summer months. This game used a 10-inch (25 cm) and 23-pound (10 kg) ball made from lignum vitae covered in copper and previously balanced in a bath of mercury. The ball had a handle which could be pulled out with a hook for use, which then quickly sprung back into place upon release.

The Morishill 'Pleasure pond' otherwise known as 'Beith Loch' was used for curling in the winter months and in 1892 on 27 December the Glasgow Herald records that a match took place between Beith and Morishill. The Beith Morishill Curling Club is still in existence and plays at the Greenacres Curling Rink.

== See also ==
- Lands of Marshalland
- Lands of Willowyard
