= Lands of Bogston =

- Beith, North Ayrshire, Scotland; UK grid reference NS3578151453
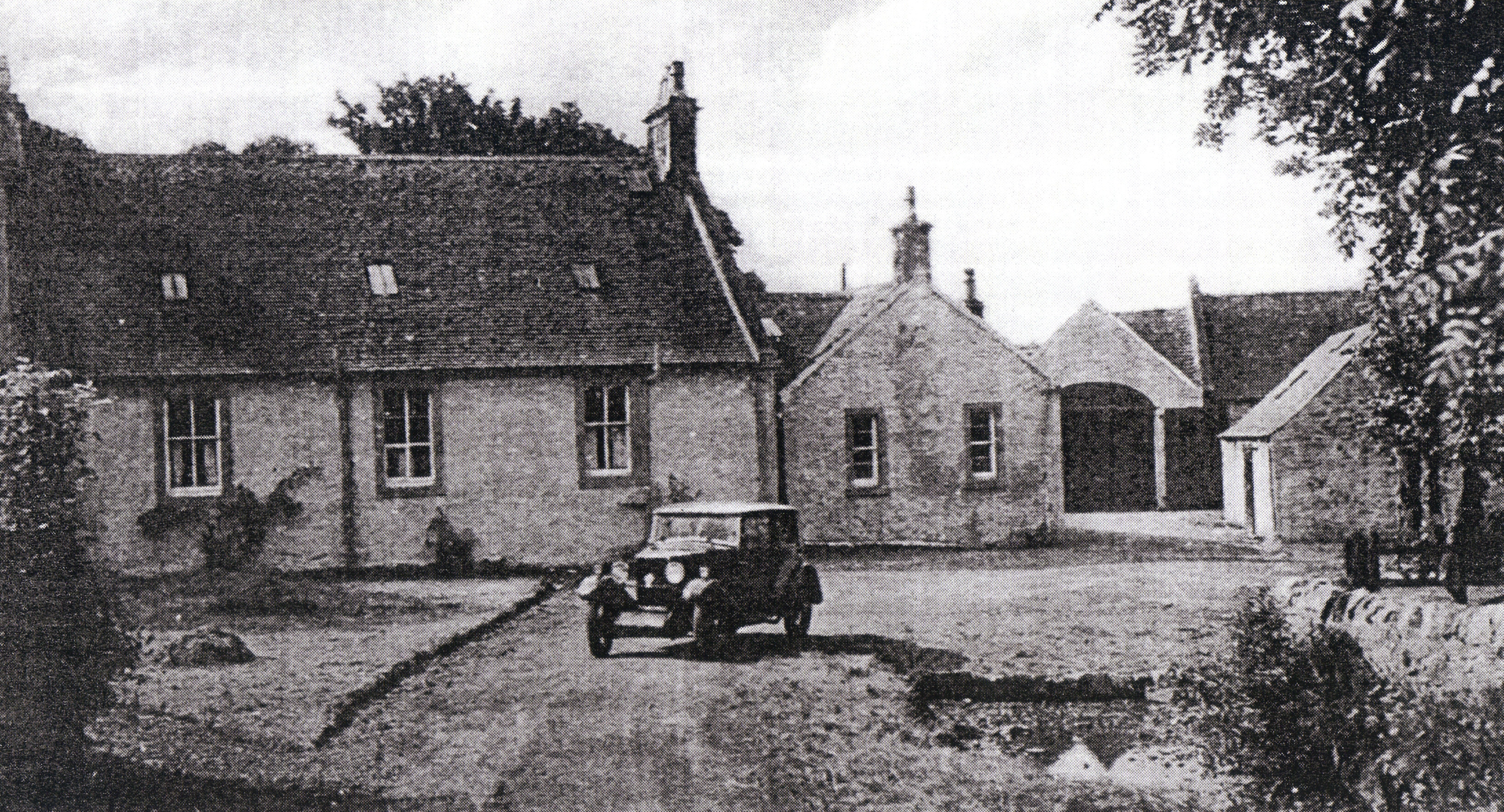
- Bogstone Farm

Site information
- Type: Manor House
- Owner: Private
- Controlled by: Clan Montgomery
- Open to the public: No
- Condition: Demolished

Location
- Shown within Scotland
- Coordinates: 55.72867°N 4.61579°W
- Grid reference: NS 35781 51453

Site history
- Built: 16th century
- Built by: Montgomerie family
- Materials: Stone

Bogston also known as Bogstone was a small estate in the old Barony of Giffen near Barrmill in the Parish of Beith, North Ayrshire, once held by collateral descendants of the Montgomeries of Broadstone. The estate covered 160 acres or around 65 hectares, its rental in 1896 being £180 per annum. The farm and its land were recorded as covering 100 fertile acres (0.40 km2) in 1820.

== Bogston House and estate ==
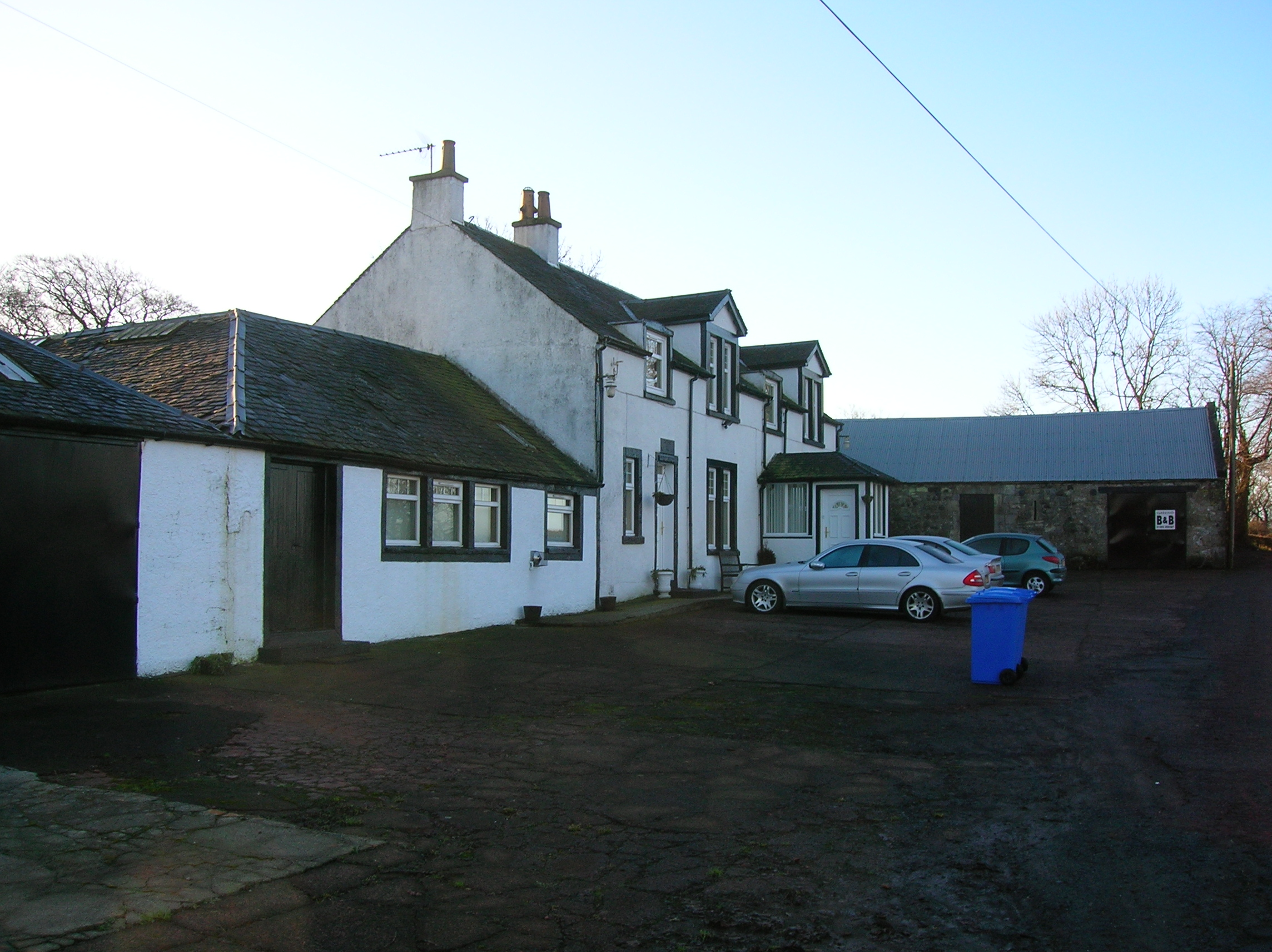
The farm of Gatend.

This was a residence of the Montgomerie family and it lay between South Barr, Hayhills and Bogfaulds Farms in what is now DM Beith. Bogston was once a well-wooded estate of 100 fertile acres (0.40 km^{2}), with fine plantings, orchards and gardens. The famous Bogston yew tree, when it fell in 1874, was 38 feet high, with a spread of 50 feet, and a circumference of 9 feet 10 inches. At first, Bogston was accessed from near the site of Gatend, a farm named from its position, however, later a main entrance was created via the old Bellcraig House off the Barrmill to Beith road. Porterfield records that this was in 1775 at the time when Bogston itself was being remodelled as noted below. The parish boundary between Beith and Dalry runs close by, partly along the margin of the Bankhead raised bog which explains the many boundary stones marked on OS maps.

Robert Montgomery built a substantial but plain house at Bogston in 1775, enclosed the ground and improved the lands. He subdivided the ground to create suitable sized fields, planted belts of trees and created a one-third of a mile long entrance that ran from the high road. The house was one of the first in the district to be slated, Morishill being the next. A belt of forest trees protected a large and well-stocked orchard that surrounded the house on two sides. Plantings included lilac, laburnum, rhododendron, daffodils, etc. The large yew tree stood on the lawn facing the front of the house.

The rookery at Bogston was unusual in that the birds had been induced to nest at the site, the first recorded time that this had been achieved until one was likewise 'induced' at Morishill by the simple expedient of tying sticks in the branches. It was noted that upon the death of Robert Wilson Montgomerie or 'Bogston' as he was styled, the crows left the rookery.

== The lairds ==
Matthew Montgomerie of Bogston, a covenanter, was renowned for his strength and athletic prowess and upon being attacked by two of Claverhouse's Dragoons he is recorded as having killed them both at nearby Bankhead Moss. He also escaped upon being apprehended by Dragoons whilst he was attending the church of Beith.

Part of the Giffen Barony, this property was feued out by the 7th Earl of Eglinton to Robert Montgomerie in 1663, however it was occupied by the family prior to this date. Robert was a collateral descendant of the Montgomeries of Broadstone and Giffen, said to have had considerable wealth and a man of great local importance through being the Earl of Eglinton's Baron Bailie of the Lordship of Giffen. He married first Ann Harvie of Braidlie and second Elizabeth, his cousin, eldest daughter of William Muir of Bruntwood. In all he married four times.

His eldest son Matthew inherited the property in 1682, married Janet Moor of Bruntwood, had children Robert and Margaret, but died aged 27, predeceasing his father. The son Robert had eighteen children, fifteen of whom predeceased him. His heiress daughter married Baron Baillie John Wilson of Kilmarnock, however their son Robert agreed to change his name to Montgomery as heir to his grandfather, became a merchant in Virginia in 1775 and returned after nine years to die at the age of 95 in 1832 at Crummock House, Beith. Robert's portrait was painted by Sir Henry Raeburn was eventually sent to relatives, the Decker's, in Prussia.

On 26 April 1784 Margaret Montgomerie, youngest daughter of Bailie Wilson, married Dr Robert Borland of Kilmarnock at Bogston who had made a considerable sum of money as a doctor and a plantation owner in Jamaica.

Robert Montgomerie of Bogston's son, also Robert, inherited Craighouse and his granddaughter married the Rev. John Witherspoon, onetime minister of Beith and a signatory to the United States Declaration of Independence.

Robert Montgomerie Borland as the only son of Robert Wilson Montgomery's sister Mary Borland, married Charlotte Roche and their son Robert Borland Montgomerie, having taken his grand-uncle's surname, inherited Bogston but lived at Malmedy in Prussia and only visited once in 1842. He borrowed against the property and died unmarried at Malmedy in 1847 at which point his sister Charlotte inherited. She had married Jean Paul Decker of Cologne and in 1848 she sold the property to Robert Spier's widow, Margaret Gibson Spier. In 1926 the farm was sold to James Blair and in 1941 it was subject to compulsory purchase by RNAD who demolished the buildings shortly after.

== Bogstone Farm ==
After the 1848 sale the mansion house and offices were altered and became a farm steading. The gardens were abandoned and the orchard and its trees died. The famous yew tree suffered from a lack of shelter and the belt of forest trees were felled.

In 1906 a short mineral freight line joined the nearby Barr colliery coal pit with the main line near Giffen station. In its latter days, Bogston was a farm, sitting close to the Bombo Burn with a large area of land next to it recorded on the OS map as 'Bogston Meadow' formed through the canalisation of the burn. Following the creation of the munitions storage facility, Bogston was demolished and is now only indicated by a small group of trees.

In 1912 Bogstone was one of the farms held by the Spier's Trust and was subject to an official inspection by representatives of the trust. The Cuff, Marshyland, Bellcraig, and Lugtonridge were also owned by the trust at this time.

== See also ==
- Broadstone Castle and Barony, Ayrshire
- Barrmill
- Lands of Marshalland
- Lands of Morishill
- Spier's school
