= Lands of Marshalland =

- Beith, North Ayrshire, Scotland; UK grid reference NS352531
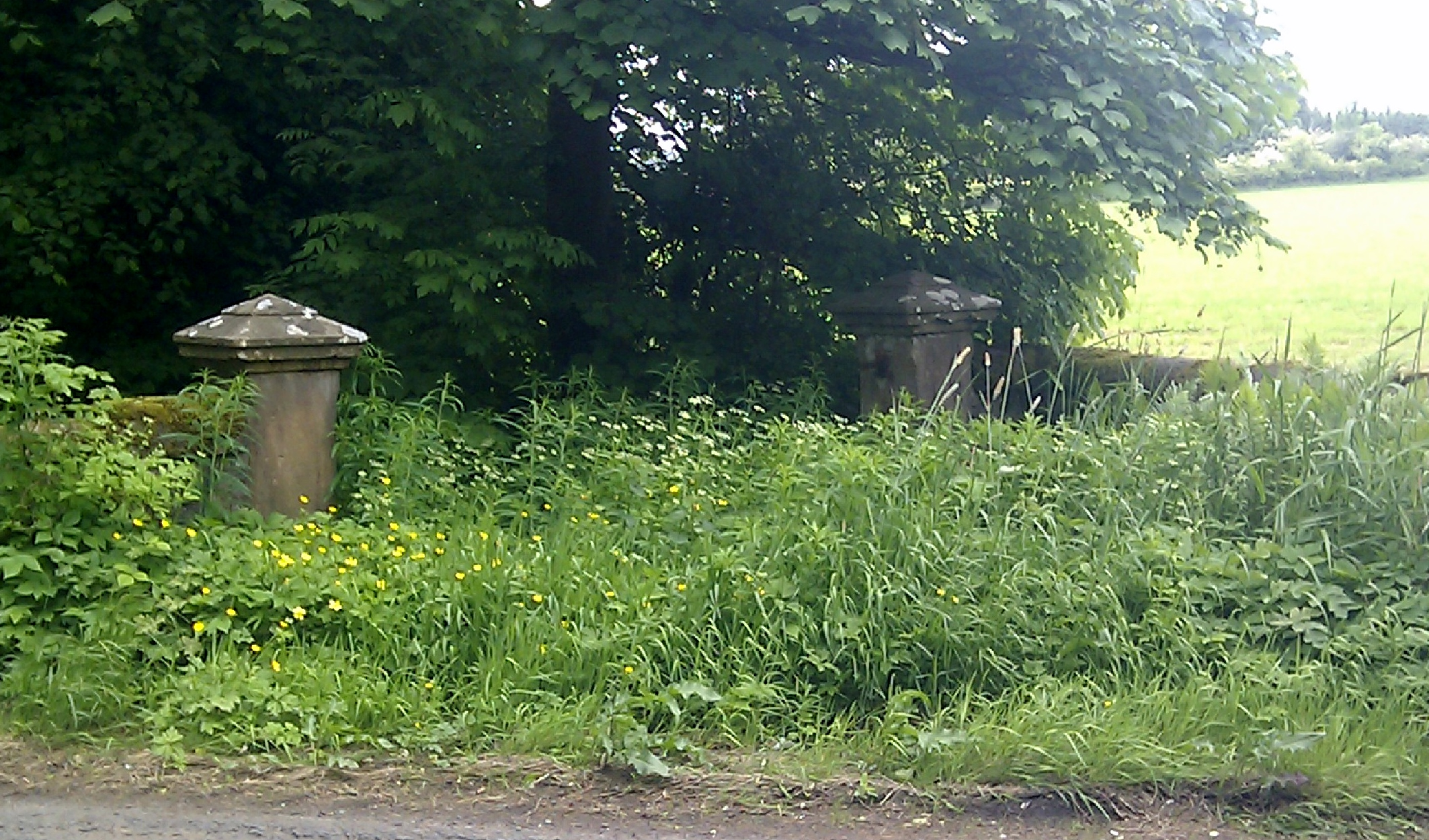
- The old entrance to Marshalland House

Site information
- Type: Laird's House
- Owner: Spier's Trust
- Controlled by: Montgomerie
- Open to the public: Yes
- Condition: Demolished

Location
- Shown within Scotland
- Location within Scotland
- Coordinates: 55.7434°N 4.6263°W

Site history
- Built: 17th century
- Built by: Shedden family
- Materials: Stone

The lands of Marshalland, Marsheland, Marsheyland or Marshyland were part of the holdings of the Barony of Beith, Regality of Kilwinning and Bailiary of Cuninghame. They became the property of the Lyle family, then the Shedden family, passing next to the Spier's family before finally becoming part of the Spier's Trust lands. The laird's house and farm were demolished in the 1960s.

== The History of the Lands of Marshalland ==
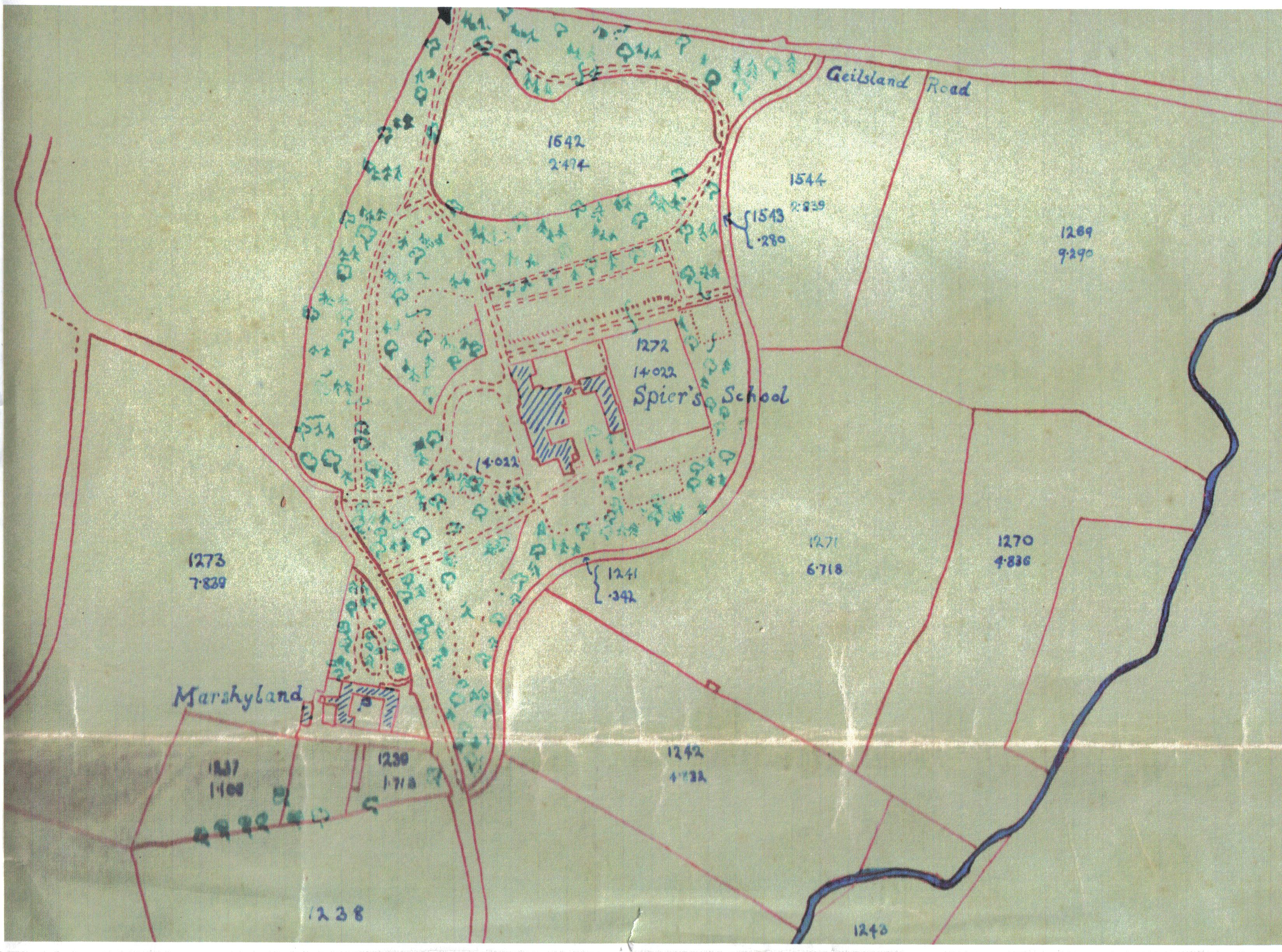
Marshalland and Spier's School.

Hugh Montgomery of Broadstone granted a mortgage on the lands of Broadstone to his brother-in-law, Sir John Shaw in 1650. Sir John stayed at Broadstone Castle occasionally until circa 1700 but gradually alienated the estate in feus until only the farm upon which the castle stood remained and as it is recorded in 1686 that Sir John Shaw confirmed the sale then Marshalland seems to have originally been part of the Broadstone Castle lands.

The 14/- shilling lands of Marshalland were acquired by John Shedden "of Hazlehead-toun" from John and Hugh Lyles in 1686 and later he also acquired the 32 Penny lands that were locally known as Erestoun's Mailing or Burnside of Marshalland. In 1748 John Shedden acquired from John Shedden of Headrighead a dwelling house at Marshalland and a farm yard, an acre of land and another acre of land of the Mains of Broadstone. In 1752 John Shedden acquired Townhead of Broadstone from Neil Snodgrass which in 1757 he sold to his brother Robert Shedden of Morishill.

Roy's map of 1747 refers to the site as 'Marchland', possibly indicating that the lands of 'Marshalland' lay on the boundary or march of the Barony of Broadstone within the Lordship of Giffen, and the Barony of Beith, the physical boundary being formed by the Powgree Burn at this point, which is also recorded as the Powgreen or Marshyland burn. Marshalland lay within the Barony of Broadstone. Later maps refer to the site as Marshyland and Marshalland.

The land upon which Spier's school was built in 1858 only shows the presence of two wells and the fields of the old Marshalland Farm with its tree lined hedgerows. Tom Paterson and his sister farmed Marshalland in the 50s, however the last people to live at Marshalland were David and Mary Kerr, the fine house and associated farm buildings being demolished in the early 1960s.

=== Geilsland ===
Geilsland is recorded as a half merk land, part of the 4 merk land of Marshalland, in the Barony of Braidstone. 'Neilsland' is said to have been an earlier name for the land. The name is pronounced 'Jillsland' locally. The origin of the name may refer to a gil or gyll, referring to a cleft or ravine as found at the 'Fairy Glen' where the Powgree Burn cuts through the fields.

Prior location of Marshalland House

=== The Lairds ===
These 14/- shilling lands were acquired by John Shedden "of Hazlehead-toun" from John and Hugh Lyles in 1686 and later he also acquired the 32 Penny lands that were locally known as Erestoun's Mailing or Burnside of Marshalland. John the elder had four sons, John (b. 1676), Robert (b. 1679), William (b. 1691) and James (b. circa 1694). John and Robert were born at Upper Hessilhead. In 1746 John's son, also John, passed the lands of Marshalland to his eldest son, again John, reserving only "certain houses and fields" to himself.

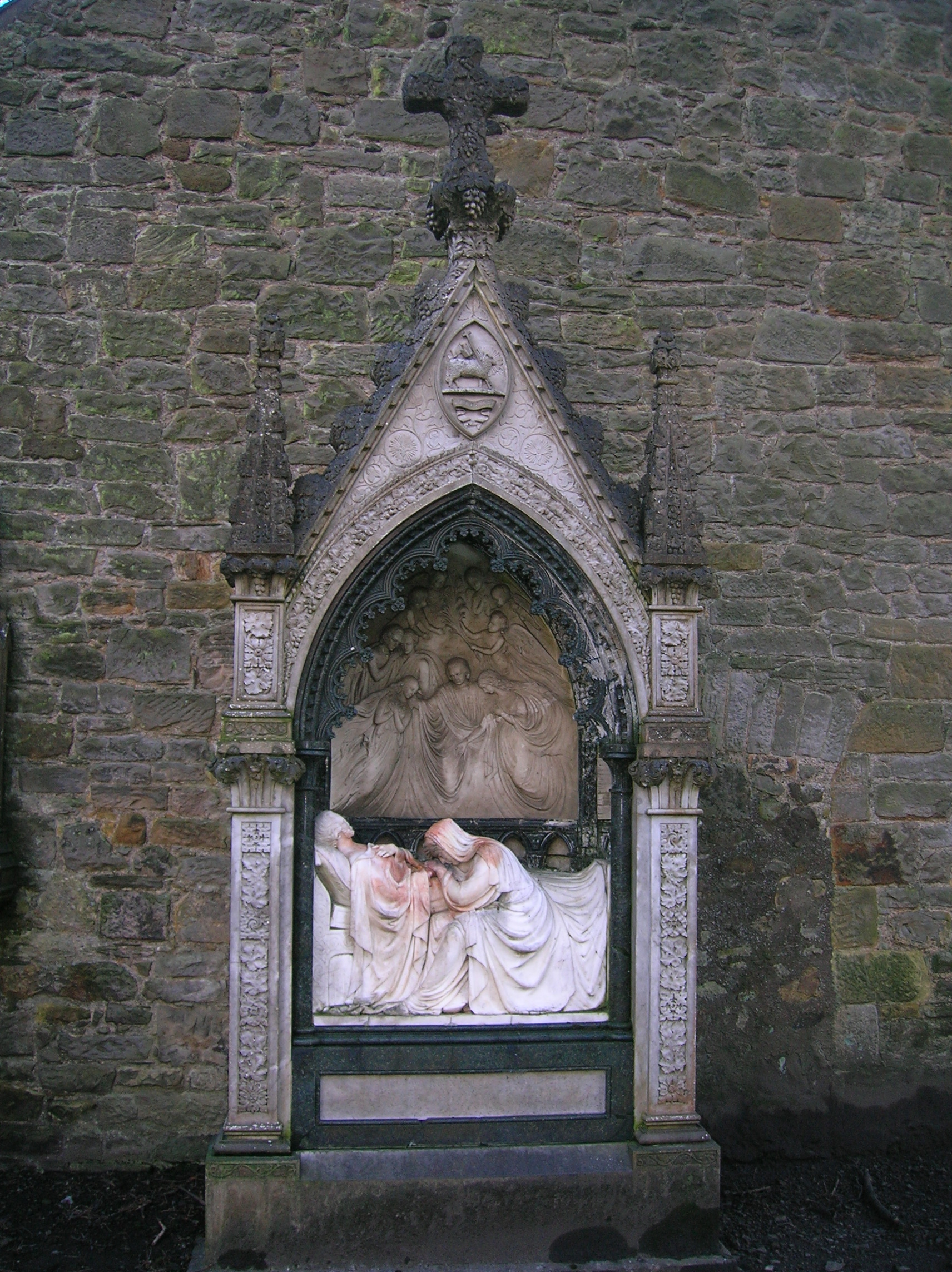
The John Spier Memorial at Beith's Old Kirk.

John the younger, circa 1706, married Margaret Montgomerie, daughter of Matthew Montgomerie of Bogston. The couple had nine children, five sons and four daughters. He was an elder of the church in 1710 and in 1727 he was appointed to "perambulate and value" the lands of Mainshill in Beith that the Earl of Eglinton was intending to exchange for the old Glebe of Beith. John died circa 1765 and his son sold Marshalland to Robert Service who farmed at the Bigholm in 1785.

John Shedden the younger was known as "The Lang Laird" and married Mary Stevenson of Townend of Threepwood. The couple had five daughters and one son, John, known as "Jack the Marshalland" or "The Gem-keeper".

Robert Service in 1785 had purchased Marshalland and in 1816 his son, Robert "of Bogside" inherited and sold the property to Robert Spier, writer in Beith. The lands were inherited by his son John who lived at Eglinton Street in Beith and then became a part of the Foundation endowment of Spier's School, now the Spier's Trust.

In the 1850s an Andrew Spier is listed as resident at Marshyland (sic).

==== Jack the Marshalland ====
Born on 25 April 1756, the last John Shedden of Marshalland married Mary Raeside in 1836, however they had no offspring. John was a tall man, strong and a notorious poacher of hares at a time when poaching was governed by archaic laws. After several court appearances Jack moved to a large estate in England where he worked as the head gamekeeper, earning a good wage and returning with substantial savings. On his return he became ironically known as "The Gem keeper" and when he died his poacher friend Thomas Stevenson fired off his gun to the "rict and left" over his grave, much to the surprise of George Colville, the minister at the time.

=== Marshalland House and farm ===
In around 1820 the part of the Marshal-land (sic) held by Robert Spier had a rent value of £58 18s 2d, whilst that part held by Mrs. Gibson was valued at £20 0s 0d. Aitken's 1829 map shows an R. Spier Esquire as resident at Marsheyland (sic).

Andrew Spier, John Spier's brother, is designated 'of Marshalland' and may have lived there until his untimely death.

=== The estate ===
Roy's Military Survey of 1747 shows the 'Marchland' farm buildings spread over both sides of the road through the farm with small areas of woodland located near to each group of buildings. In 1820 'Marsheyland' is recorded on Thomson's map with a single building only, located on the approximate site of Marshalland House. The later Ordnance Survey maps show a farm behind Marshalland House with two wings, expanding between 1856, 1897 and 1909 to include other outbuildings, a sheepwash across the road and a likely horse-engine.

The dwelling house consisted of a central roughcast dwelling and side wings which were plain ashlar. A gated side entrance existed with a gated main entrance that had a circular driveway and a central island. The side gates were stolen in 2012. After demolition the site became overgrown, however the old stone boundary walls remain in part and several large old lime trees still dominate the old garden area.

The total area of the farm lands was 76.3 acres (309,000 m^{2}).

=== Marshalland Burn ===
This small burn rises from several springs within the grounds of the old Spier's, runs under the road near the main Barrmill Road entrance to then be piped under the field where it emerges on the boundary of the Marshalland Playing Fields before its confluence with the Powgree Burn near the old railway bridge at the 'T' junction for the DM Beith site. Polish prisoners of war in WW2 used to collect their water from the Marshalland springs and it is thought that the old carbonated water factory near Bellscauseway that produced 'cooling and temperance drinks' used these waters. This enterprise was established in 1891 by Mr T. Murray and produced soda water, aerated water, seltzer, potass, magnesia, lemonade, ginger beer and ginger ale.

== Spier's school ==
=== School history ===
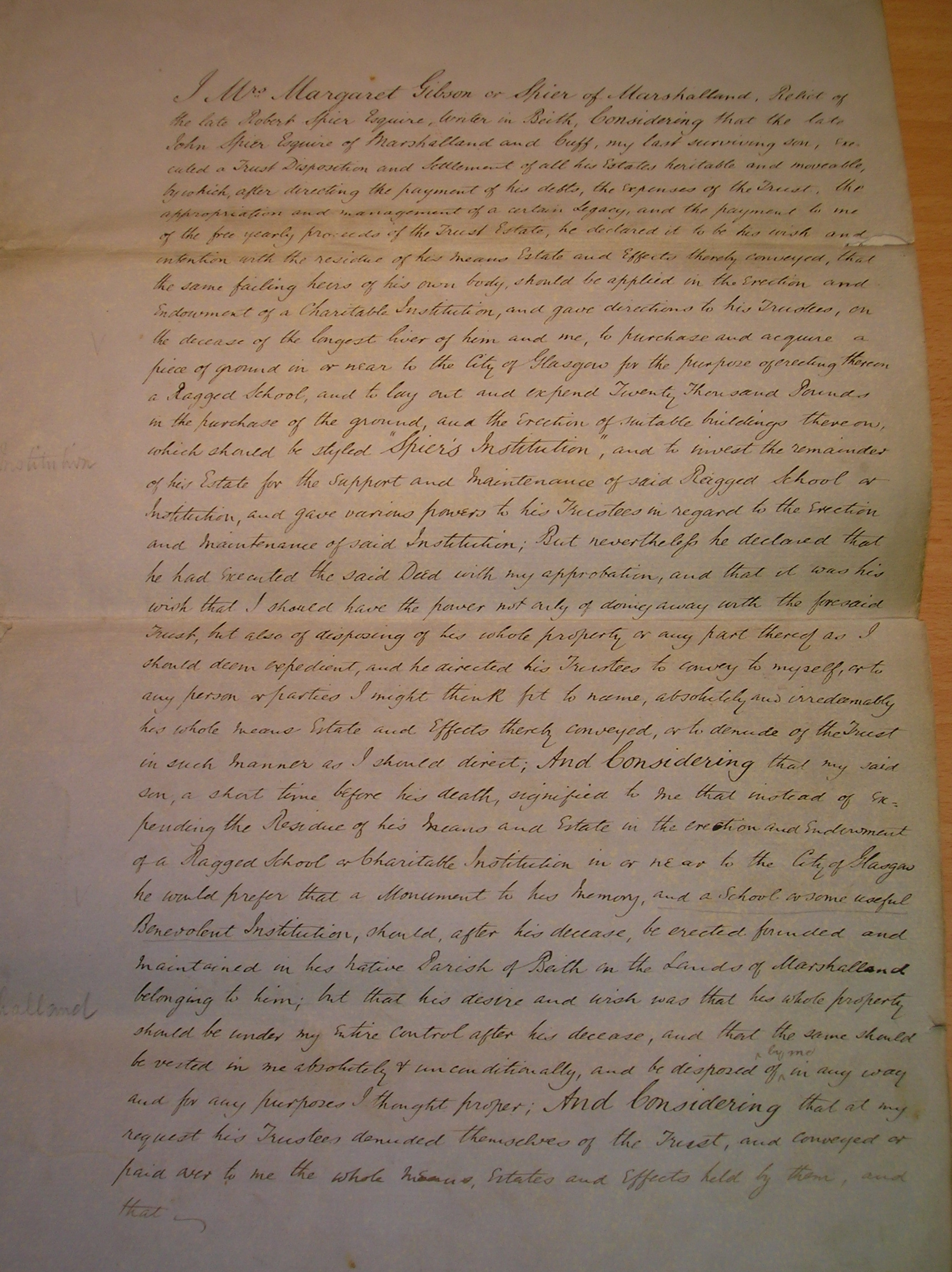
The Spier's Institution Feu Disposition of 1887

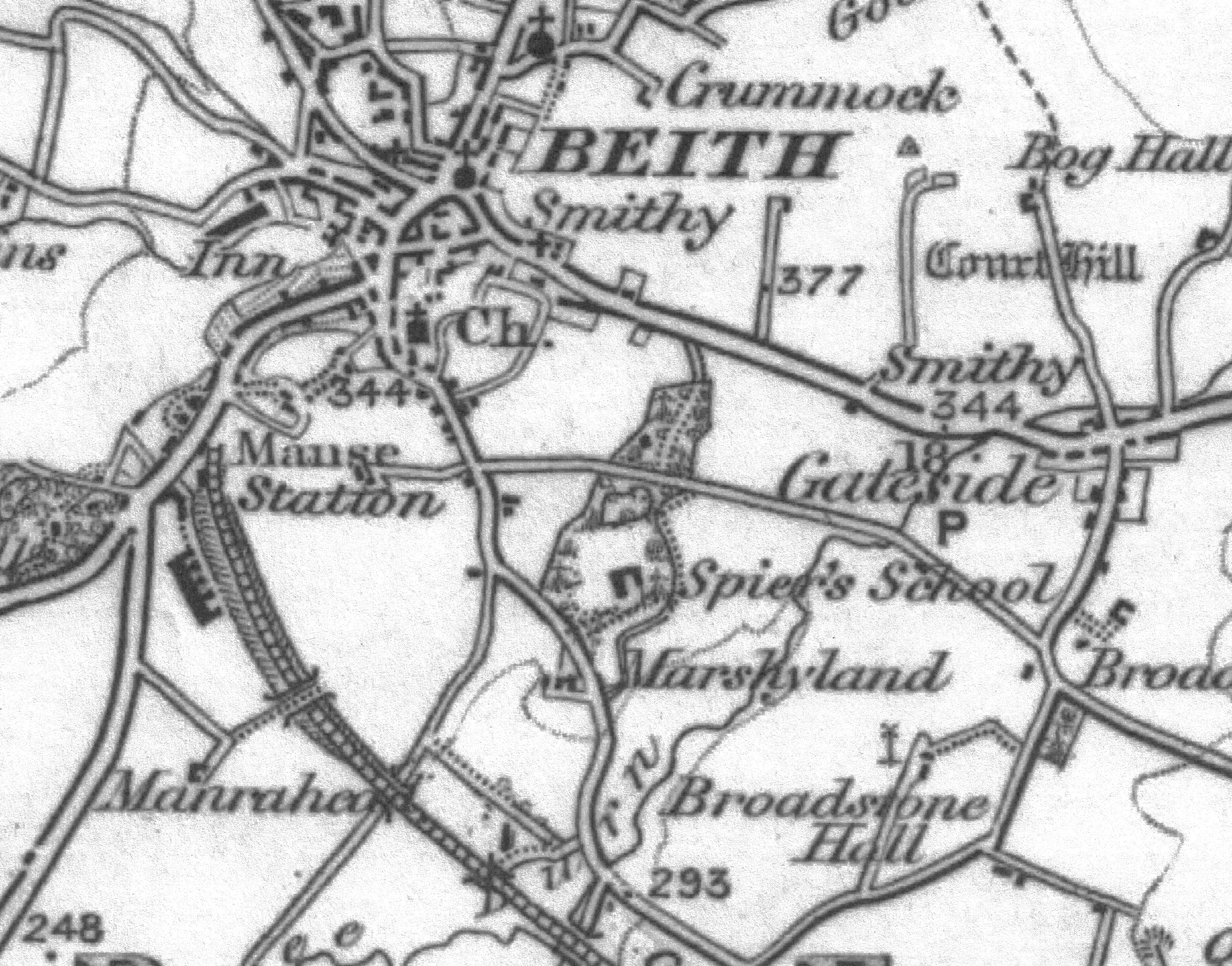
Spier's school's location near Beith

John Spier was the son of Robert Spier, writer and bank agent in Beith, owner of the Marshalland and Cuff estates Bogstone, Bellcraig, Eastend of Shutterflat and Lugton Ridge farms. Robert was descended from the Spier's of Kersland Mill, which he purchased from his elder brother and through good business acumen accumulated a considerable fortune of £40,000 in land and money.

John Spier of Cuff predeceased his mother, dying in 1858 at the age of 28 in Largs; Margaret Gibson Spier (died, possibly from a carriage accident, in 1870), also from a local family, who followed his wishes and erected a school on part of the lands of Marshalland as a memorial to her son at a cost of £12,000. Andrew Spier of Marshalland, John's brother, had also pre-deceased his mother and brother. After many discussions and a Royal Commission investigation, the final plan for a school emerged as a co-educational day school equipped to take a few boarders. The school closed in 1972 when Garnock Academy was opened and after vandalism and structural decay the buildings were demolished in 1984 and the rubble used to fill an old quarry at Lyonshields Farm near Gateside.

The ghost of John Spier was said to roam the school tower, possibly to discourage students from exploring it, and that of his mother, Margaret Spier, the school grounds.

== Micro-history ==
Beith Football Club were based at Marshalland over the years 1882–1883, showing that a playing field was present before Spier's school was built in 1887-88.

The old school's playing fields are still used for football and have acquired the name 'Marshland'.
