= Lands of Willowyard =

Estate in North Ayrshire, Scotland

- Beith, North Ayrshire, Scotland; UK grid reference NS335536
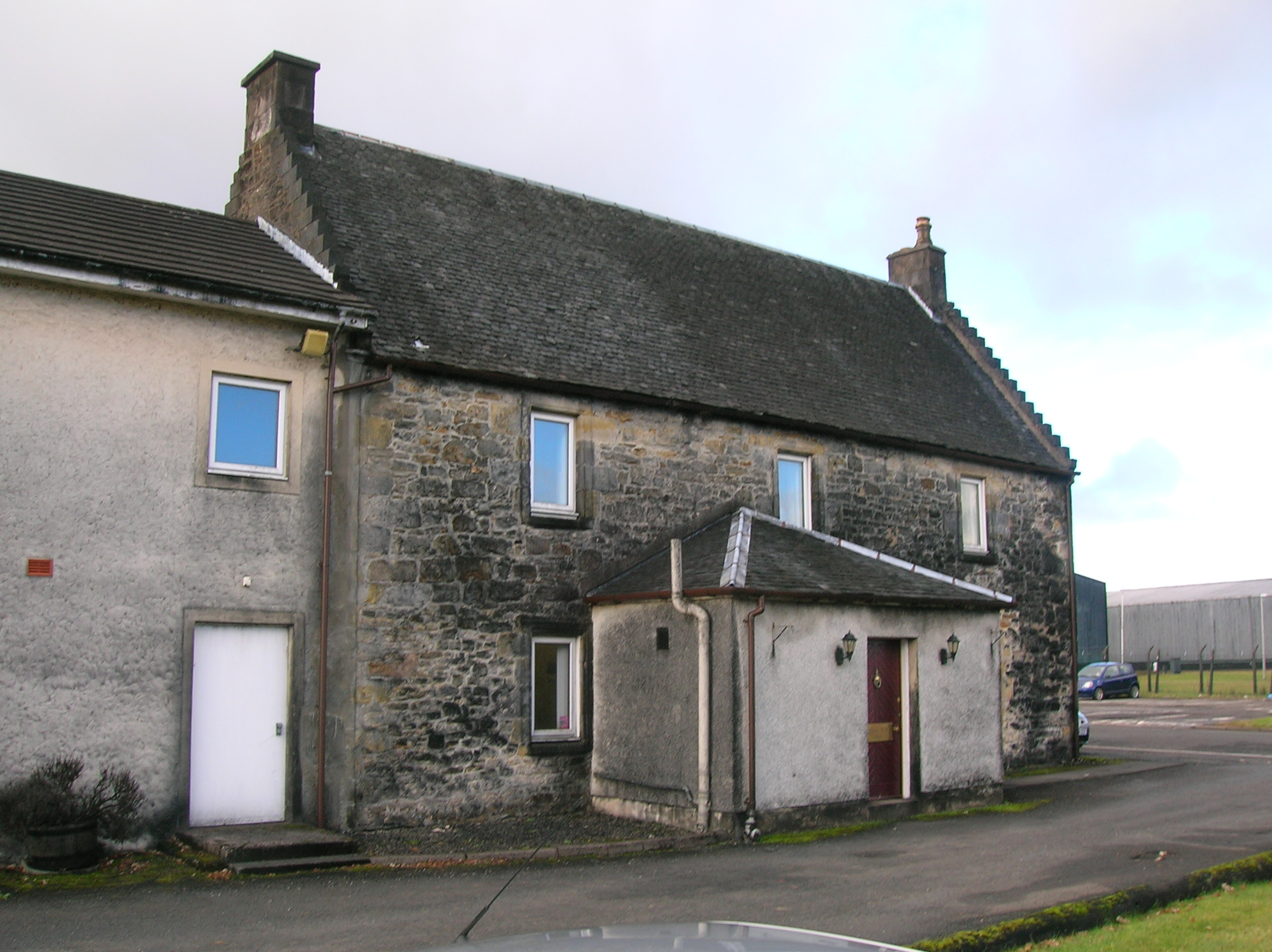
- Willowyard House

Site information
- Type: Manor House
- Owner: A business premises
- Controlled by: Montgomery Clan
- Open to the public: No
- Condition: Much modified

Location
- Shown within Scotland
- Coordinates: 55.747148°N 4.653992°W
- Grid reference: NS 3351153610

Site history
- Built: 18th century
- Built by: Montgomerie family
- Materials: Stone

The ancient lands of Willowyard, Willieyeards, Williyard or Willizeards were part of the holdings of the Regality of Kilwinning, Barony of Beith, and Bailiary of Cuninghame. They later became the property of the Montgomerie family before being sold to the Simson family in 1723. The manor house still survives as part of a business premises and the nearby industrial estate and whisky bond carry the name 'Willowyards'.

== The history of the Lands of Willowyard ==
On the eastern side of Kilbirnie Loch lie the ancient lands of Willowyard, locally pronounced 'Williyard', and the various 'Mains' properties associated with it. A parsonage and vicarage were once located on these "20/- lands of old extent".

=== The Lairds ===
These lands were passed to Helen, daughter of Robert Lord Boyd, in her pure, spotless, and inviolate virginity and were held by her for life, the feu for the property passing to the abbot and convent of Kilwinning. Blaeu's map of Timothy Pont's survey marks the property as 'Williezeards'. In 1559 Hugh Montgomery of Hessilhead held the lands of old extent of Williyard, in the parish of Beith and regality of Kilwinning. The lands became the property of the Hon. Francis Montgomerie of Giffin and then passed to his nephew, Alexander, 9th Earl of Eglinton.

In 1723 Mr William Simson or Simpson obtained the property from the Earl. in 1721 he married Barbara Barclay of Warrix and after she died, to Elizabeth Moore of Bruntwood in 1726. His first wife's father had been a Provost of Irvine. He also had a third marriage in 1736 to Hannah Crochet or Crokat of Glasgow. He had three daughters, Janet, Margaret and Elizabeth, together with a son William. William Simson was said to be a man of expensive tastes and his son William was forced in 1772 to sell the estate to Mr John Ker of London. By 1777 Mr Ker had sold the property to Mr John Neale or Neil of Edinburgh. In 1804 John Neale sold the property to Mr Robert Steel of Port Glasgow with John and Robert Duncan recorded as tenants. By 1833 William Wilson (son of Janet Simson) had purchased his ancestral lands of Willowyards and his nephew, Alexander Shedden of Morishil later inherited.

=== Willowyard House ===
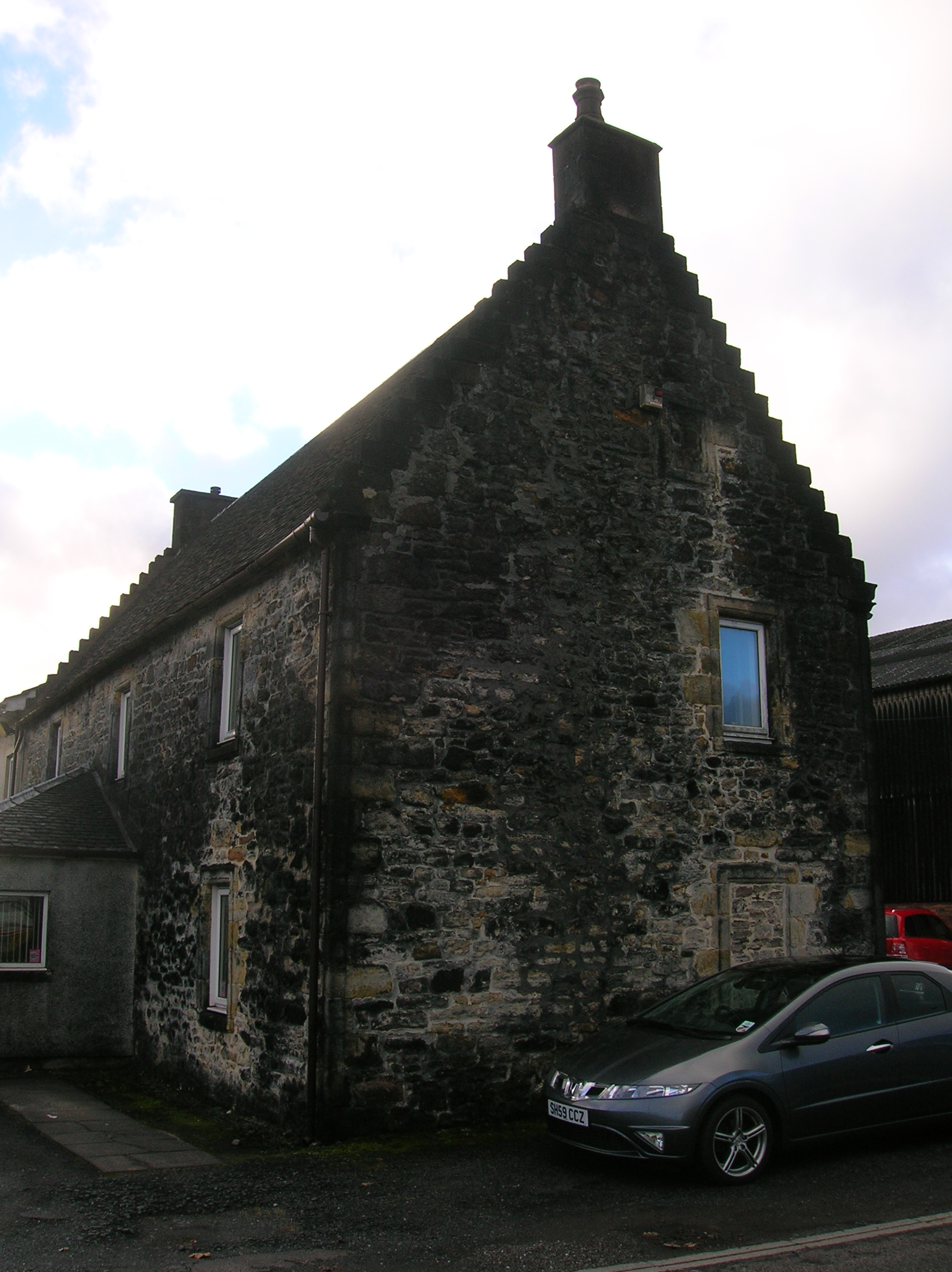
Willowyard House, gable end

The surviving Willowyard House dates from 1727 in the form of 7271 is for some unrecorded reason carved on the exterior of the house. Circa 1750 a William Simson is recorded as the owner. By the end of the 18th century Willowyards was a well established farmstead and the Edinburgh Advertiser describes it as: consisting of about 175 English acres of arable land, well enclosed and subdivided into fifteen fields, and let by one lease to three substantial tenants for 19 years at £130 per annum. Upon this property there is a good house, and garden stocked with fruit trees, a malt mill and an elegant court of offices newly erected. A valuable flag and stone quarry has been opened in the ground and it is believed there are both coal and limestone in it. There are about ten acres of wood and a good deal of timber on this farm; and thriving belts of planting surround the greatest part of it.

It is likely that William Simson built the surviving mansion house of two storeys and garrets in the early 1770s and when constructed it was one of the most luxurious habitations in the parish, set in picturesque surroundings. It was approached by an avenue of tree planted during the time of the Montgomeries and a plantation of old trees also existed at the far end of the enclosure. Three of these beech trees circumferences were measured in 1890 at 11 feet 4 inches, 10 feet and 9 feet, all two feet from the ground. A once well laid out garden and orchard was present to the right and in front of Willowyard House, divided by the Willowyard Burn that runs from Braidinhill to its confluence with Kilbirnie Loch. In 1893 Willowyard House was restored both inside and out, the roof also being replaced at this time. The rubble walls of the mansion house were formerly harled and the window and angle margins left as exposed dressed stone; the roof was originally thatched.

=== Willowyard House Today (2017) ===
The Willowyard House is currently utilized as an office building to the attached manufacturing facility for Chemtec UK Ltd., a subsidiary of Armstrong-Chemtec Group. Armstrong-Chemtec Group is an international engineering and manufacturing source for heat transfer equipment used around the world starting back in 1946.

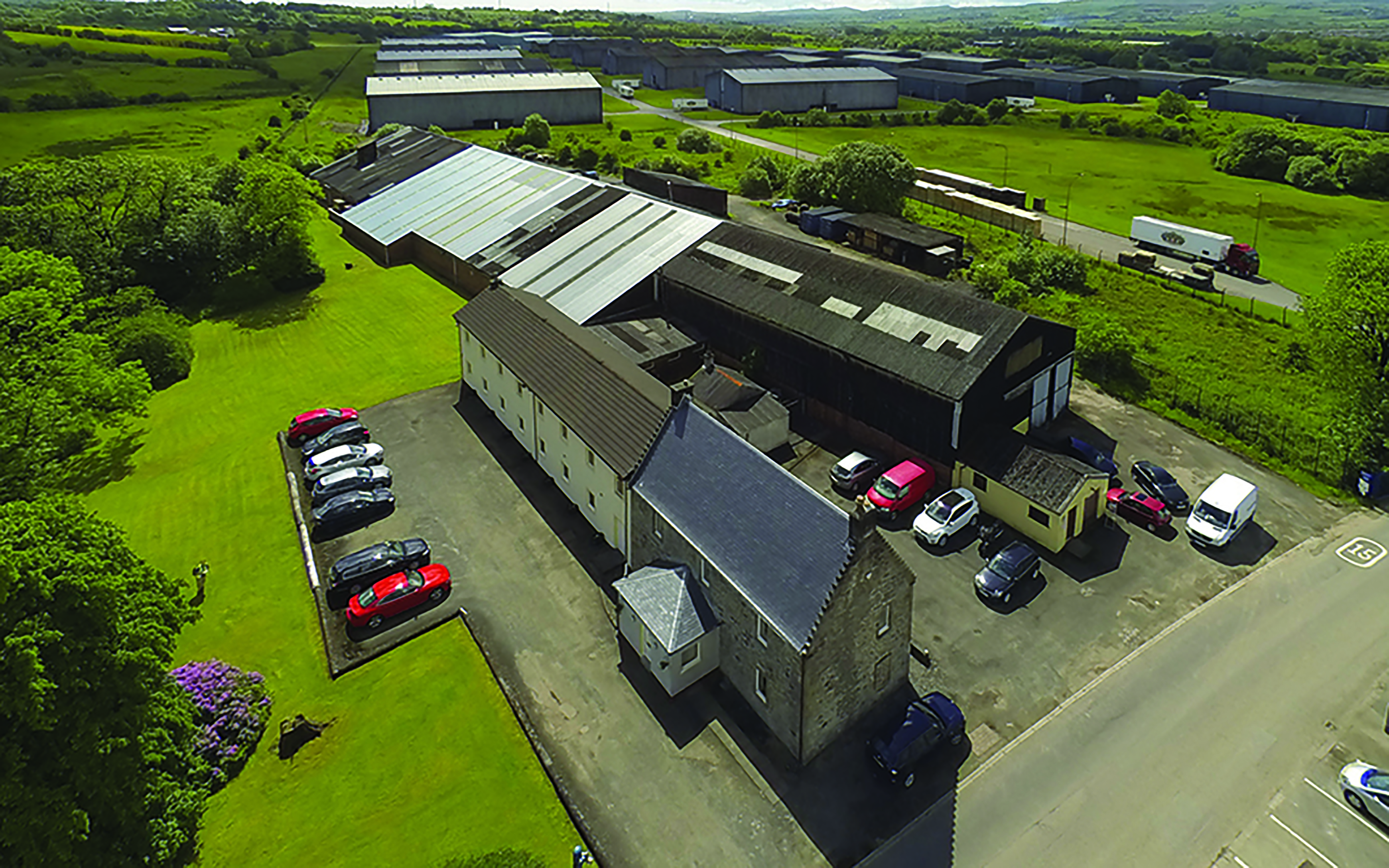
Willowyard House currently used as offices for Chemtec UK.

=== The estate ===
In 1820 Willowyard is recorded as being an estate of 120 acres, well planted up by the owner with belts of plantings and the fine house situated in full view of the loch. The estate sits on whinstone and a small quarry nearby became an ornamental lake. In 1820 John Neil Esq of Edinburgh was the owner. By 1822 the owner of Willowyard is recorded as Robert Steel or Steele, a Port Glasgow ironmaster and the lands were assessed as the 14th most valuable in the parish at £114 per year valued rent. The 1827 map by Aitken marks the estate as being the property of Robert Steel Esq. In the New Statistical Account, William Wilson, a maternal descendant of previous owners purchased the estate in 1832 and in 1839 Alexander Shedden is noted as the owner.

=== Mains ===
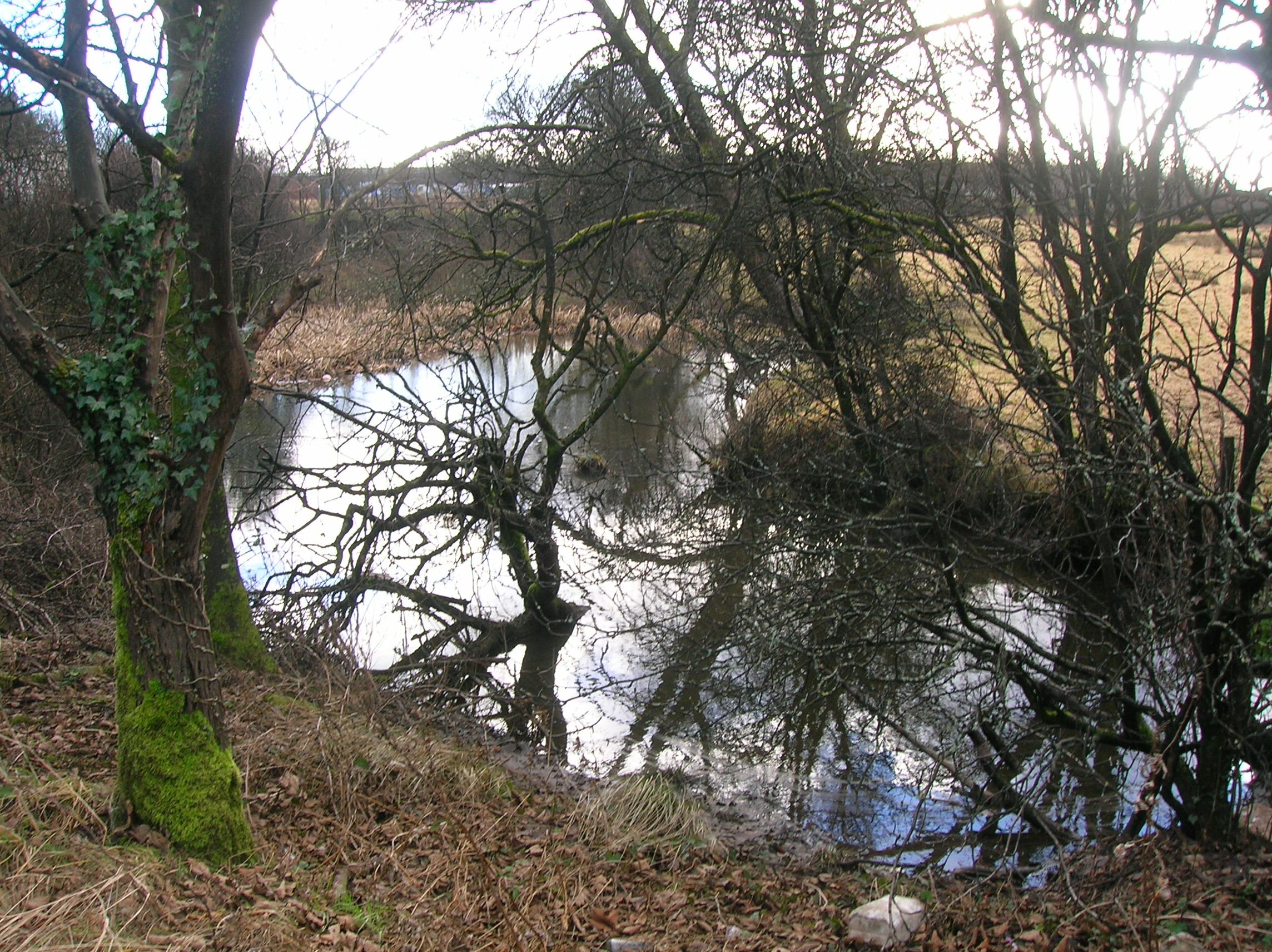
Old ornamental pond formed from an old Whinstone quarry

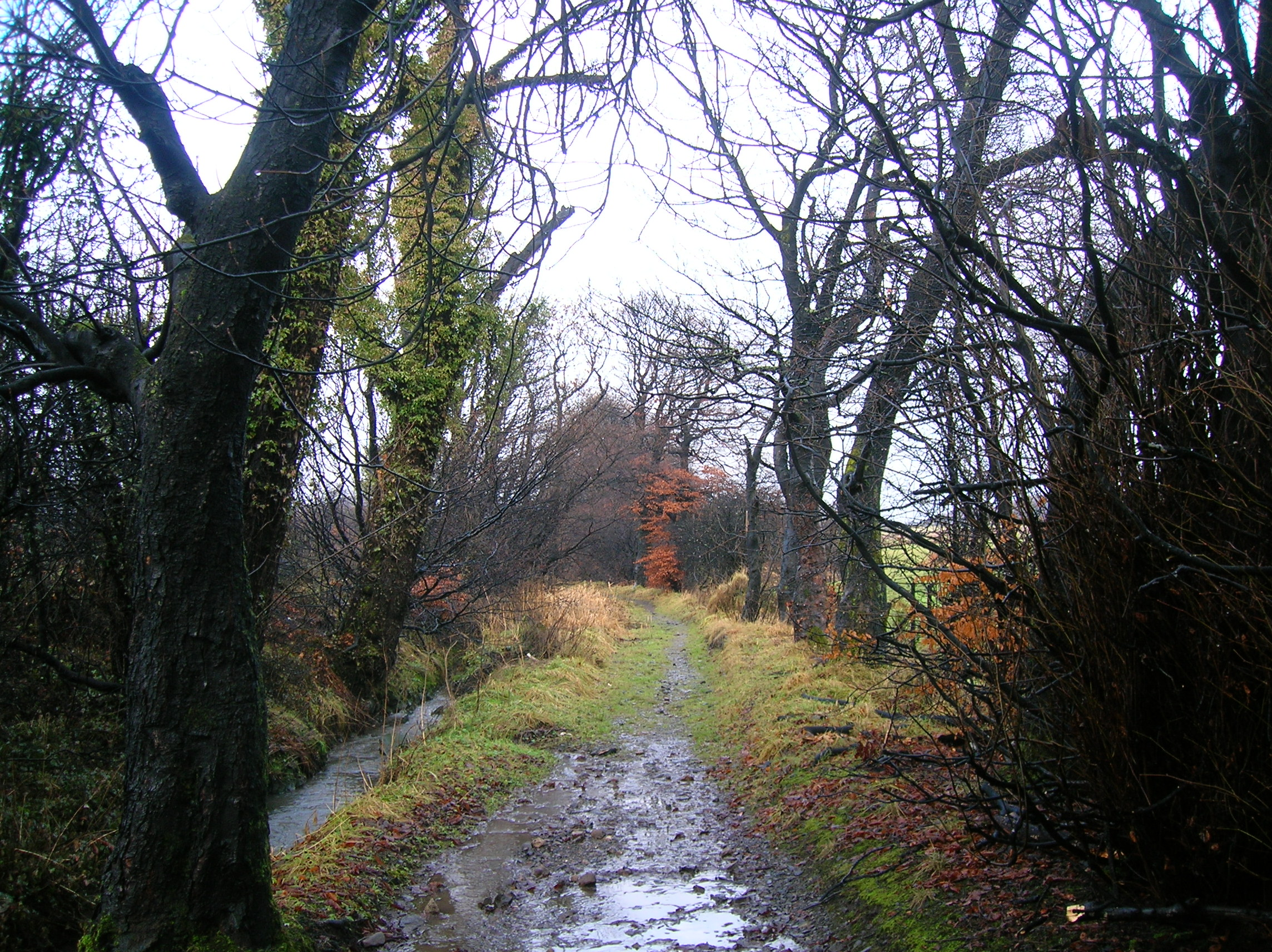
The Mains Burn and lane near the old Mains House

In 1896 the farm steading, Willowyard Mains and later 'Main-Neil' was detached from the mansion house and formed three sides of a square. It was connected however by the high garden wall. In 1891 the dairy accommodation was enlarged and other improvements made, water also being piped in from springs at Morishil.

The lands named 'Mains' became divided up into 'Mains-Neil' as stated above and also 'Mains-Houston', and 'Mains-Marshal'. Robertson records that Mains-Hamilton was recently (1820) converted into a good looking house by Mr. Dun, however it passed to a Mr. Houston. A farmhouse is shown marked as Mains-Hamilton on the OS map of 1856 together with an L-plan outbuilding, which may now form part of the former coachhouse at 'The Meadows' on Arran Crescent. The farmhouse was demolished and the villa built on the site, perhaps utilising the existing whinstone. Blaeu's map of Timothy Pont's survey of circa 1600 marks the properties of Mains-Mure, Mainshill, and Mains-Neil, with Mains-Mure as a castleatted tower house.

The 1911 OS map refers to Mains Lodge as 'Muir Lodge' after William Muir who built Mains House. The Muir family owned the Bath Lane Tannery, near the Beith Health centre of today (2011) and built the Bark Mill. William Muir of Mains joined John Muir and Sons, Tanners, Curriers, and Fancy Leather Manufacturers as a partner in 1846. Laigh Mains, also demolished, was the home farm of Mains House. Dr McCusker, a GP based in Glasgow, owned Mains House at the time of WW2, followed by Mr Dewar, prior to its purchase and demolition.

Mid Road used to cross the Bath Burn by a ford near Mains House and then ran up to the town; the road has now been abandoned and is only used by intrepid walkers.

=== Willowyard Industrial Estate ===
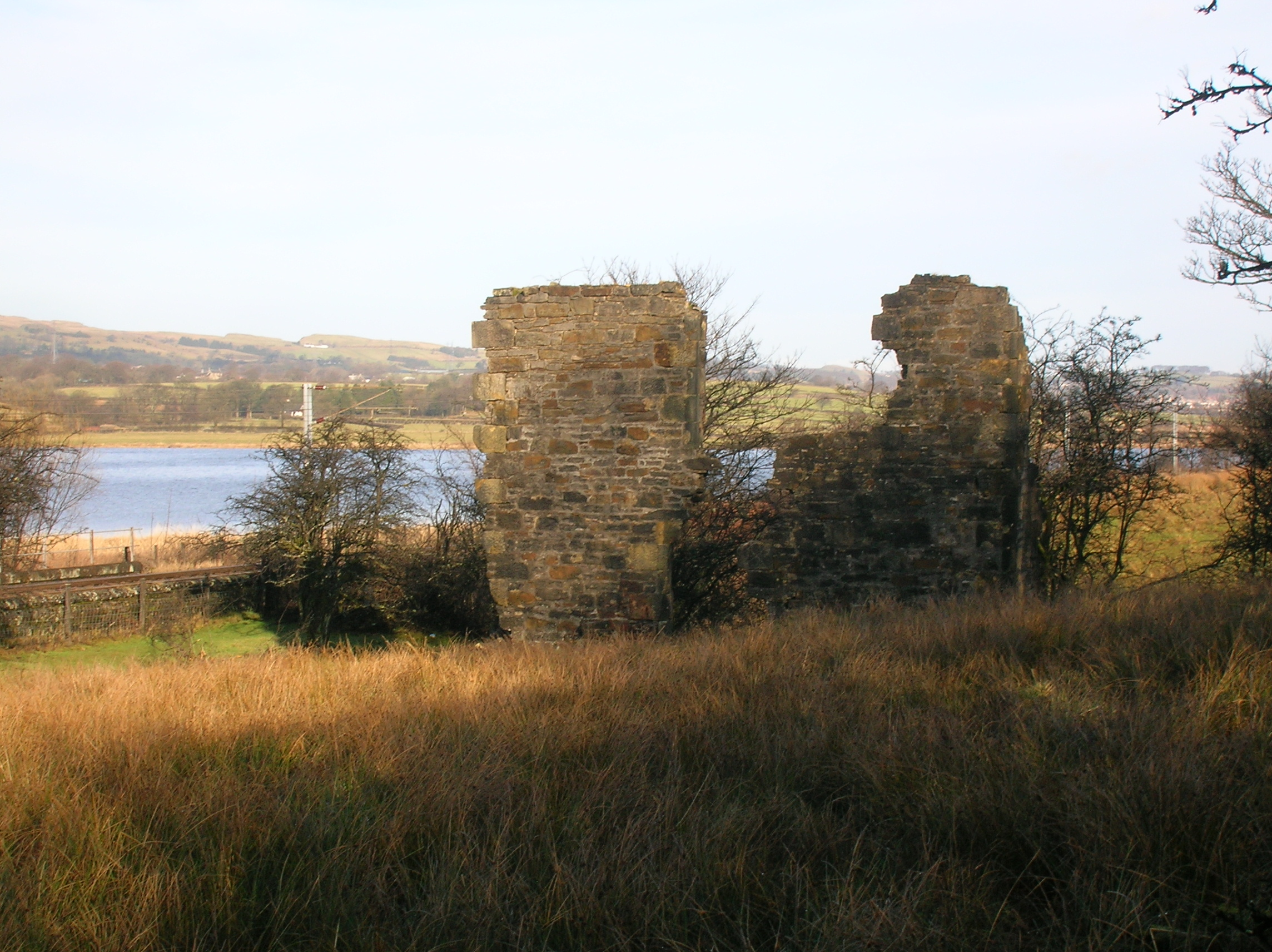
Ruins of the old Bark Mill

The Willowyard Industrial Estate is situated between Kilbirnie loch and the town of Beith. Whisky Bonds were established here by Ballantyne Whisky Company in 1968, following the disaster of the Cheapside Street Whisky Bond Fire. Engraved stones with the initials of Mr and Mrs Muir on the Mains House and these were saved when Mains House was demolished circa 1975 and now form part of a garden within the grounds of the bonded area.

As stated, Willowyard House still stands, converted into offices serving a heat transfer manufacturing company, Chemtec UK Ltd., which is a subsidiary of Armstrong-Chemtec Group. The main railway line from Ayr to Glasgow runs below the industrial estate and forms the eastern margin of the loch in places.

== Bark Mill ==
An unusual industrial centre, a Bark Mill, most likely built by the Muirs of Mains House and powered by the combined Mains and Bath Burns existed on the old lands of Willowyard. The mill produced fine ground oak bark for use in the Beith tanneries using bark from the old oak trees that once forested the loch side. Later the mill became a furniture factory run by Matthew Pollock who applied the use of machinery to help with the manufacture of furniture in 1858. The site was isolated and inconvenient for the workers and was eventually sold to Robert Balfour.

== Micro-history ==
The first wheeled horse-cart in the parish was used at Willowyard circa 1750.
