= Old Lauder Castle =

Castle in Scotland

- Lauder, Scottish Borders, Scotland

Site information
- Condition: No remains

Site history
- Built: c.11th century

Old Lauder Castle was an 11th-century castle located in Lauder, Scottish Borders, Scotland.

== History ==
Hugh de Morville was appointed to the office of Constable of Scotland in 1138, as well gifted the Lordship of the Regality of Lauderdale, with the castle at Lauder, amongst other land and title grants, by King David I of Scotland.

His son Richard de Morville held the castle against King Henry II of England during the revolt of 1173–1174.

The castle may have been in a ruinous state during the First War of Scottish Independence as King Edward I of England, built a fort at Lauder, in the late 13th century.

== Bibliography ==
- Ritchie, R.L. Graeme (1954). The Normans in Scotland. Edinburgh: Edinburgh University Press.
- Rolls Series. Germany: Longman, Brown, Green, Longmans and Roberts. 1873.
