= Kilwinning Abbey =

Monastery in North Ayrshire, Scotland

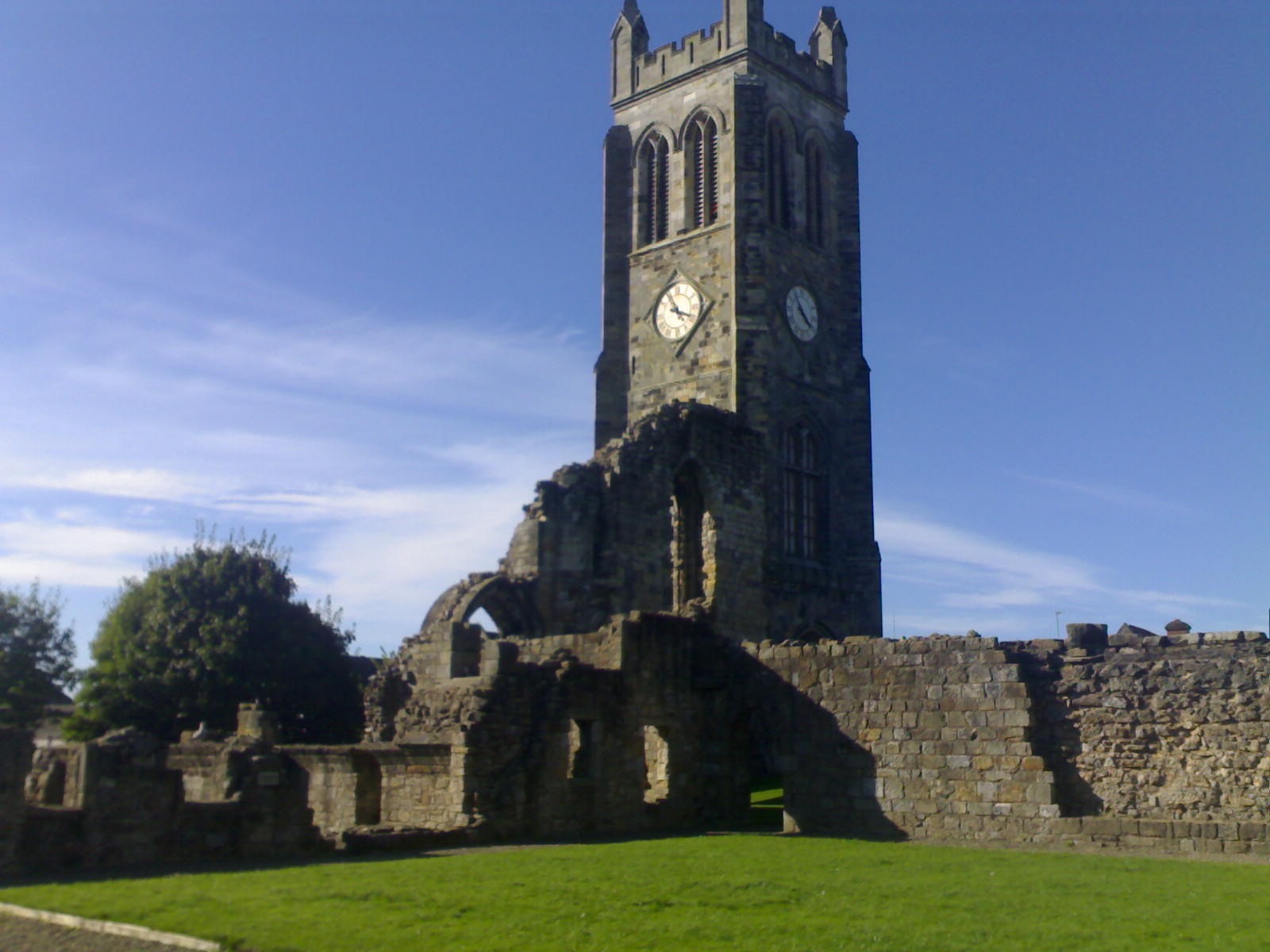
- Interactive map of Kilwinning Abbey

Monastery information
- Order: Tironensian
- Established: circa 1162 - 1168
- Disestablished: 1592
- Mother house: Kelso Abbey

People
- Founder: Richard de Morville

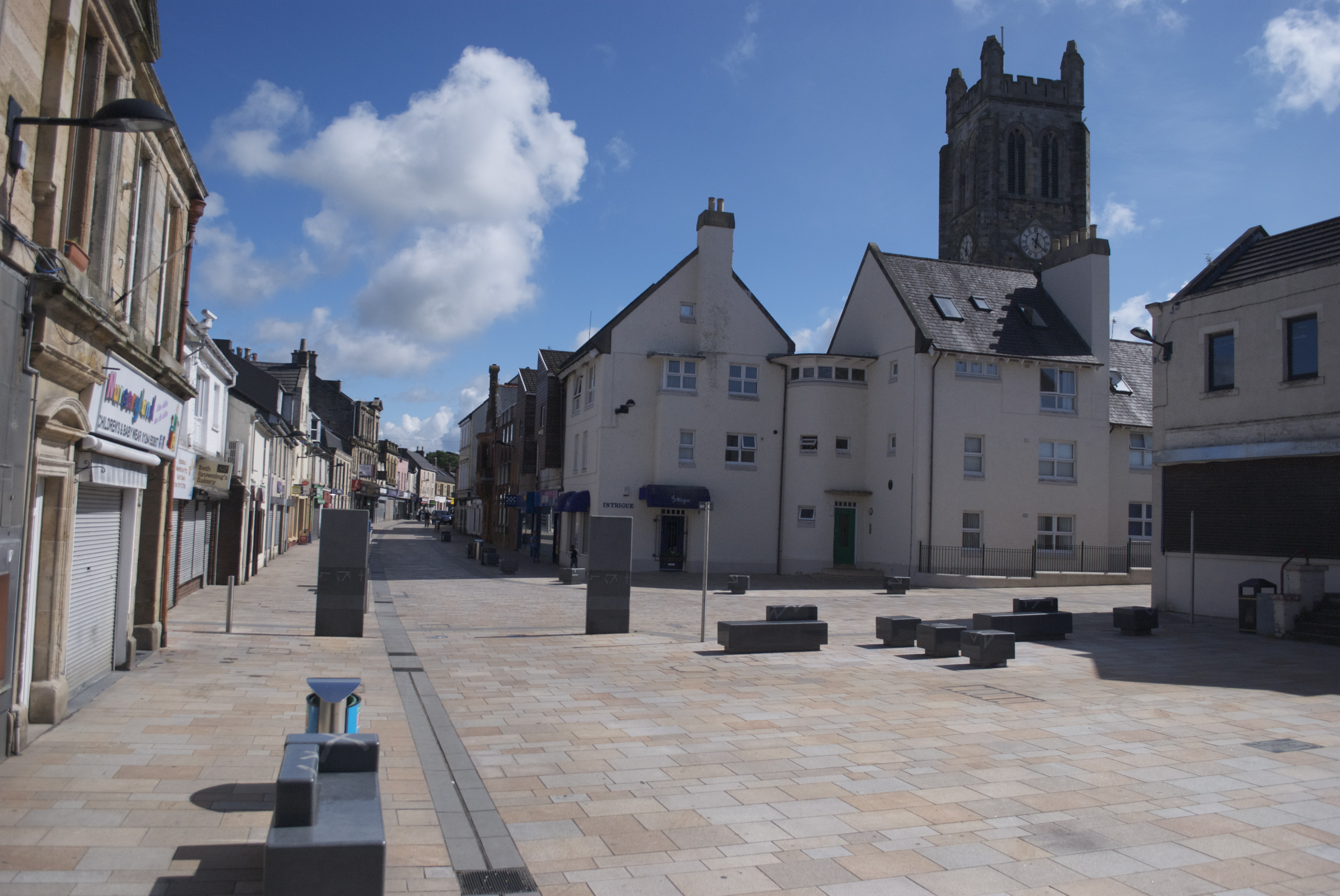
Kilwinning's Main Street on a Sunday, shortly before a papingo shoot to be held at the Abbey tower to the right of the view.

Kilwinning Abbey is a ruined abbey located in the centre of the town of Kilwinning, North Ayrshire, Scotland.

== History ==
=== Establishment of the Abbey ===
Kilwinning was a Tironensian Benedictine monastic community, named after Tiron in the diocese of Chartres. The abbey was dedicated to Saint Winning and the Virgin Mary, and founded sometime between 1162 and 1188 with monks coming from Kelso. The patron is not known for certain, but it may have been Richard de Morville, Lord of Cunninghame and Great Constable of Scotland, perhaps with the backing and assistance of King William of Scotland. A story developed that another Sir Richard de Morville who was involved in the murder of Thomas Becket was the founder of the abbey, however despite the likelihood of the families being the same, the dates of the events make this connection impossible. A connection that does exist is the founding of Arbroath Abbey in 1178, also a Tironensian abbey, in memory of Becket by William the Lion (1165–1214).

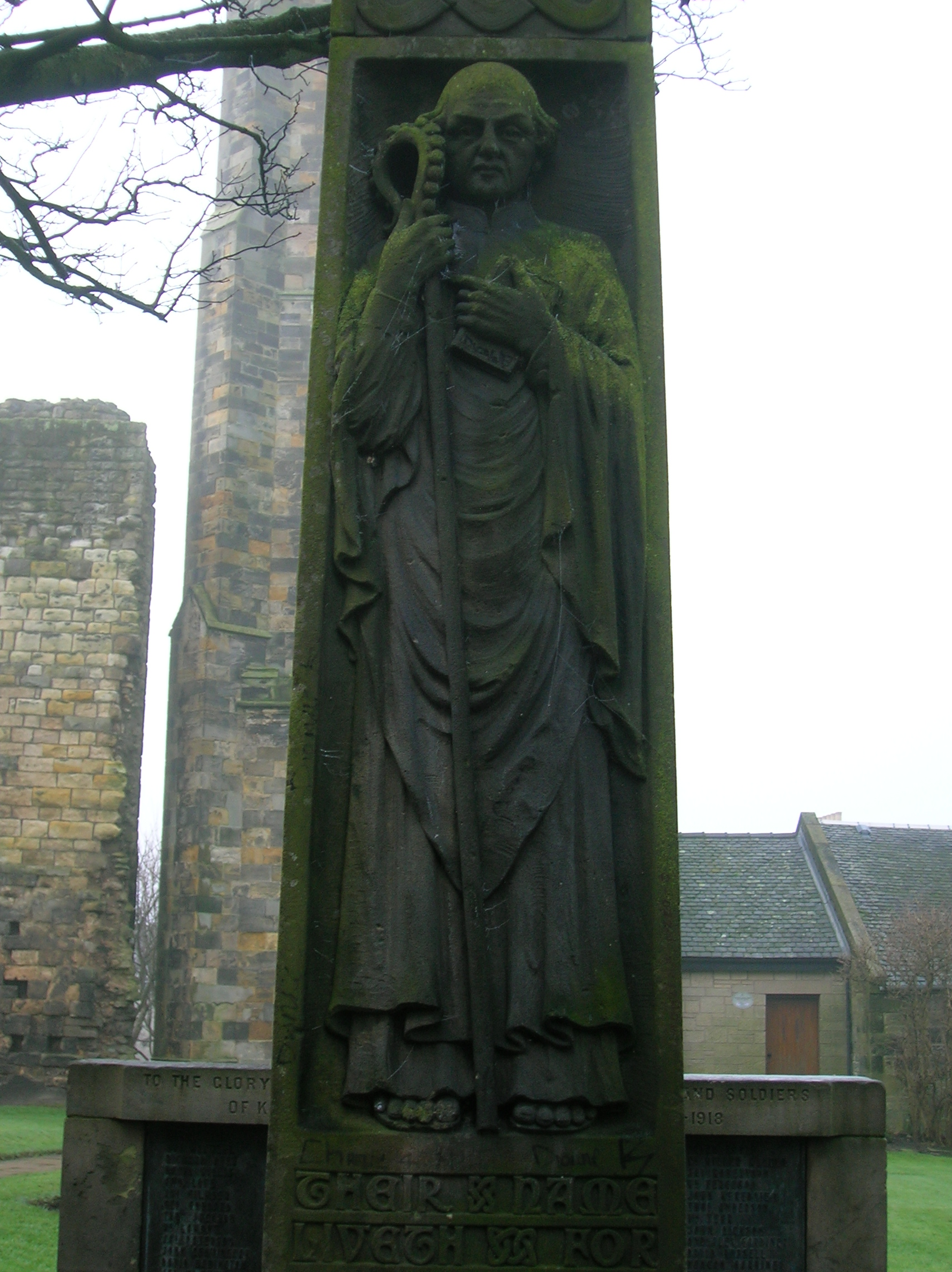
Saint Winning

The abbey, located far away in the west at a distance from the core of Lowland Scotland, is not very well recorded, and few of its records have come down to posterity as the chartulary has been destroyed or lost. In 1571 the records are said to have been carried away by "a furious horseman", following an attack upon the abbey. In 1591 William Melville took legal action against Jean Blair or Cunninghame, widow of Alexander Cunninghame to force the return of the records, but they were not forthcoming. Timothy Pont in the 17th century claimed to have studied the abbey's chartulary, possibly at Eglinton Castle; certainly the seal of the monastery was preserved at the castle. At the beginning of the 17th century they had been seen in the possession of the Earl of Eglinton until they were loaned to the Ayrshire and Galloway Archaeological Society who were preparing a publication that was never published.

It is significant that Kilwinning Abbey was not founded by a monarch and its beginnings were accordingly less grand than would have otherwise been the case.

An early legend tells of Saint Winning sending his monks to fish in the River Garnock, however no matter how hard they tried or how long they persevered they could catch nothing. The saint in response placed a curse on the river, preventing it from ever having fish in its waters; according to legend, the river responded by changing course and thereby avoiding the curse. It is clear that the river has substantially changed its course in recorded history, previously having entered the sea at Stevenston, Ardeer therefore being an island at that time. Blaeu's map printed in 1654 shows this.

The area of Kilwinning on the East bank of the River Garnock is still known as Corsehill in memory of the cross that used to be placed there to welcome pilgrims visiting Saint Winning's shrine and as a place for prayer.

The historian John Smith records that Corsehillmuir was the site of the ecclesiastical execution by burning of witches in the 17th century, and the hanging of other types of condemned criminals from the barony. Corsehillmuir also have been the site of the old churchyard of Segdoune or Kilwinning.

King Robert II granted the abbey a charter, erecting all the lands of the Barony of Kilwinning into a free regality, with full jurisdiction. They received ratifications of this charter from Robert III and James IV. King James IV visited the abbey in 1507, making an offering of 14s. to its relics.

The abbot was the ecclesiastical baron of the baronies held by the abbey and this gave the rights of 'pit and gallows', the right to hold baronial courts and other duties. The 'Court Hill' at Gateside, North Ayrshire was the 'caput' for the Barony of Beith held by the abbots. A site at Bridgend near the Segdon Inn may have been the location of the 'Court Hill' of Kilwinning.

=== Abbots and commendators ===
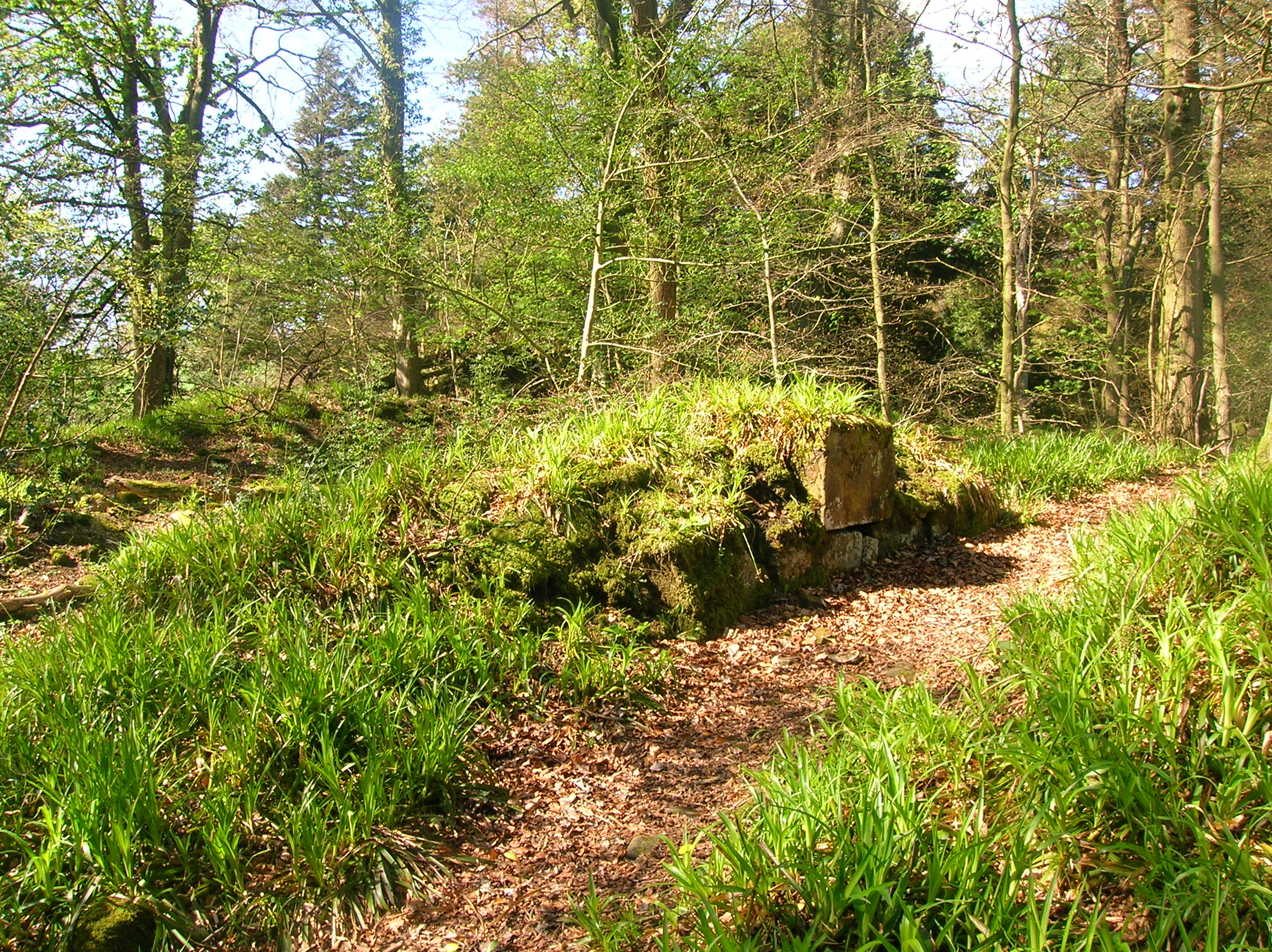
The entrance to the ruins of Montgreenan Castle, the 'Bishop's Palace'

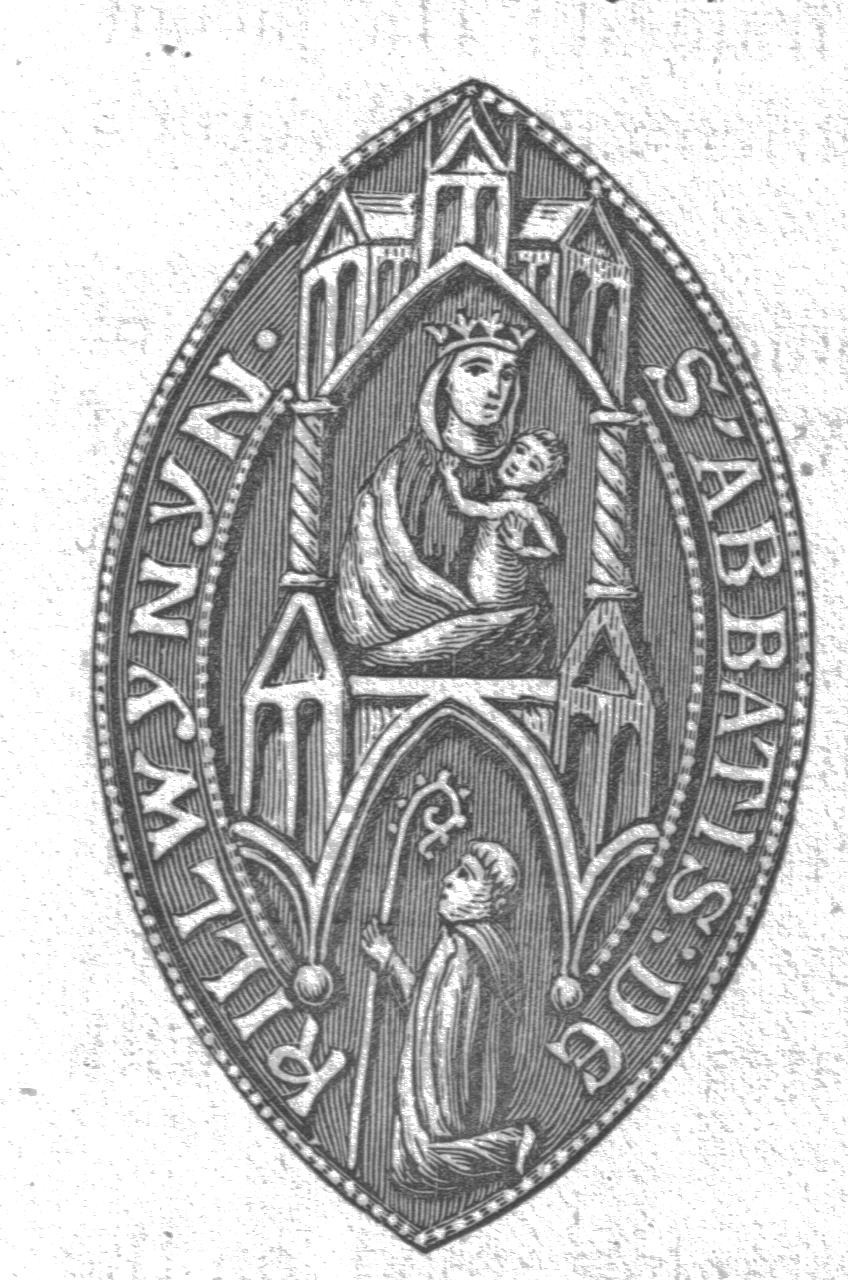
The Abbot's seal

The list of the Kilwinning abbots starts with Rainer, 1190; Nigellus, 1201–10; John, 1214–26; William, 1280; Bernard, 1296-1307; William Daunant, 1335; William de Deyn, 1344; John of Dalgarno, 1344–67; Robert, 1361–70; John, 1383–84; Roger, 1400-1408; Adam Spark, 1407–39; William Boyd, 1443–74; William Bunsh or Bunche, 1474–1513, killed at the Battle of Flodden; John Foreman, 1512–13; James Beaton, 1513–26; Alexander Hamilton, 1527–45; Henry Sinclair, 1545–50; Gavin Hamilton, 1550-71.

The commendators in theory held the lands and properties in the usually temporary absence of abbots, however the reality of the Reformation effectively terminated such arrangements and the aristocracy 'fought over' the opportunity to acquire revenues, lands and properties. The 'roasting of the Commendator' of Crossraguel Abbey at Dunure Castle in 1570 by Gilbert Kennedy, 4th Earl of Cassilis is a case in point.

Metcalfe records that in 1552, Hugh, third Earl of Eglinton, was made Commendator of the monastery, and had the office of chamberlain, justiciary, and bailie of all the lands belonging to that monastery. Dobie's list starts with Alexander Cunninghame, 1571–91; William Melville, 1591–1615; John Spottiswood, 1615-1639; Andrew, Bishop of Argyll, 1621. After these times of unsettled religious conditions the lands passed back to the Earls of Eglinton following his purchase of the lands, offices, and rights.

In about 1470 James III granted the right to the Abbots of Kilwinning to hold Chamberlain Courts on one privileged acre of land between the Corsehill Burn and Bridgend.

The Abbots of Kilwinning held a townhouse in Glasgow in the Drygate.

=== Revenues ===
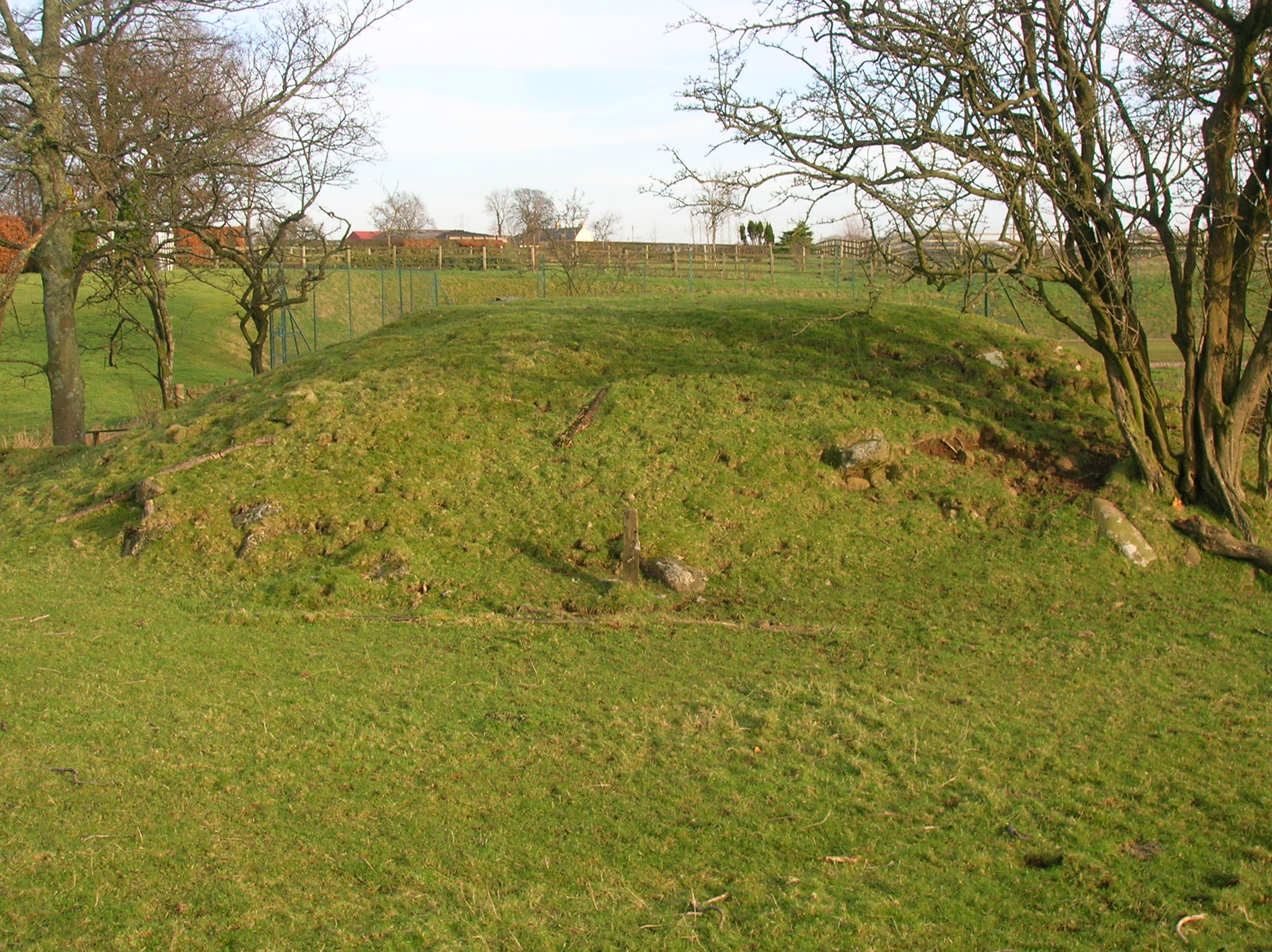
The Court Hill of the Abbots of Kilwinning near Beith

In addition to churches within Kilwinning, the abbey had revenues from thirteen other parish churches in Cunninghame, giving sixteen in all. The abbey also held lands at Monkcastle and Monkredding. Monkcastle served as the country residence of the abbots. In the reign of Robert III, Sir William Cunninghame of Kilmaurs gave the lands of Grange in Kilmarnock to the monks. John de Menteth, Lord of Annan and Knapdale gave the monks the right of patronage to the churches of Saint Mary and Saint Bridget on Arran in 1337. The chapel of Saint Bridget also covered the lands at Portencross and West Kilbride, which was established as a separate Parish in 1567.

The monks held Granges, such as the one at Beith, given to the abbey by Sir William de Cunninghame and those of Craignaught. This ownership involved the monks in extensive agricultural activities. Details of the rents from farms show a considerable annual production of cheese in particular, 268 in one year alone. The monks may also have been involved in the mining of coal, especially for the production of sea salt from saltpans at places such as Saltcoats.

Kilwinning Abbey ruins in the 19th century

The Barony of Beith had been given to the Kilwinning monks by Richard de Morville's wife towards the end of the 12th century. The monks court hill as ecclesiastical barons, is still in existence and the abbey's farm or Grange was at Grangehill. Local legend has it that Kerelaw Castle was a palace of the abbots of Kilwinning.

Such a wealthy establishment was a great attraction to the aristocracy and it is recorded that the Earls of Glencairn and Angus joined forces as early as 1512, entered the abbey precincts, and tried to physically force Abbot William Bunche (Bunsh) to resign in favour of the preceptor of Glasgow, John Forman.

The revenues of the abbey were calculated in the 1860s as being then equivalent to £20,000, or well over 2 million in modern terms (2008), being derived a variety of sources, including the Parishes and churches of Irvine, Kilmarnock, Loudoun Kirk, Dalry, Ardrossan, Kilbirnie, West Kilbride, Dunlop, Stevenston, Beith, Dreghorn, Dumbarton, South and North Knapdale, Kilmory and Kilbride. In the 1540s the abbey had seventeen monks. In the case of Loudoun Kirk, James, son of Lambinus, established the church before 1189. James, a member of a Flemish family, at or soon after its foundation, gave the revenues of Loudoun Kirk, to support the monks of the then newly founded Kilwinning Abbey, and in return a priest (curate) was provided to attend to the spiritual needs of the parishioners.

The practice at one time of assigning the revenues of parishes to middlemen, who paid a fixed sum to the abbot, was the cause of much disagreement and dissatisfaction. These middle or tacksmen were free to obtain what monies they could for their own benefit.

The abbots held a town house in Irvine known as Lople on the High Street and another adjacent property.

In 1566 the last Roman Catholic vicar of Dunlop, John Houston, with the permission of Gavin Hamilton, commendator of Kilwinning Abbey, granted the church lands of Dunlop to William Cunninghame of Aiket. He kept an acre of land at the manse for his use and for the use of his successors.

=== Destruction of the abbey ===
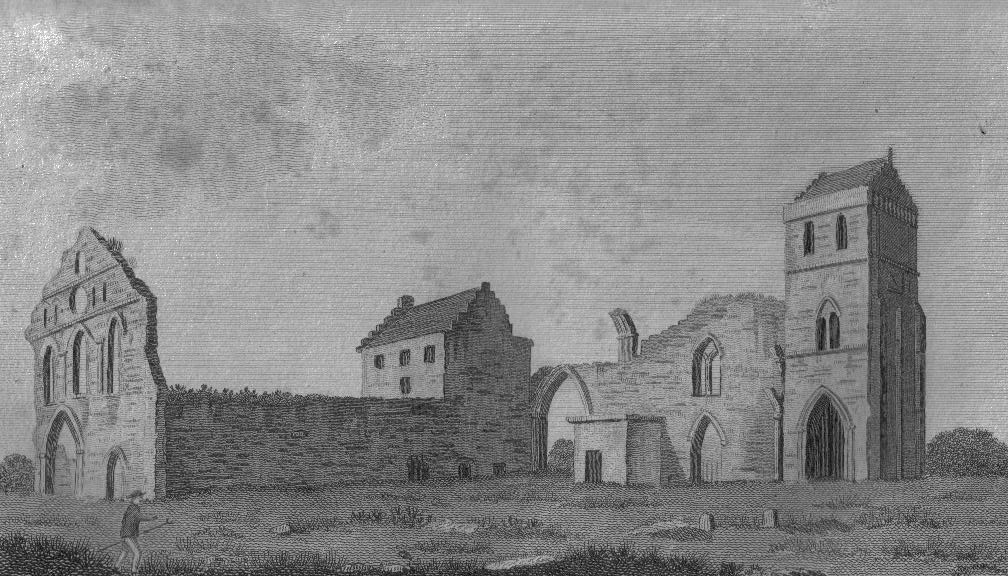
Kilwinning Abbey ruins in 1789

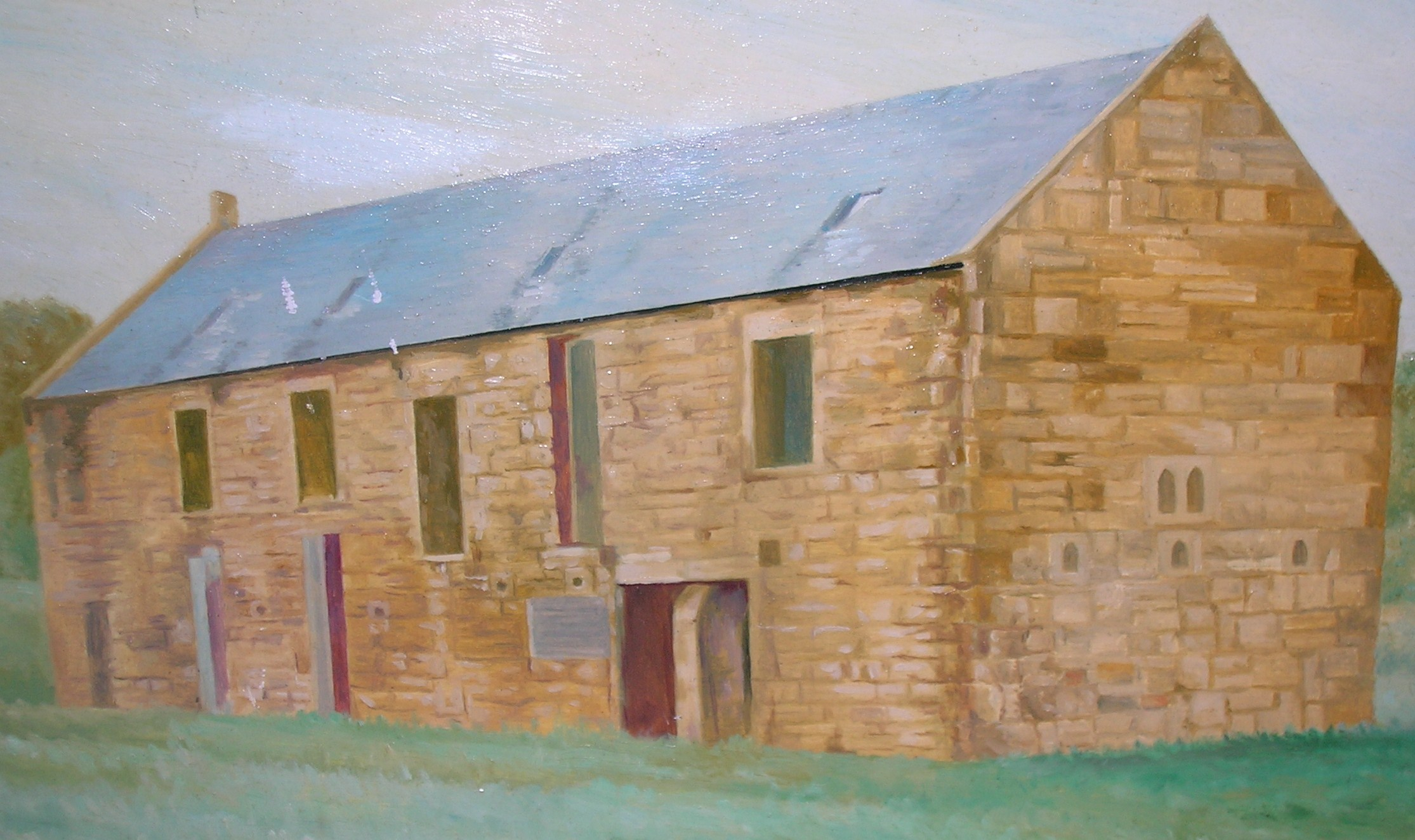
The Oxenward Barn, constructed from abbey stone, but long since demolished

The Earls of Glencairn and Angus had plundered the abbey in 1513 and George Wishart's supporters did some damage in the 1540s. However still more determined action was in 1559, when the Earl of Glencairn led a raid on the abbey during which pictures, statues, books, vestments, and all other images were said to have been taken to the Abbey Green and burned. In 1562, Alexander, Earl of Glencairn is believed to have assaulted the abbey, supposedly at the instigation of John Knox and the Scottish Protestant Reformation; Knox's 'battle cry' being Pull down the nests and the rooks will fly away. It is said that ornamental tombs were broken up and some graves dug up; stained glass windows were broken up, especially those bearing the images of the Virgin Mary or saints. In Kilwinning as elsewhere, the local aristocracy no doubt exploited the situation to grab as much of the church's property and land as possible, something that had in fact been happening before the Reformation, as indicated by the plundering of 1513.

Knox may have referred to the 'casting down' of abbeys etc, but this did not mean that they were physically destroyed, merely overthrown, as the reformers needed some of them as parish churches, though some of them were certainly vandalised as Kilwinning may well have been. However Kilwinning Abbey, like other pre-Reformation religious houses did not fall into ruin due to the actions of the Reformers. Those that had not already been destroyed by English armies fell into ruin simply because they no longer had the revenues and rents to support them from their wider lands. The required buildings were now only parish churches and small parishes, like Kilwinning, could not afford to maintain such large properties. Wind and weather did most of the damage thereafter, though much of Kilwinning Abbey was still standing by the time Timothy Pont visited Scotland in the early 17th century. The structure of this monastery," says Pont, "was solid and grate, all of freestone cutte, the church fair and staitly after ye modell of yat of Glasgow, with a fair steiple of 7 score foote of height, yet standing quhen I myselve did see it."

Pont gives the date of major destruction as 1591, thirty years after the Reformation. This rather suggests that the abbey was demolished in several phases, now partly driven by the practical need for building materials. Once the abbey started to crumble, it became the local quarry, especially for the Montgomeries of Eglinton. Substantial amounts of stone are believed to have been removed between 1561 and 1591. Hay and corn, recently brought in from the fields, were used to stoke the fire which may have destroyed parts of the abbey. According to legend, one monk is said to have cursed the men who were despoiling the abbey and calling upon Saint Winnin to save his abbey the saint's statue toppled over and killed three of the Earl's men.

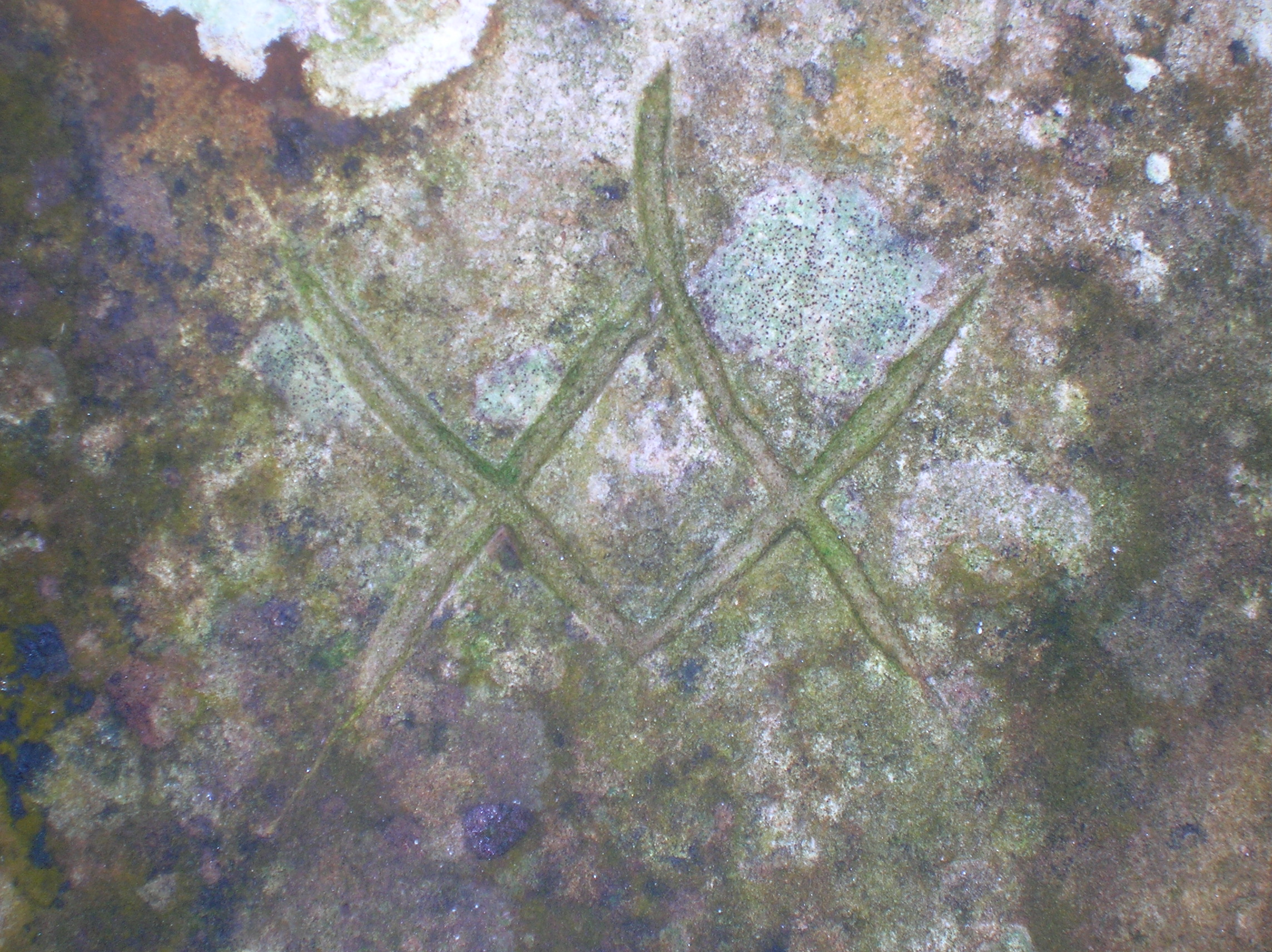
A Mason's Mark on a stone from the old deer park wall, suggesting that the stones came from old Kilwinning Abbey

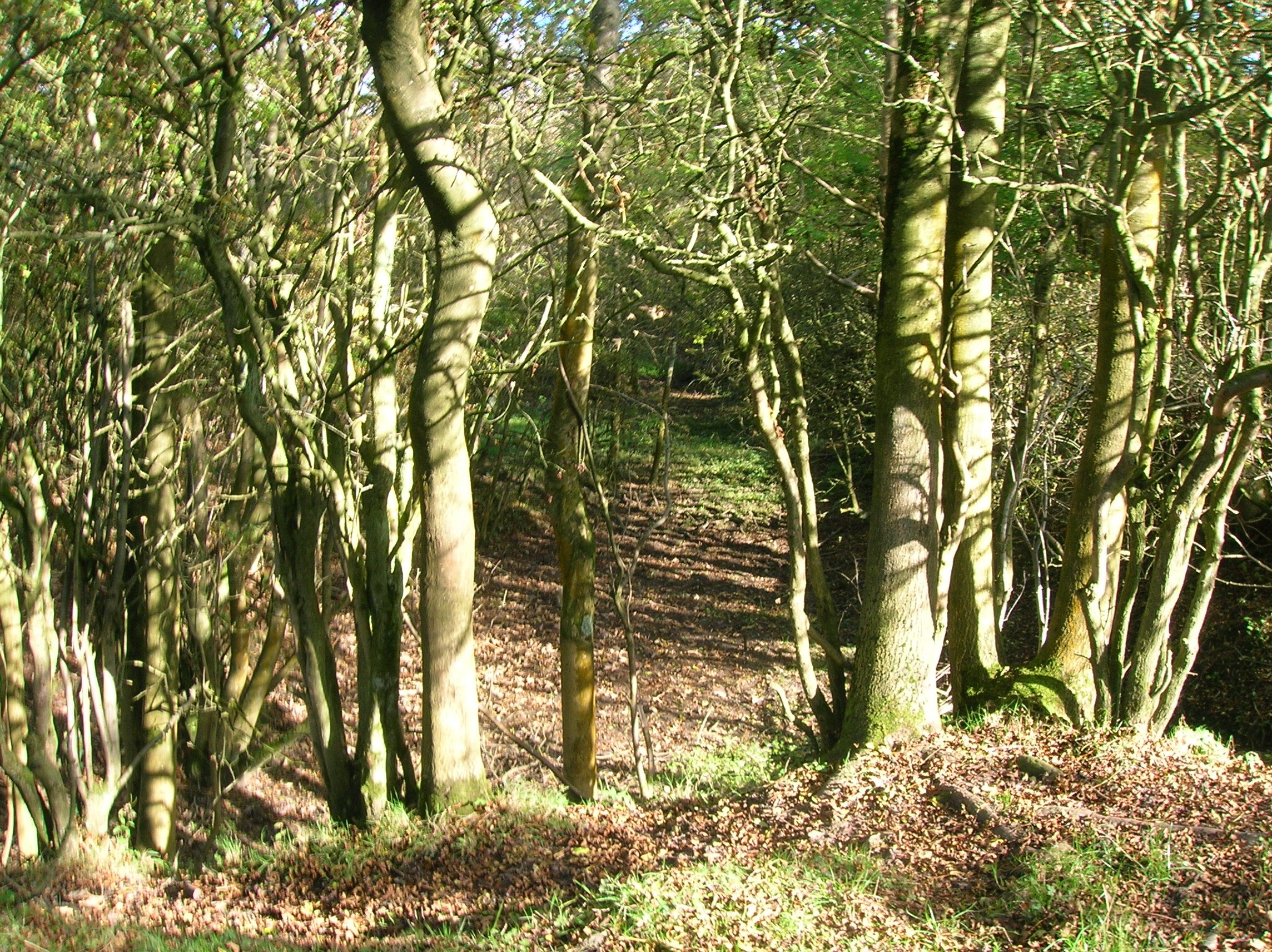
The site of Goldcraigs freestone quarry, a source of the abbey building stone.

In the 16th century the abbey had been gradually secularised and protestantised; the last abbot, Archbishop Gavin Hamilton of Roplock, died at Restalrig, outside Edinburgh on 'Black Saturday, 15 June 1571, following a skirmish between the parties supporting the Queen and the opposing Protestant faction under the Earl of Morton. Although he supported the Reformation, he was also a supporter of Mary Queen of Scots.

Alexander Cunninghame, the third son of the Earl of Glencairn, became the Commendator of Kilwinning Abbey. He refused to pay the stipend of the parish ministers in 1581 from the old abbey's revenues and was declared an outlaw for his refusal to recognise his obligations. He had also passed the valuable lands of Montgreenan to his son, also Alexander.

Alexander, the elder, was shot and killed at his 'palace' gate of Montgreenan by Sir Robert Montgomerie of Skelmorlie on 1 August 1586, as a direct result of the assassination of the Fourth Earl of Eglinton at Lainshaw, Stewarton, in April of that year, an act that he was thought to have had a hand in. His post as commendator, was taken that same day by William Melville of Raith. This was disputed, but confirmed in 1592 by Parliament and finally Melville resigned all of the lands and properties to the Crown.

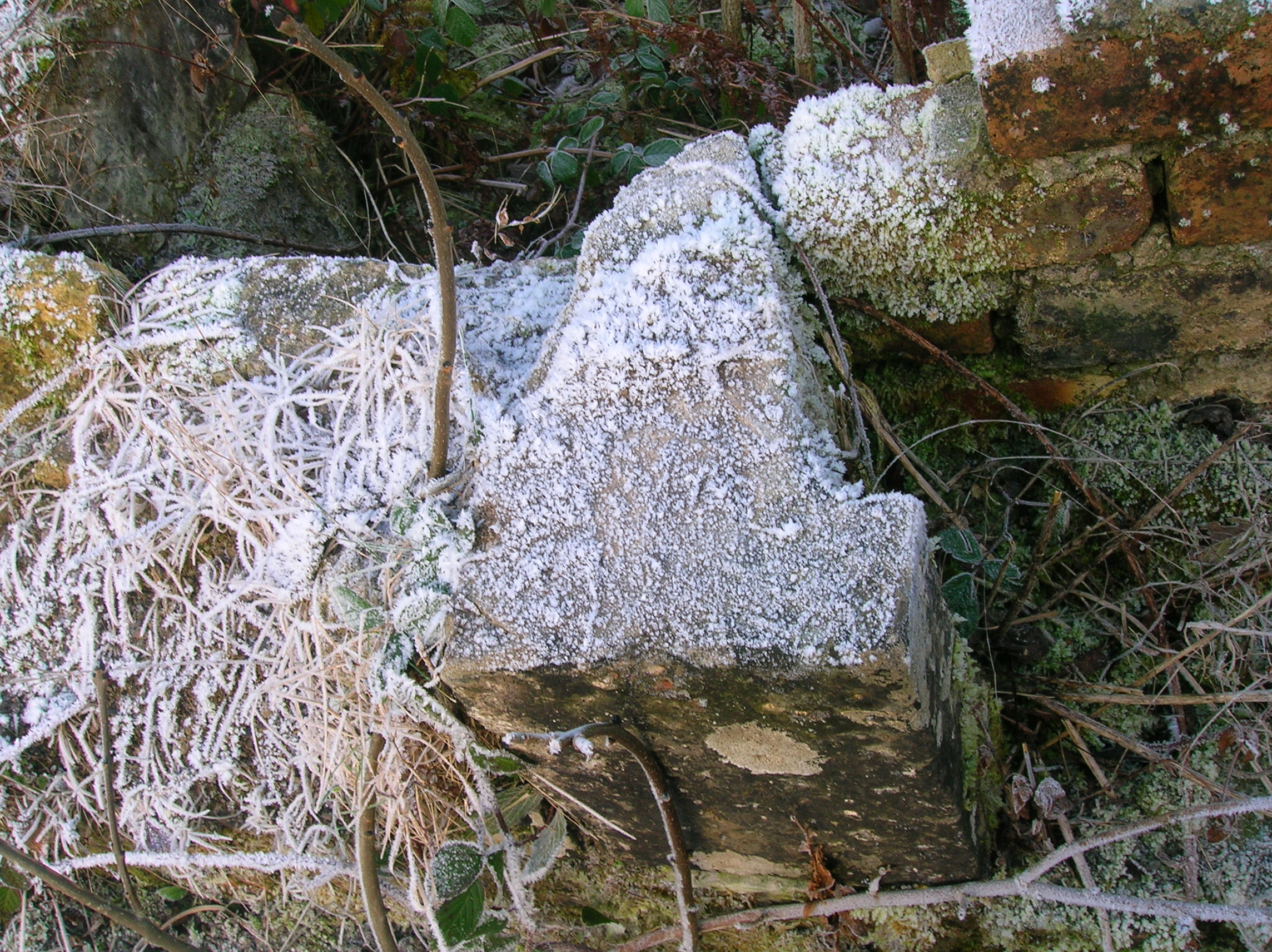
Stonework from the abbey reused in an Eglinton Estate building at Benslie

In 1592 the commendary had been transformed into a free barony for William Melville, brother of Andrew Melville. In 1603 Melville sold the lands and rights of office to Hugh, 5th Earl of Eglinton. This was confirmed when the earl obtained, on 5 January, a Charter under the Great Seal which invested him with these lands and titles of Kilwinning Abbey and its 16 associated parish churches.

A legend tells of Saint Winning sending his monks to fish in the River Garnock, however no matter how hard they tried or how long they persevered they could catch nothing. Saint Winning in response to the river's perversity placed a curse on the river, preventing it from ever having fish in its waters; the river responded by changing course and thereby avoiding the curse. It is clear that the river has substantially changed its course in recorded history, previously having entered the sea at Stevenston.

=== Ardeer Legend ===
The author John Service relates a story of the murder of the Earl of Eglinton's wife on Ardeer by Nigellus, the Abbott of Kilwinning Abbey in the 16th century. Pilgrims came to Kilwinning Abbey partly because of the miracles that were performed there and the Earl of Eglinton, a follower of John Knox, strongly voiced his disbelief and also stated that he would stop paying tithes to the monks. In revenge the abbott arranged for the Countess of Eglinton to be waylaid on her customary journey to Ardrossan by way of Ardeer. The monks took her to a ruined bothy, below which was a stone lined cellar; she was imprisoned here and starved to death. The earl was never able to find her, although her drowned servant was discovered on the beach and tales of the screams of a woman's voice hidden in the crashing of the waves at Ardeer and of a distressed woman who vanished when approached began to spread. After the earl had died the last monk of Kilwinning Abbey is said to have confessed to his part in this awful crime and thereby revealed the truth behind the unexplained disappearance of the Countess of Eglinton.

=== Later use of the abbey buildings and properties ===
After the destruction of the main buildings at Kilwinning Abbey the Garden or Easter Chambers within the boundary walls of the old abbey, previously the dwelling of the Abbot were used by the new owners, the Earls of Eglinton, as a dower house and family dwelling. Lady Mary Montgomerie lived here after the death of her husband in the 17th century and her son may have remained here until he succeeded to the Earldom. Garden and orchards still existed within the old abbey walls.

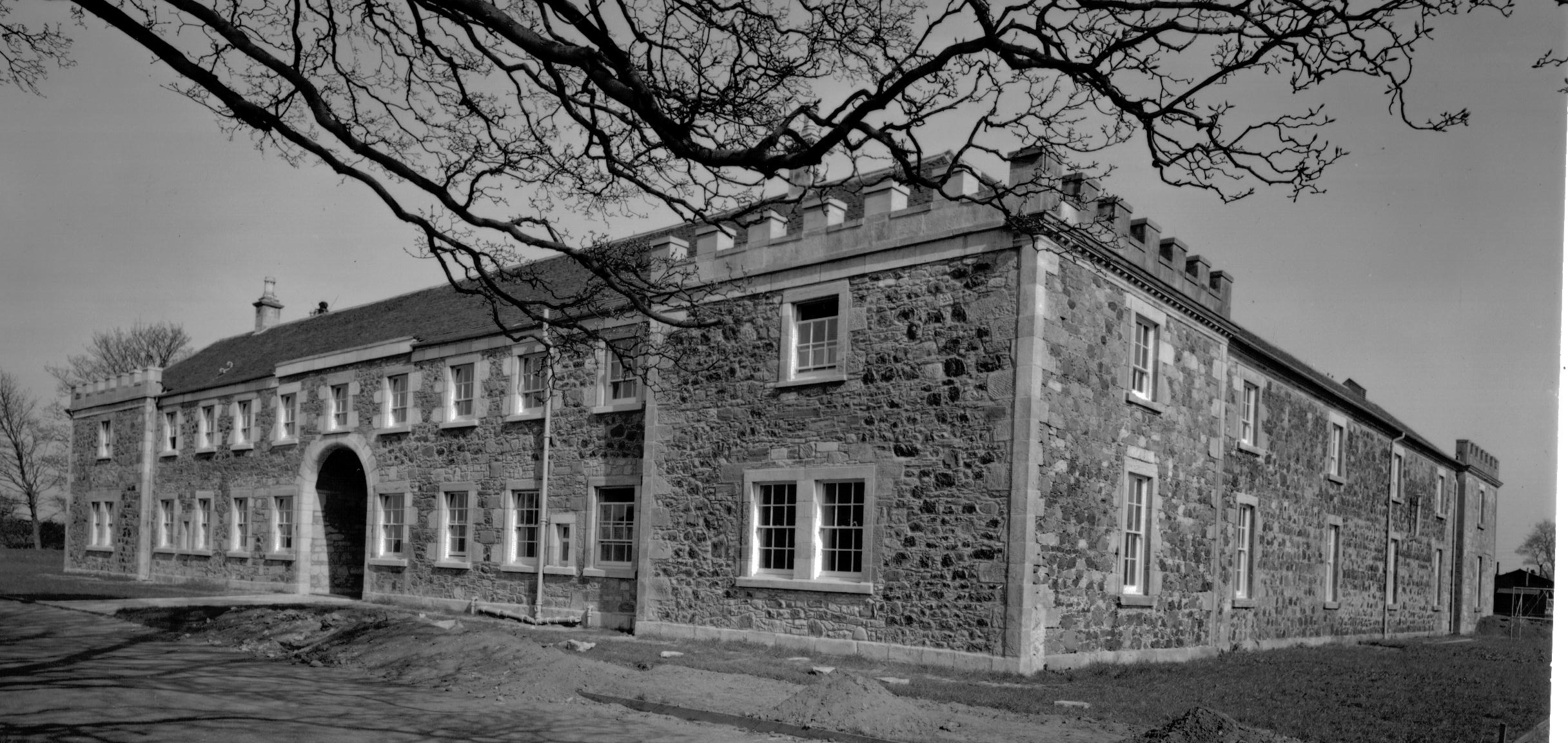
The old estate offices and stables built from the masonry of the old abbot's dwelling

Considerable quantities of abbey stonework were used in the construction of buildings at Eglinton Castle and the deer park wall at Eglinton Castle. The dovecot at Eglinton may have come from the abbey and certainly contains carvings from the abbey. The stables were built from stones taken from the Easter Chambers of Kilwinning Abbey; being the Abbots lodgings and later that of the Earls of Eglinton. In 1784, over a period of four months, the building was demolished and the stones were taken to Eglinton. Some of the dressed stone blocks from which the old stables and offices are constructed have masons marks cut into them, showing their origin to be the old abbey.

Part of the old abbey chancel was at first used as the parish church, however this was later demolished in 1775 and the Earl of Eglinton built a new Abbey church using the stones of the old abbey on the same site. An oddity caused by this re-use is the uneven surface of the external walls. A coat of arms of the conjoined arms of the Eglinton and Campbells of Loudoun, in the persons of Robert Montgomerie and his wife Jean Campbell, is built into the church wall above the staircase that leads up to the Eglinton Loft. They may have been placed there to commemorate the building of the first the construction of the first church of the reformist faith.

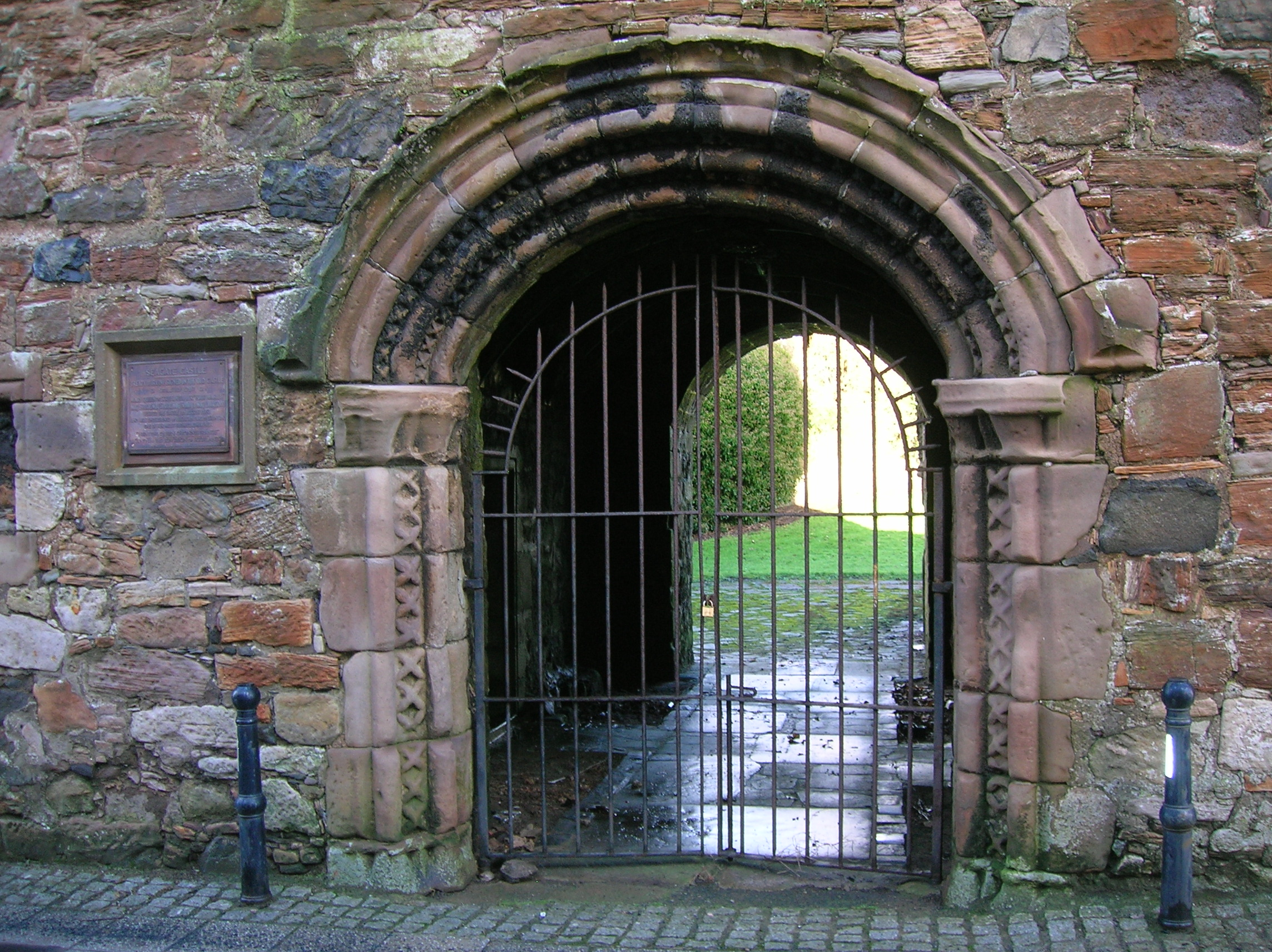
Ornamental entrance doorway

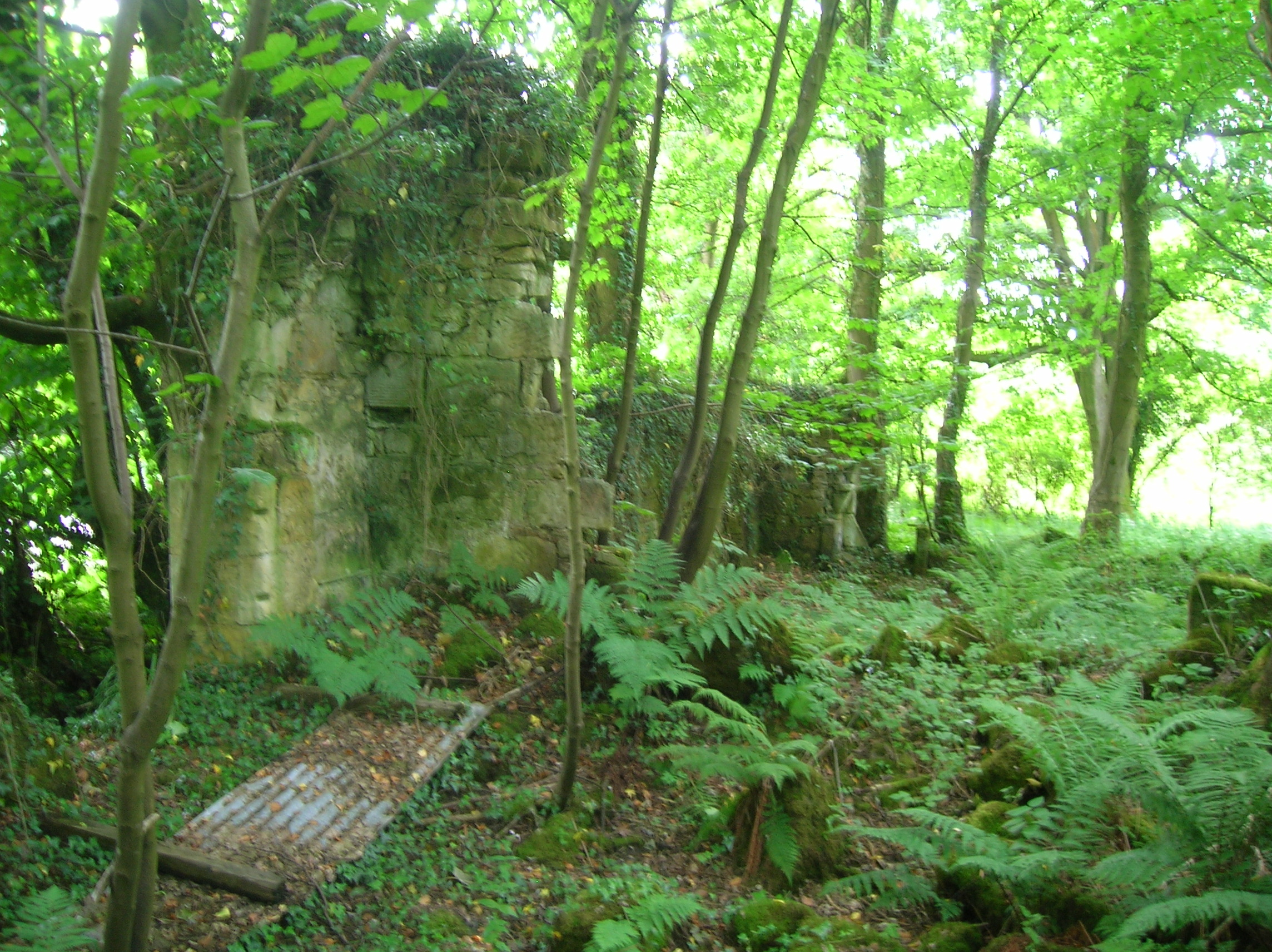
The Lylston Row. Possibly built from the abbey ruins.

Seagate Castle was developed as a town house for the 3rd Earl of Eglinton between 1565 and 1582 and the entrance doorway may have been built from the ruins of Kilwinning Abbey.

Until about two hundred years ago various ranges of vaults beneath the abbey ruins were still partly accessible, but with the rebuilding and extension of the Kilwinning old Parish Church, no access is now possible.

A font, possibly from the abbey is situated within the old village of Dalgarven.

Kerelaw Castle was rebuilt, having been burnt down by the Montgomeries, sometime after 1488 and is reported to have contained a number of carved coats of arms of the Scottish nobility, taken from Kilwinning Abbey.

In 1439 the Abbot of Kilwinning Abbey petitioned the Vatican for permission to build a bridge over the Garnock Water. Abbot Adam's Bridge was sadly demolished in 1765 as recorded in the Glasgow Journal of 18-4-1765 to make way for the present bridge. This replacement bridge was reported in the Ardrossan and Saltcoats Herald of 18-4-1857 as to be widened and strengthened, the work being completed in 1858.

Some parts of the abbey have survived as ruins; later vernacular buildings within the site have been removed and now the ruins serve as a tourist attractions in Kilwinning. The rebuilt tower holds a museum and opens regularly for public access.

Monkcastle near Dalry was the abbot's country retreat and survives as a ruin. Monkredding House was the brother's rest house, the 'Monk's Garden' and survives in a much modified form.

Stones from the abbey buildings were used in the construction of the 'Railway Cottage' at South Millburn near Benslie.

Robert Heron in 1799 recorded that "We crossed the river by a commodious bridge (new in 1765). The walls which surrounded the orchard of the monks, are still partly standing. Various stately fruit-trees yet appear within. Some parts of the buildings which those clergy inhabited, are also standing. The situation was well-chosen."

=== Archaeological evidence ===
The nave and transept were 100 ft across, broader than those of Paisley, Glasgow or St Andrews. The building wasn't especially long and was unique in Scotland in that it had two western towers, not arising from the building, but standing separately, either side, on massive supporting piers. One of these towers fell at a relatively early date, an inherent weakness being present, probably hastened by reformist action.

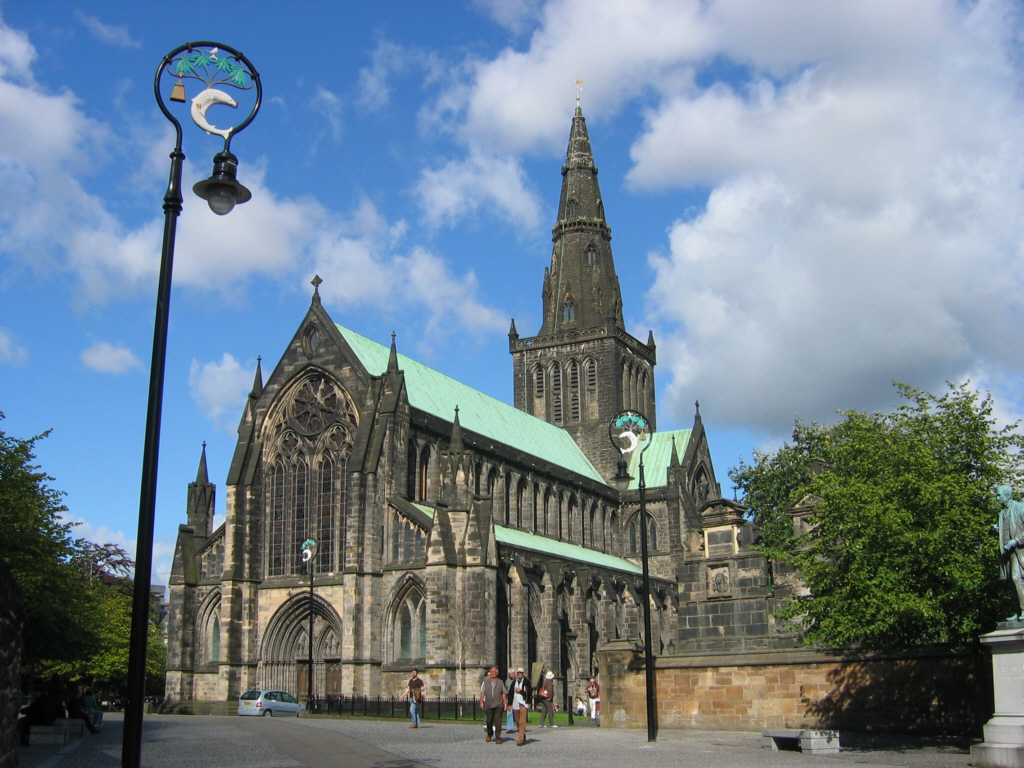
The abbey resembled Glasgow Cathedral.

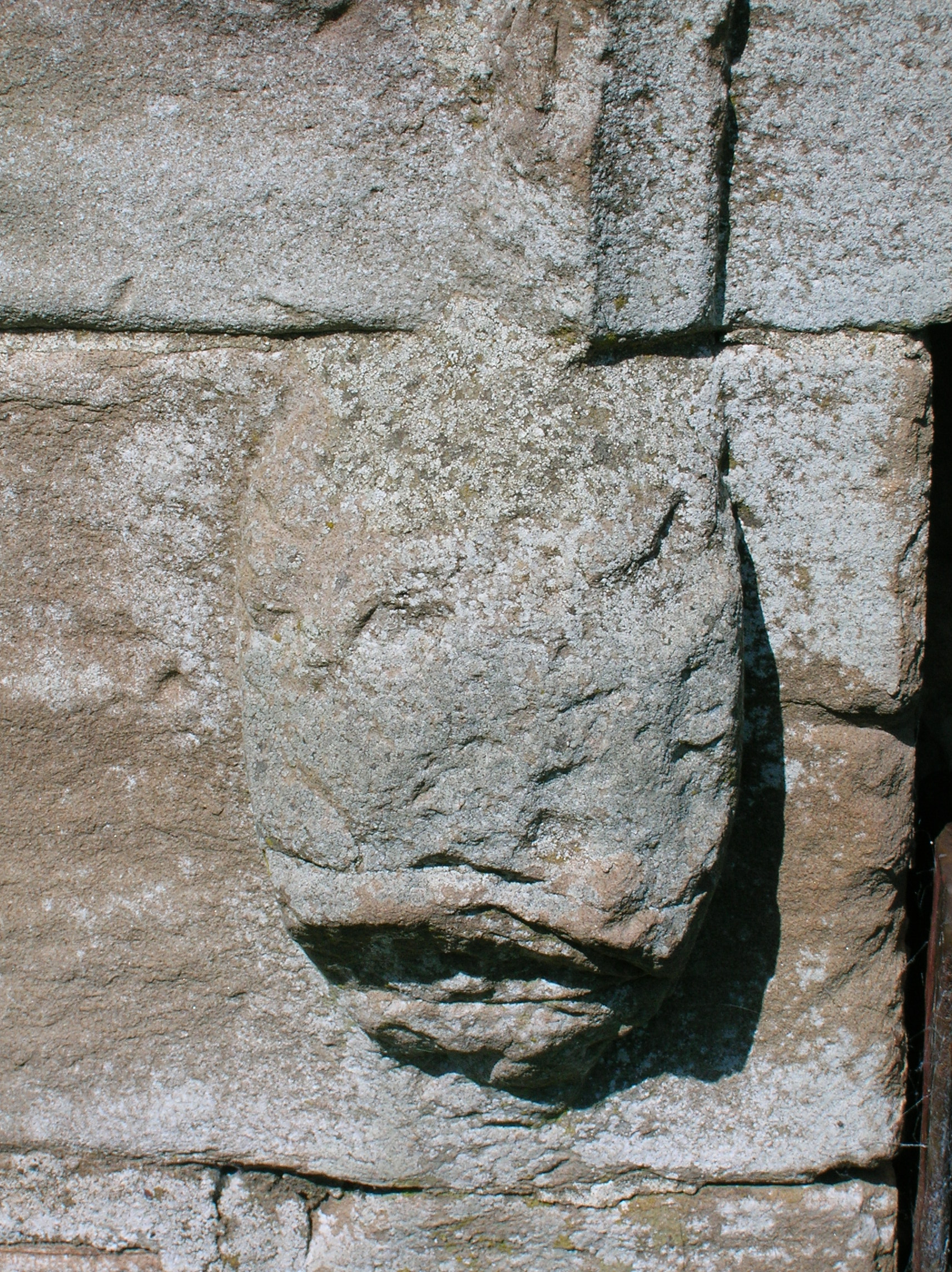
A possible Green Man from the abbey now at the Eglinton Doocot

The archaeology suggests that the abbey was built around an earlier church that may have been built during the time of Hugh de Morville, circa 1157. A long stretch of walling is suggestive of being the south side of the nave of this earlier foundation. The remnants of the chapter house bordering the cloisters and a passageway may have been built during the 1180s. Richard de Morville may have been responsible in around 1190-1200 for the great processional arch between the gable and the wall; dying in 1189 this may also have been a bequest or gift. Uniquely this arch has a Norman style capital bearing two carved figures, said to be Adam & Eve.

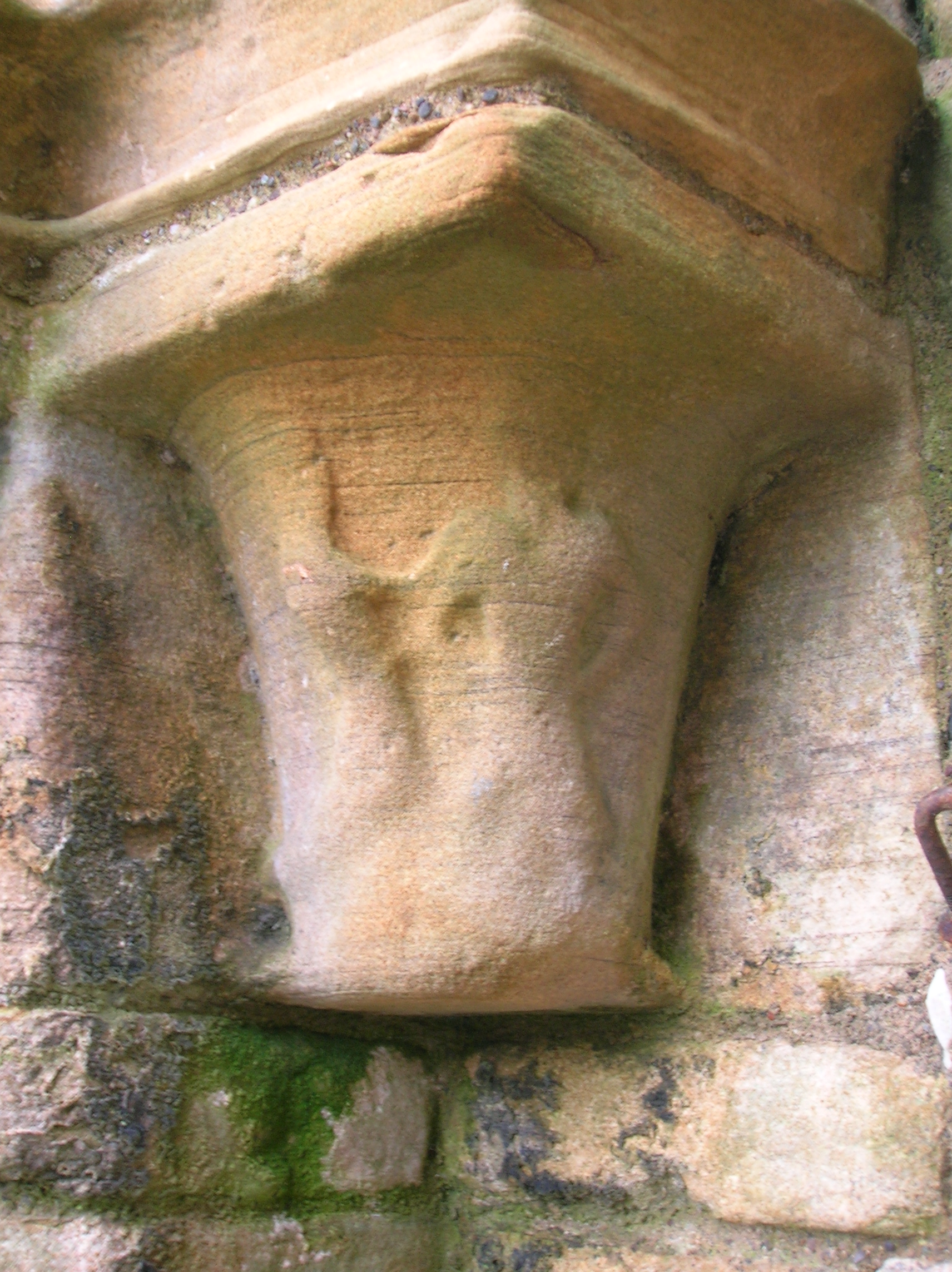
The Adam & Eve carvings

A major development or reconstruction phase took place in the 1230s, possibly completed by one of the de Morville daughters as the male line had died out. Pont states that Dorethea de Morville, daughter of Richard de Morville and wife of Philip de Horssey, 'accomplished' the fabric of the monastery. De Morvilles mound at Dreghorn was supposed to have commemorated a daughter of the family, drowned at the Holm ford; any possible link to the abbey is unrecorded. The two towers and the west transept seem to have been added on in the 1250s.

=== Abbey treasure ===
The Black Book of the abbey, gold candlesticks and crosses, silver cups and bells were never found and legend has it that they were secreted away in a vault beneath the abbey buildings where they lie to this day. A local tradition also asserts that were secreted away on one of the crannogs on the nearby Ashgrove or Stevenston Loch which conveniently lay just off the old Kings Road from the abbey to Portencross.

== Kilwinning Abbey tower ==
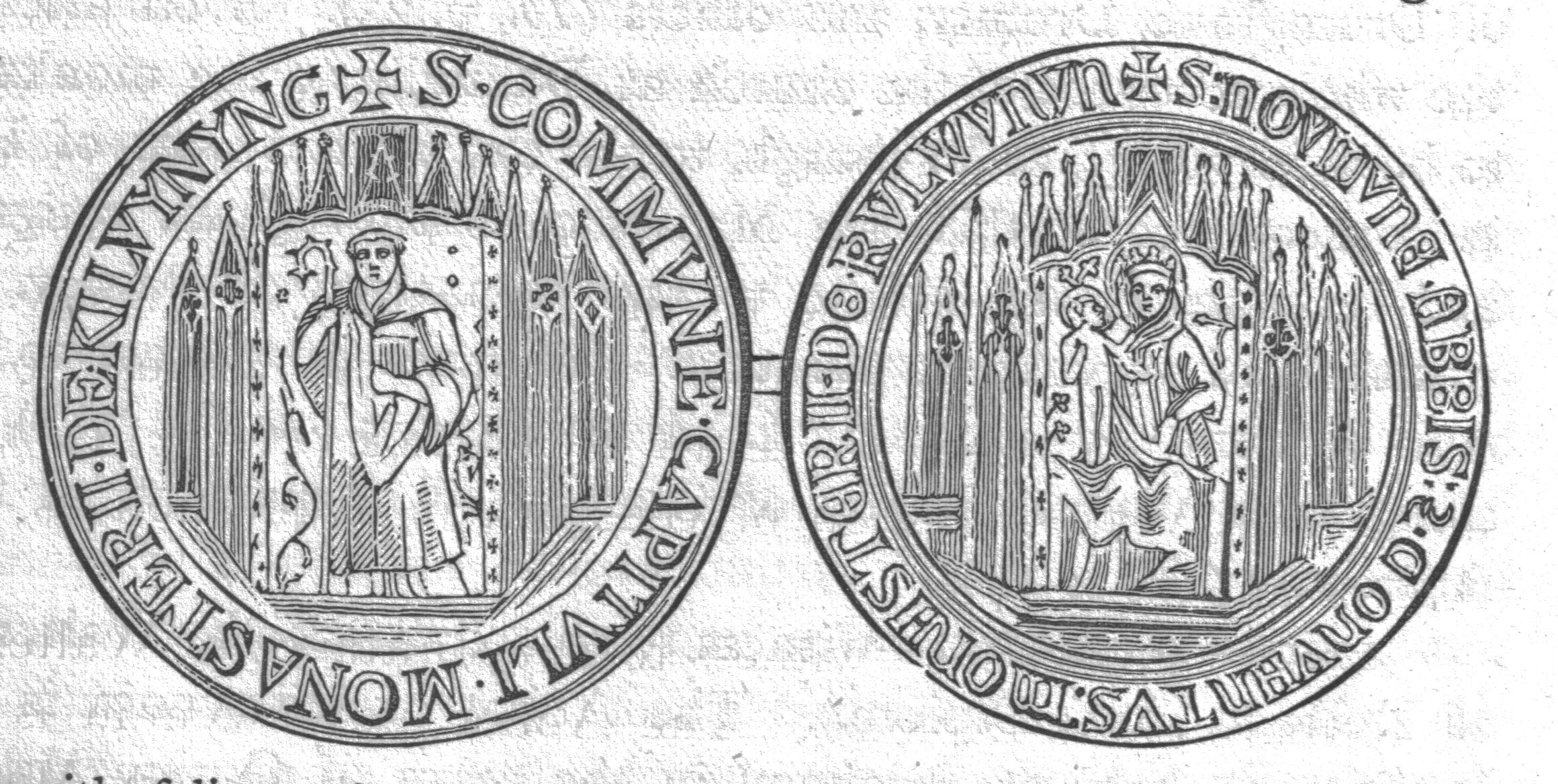
The Kilwinning Monastery seal of the 16th Century

The Earl had used the old tower as a prison and the bells were rung to gather together the local people for the 'King's service' or in times of war. Bessie Graham was imprisoned in the Tower in 1649 on a charge of witchcraft. During a disagreement with her neighbour, comments were made by Bessie that onlookers interpreted as a curse. Mrs Rankin died a few weeks later and this was taken as sufficient proof to formally accuse Bessie of being a witch. Alexander Bogs, a Witch Finder, was called in to examine Bessie and his verdict was that she was a witch, in league with the devil. Bessie was taken to Corsehill Moor and burned at the stake.

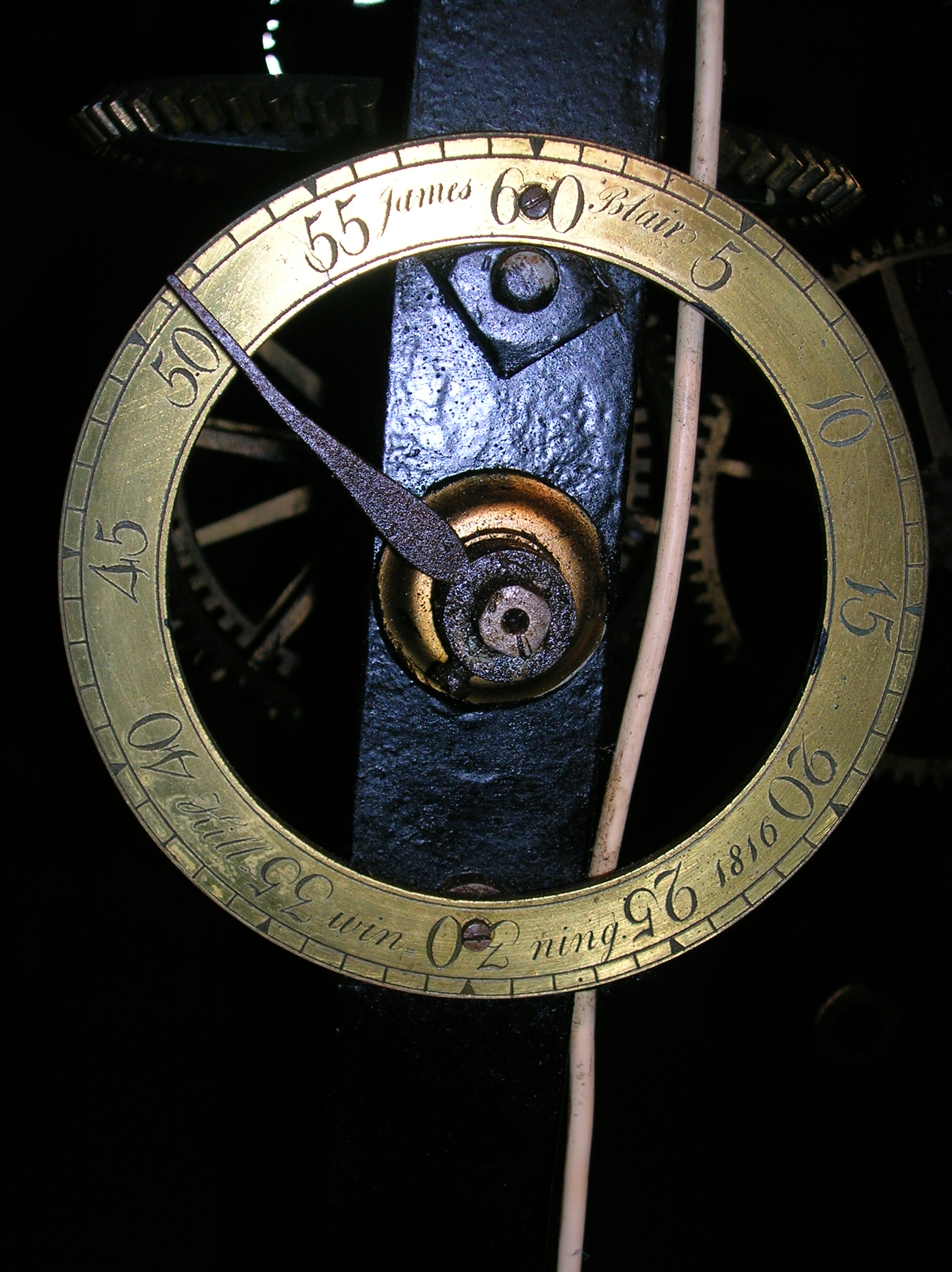
Part of the 1816 clock mechanism made by John Blair of Kilwinning

The earl spent a considerable sum of money repairing the tower in 1789, however it developed large rents and fissures the sides in 1809. The one remaining northern tower stood until 1814 when it was deemed unsafe and demolished with gunpowder, just when strengthening works were about to begin; one wall had just collapsed with a mighty crash that shook everything as if there had been an earthquake. The tower had been struck by lightning on 2 August 1809, the considerable damage caused hastening its demise. The bells, the original Kilwinning Bell and a smaller bell donated by the Eglinton family, had been removed a fortnight earlier.

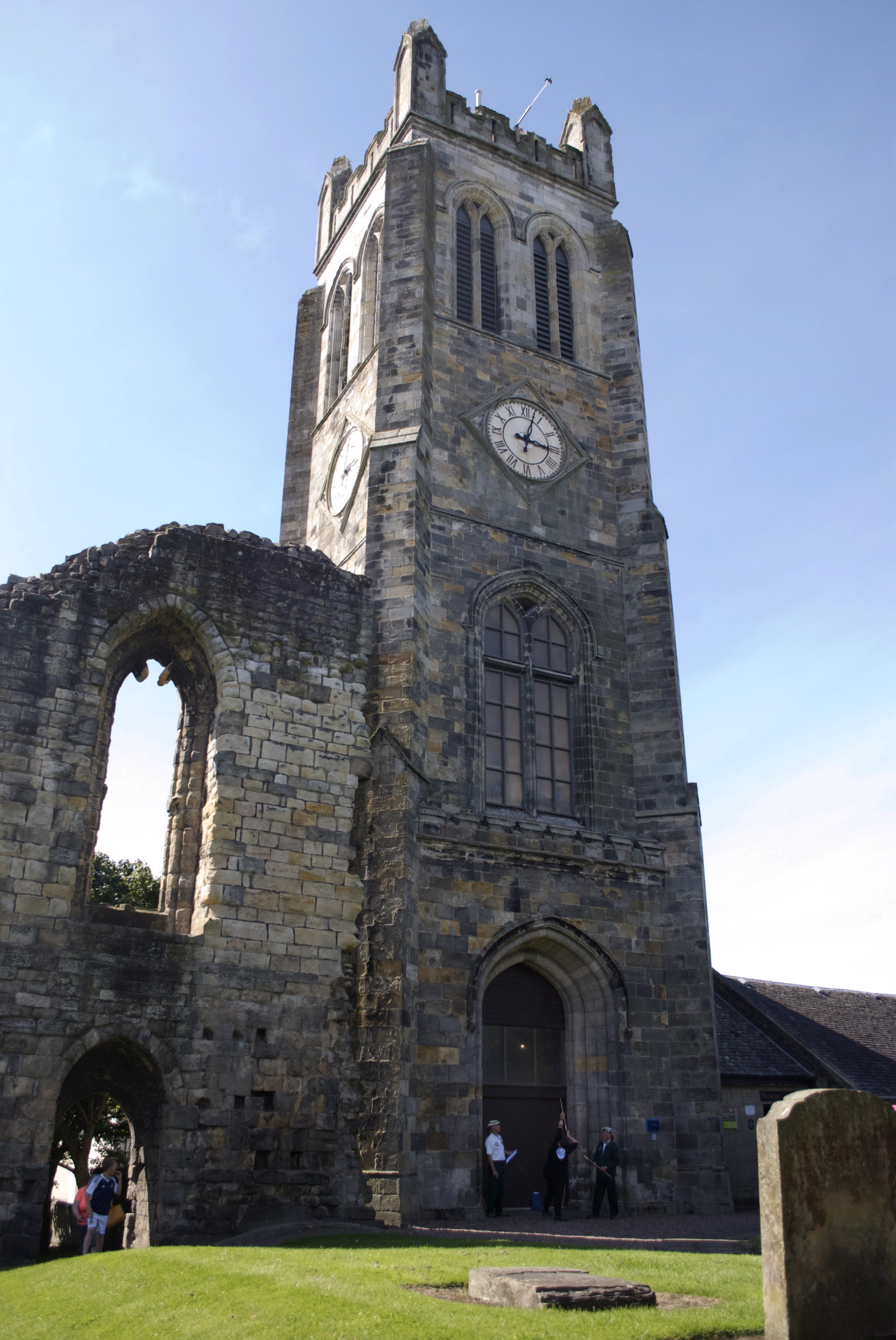
The replacement tower, seen during an open papingo shoot held by the Ancient Society of Kilwinning Archers.

Designs and plans were quickly produced for a replacement tower, the first by John Connell of Dalgarven then a second and third set by the architect David Hamilton from Glasgow. The Heritors approved of David Hamilton's second design, accepted John Connell's estimate of one thousand four hundred and thirty pounds for building the new Tower and John Wyllie of Corsehill, a mason, was appointed as the inspector and superintendent of the building.

On 21 December 1814, the foundation stone was laid by William Davidson Esq., Grandmaster of the Mother Lodge, Kilwinning, in the presence of the Earl of Eglinton and the Heritors of the Parish of Kilwinning. On 12 November 1816 the new 103 feet high clock tower was completed.

A conservation programme was undertaken by the local authority in 1993-95 and the tower is now owned by North Ayrshire Council. The tower houses a heritage centre which opened in 1995 and displays items of local interest, including the history of the abbey and tower; the poets Robert Burns and the "Bard of the Yukon" Robert W. Service.

The Ancient Society of Kilwinning Archers, dating back to 1483, are an important feature of the collection. The Kilwinning Archers still meets regularly, including the annual papingo shoot held in the grounds of the Abbey on the first Saturday in June. This event is said to be the oldest archery competition in the World and involves a wooden 'papingo' or 'popinjay', which is suspended from the clock-tower, which the archers attempt to dislodge.

The Heritage Centre in the tower is officially managed by the Museum Services of North Ayrshire Council, but staffed and cared for by volunteer members of Kilwinning Heritage.

=== Views of Kilwinning Abbey ===
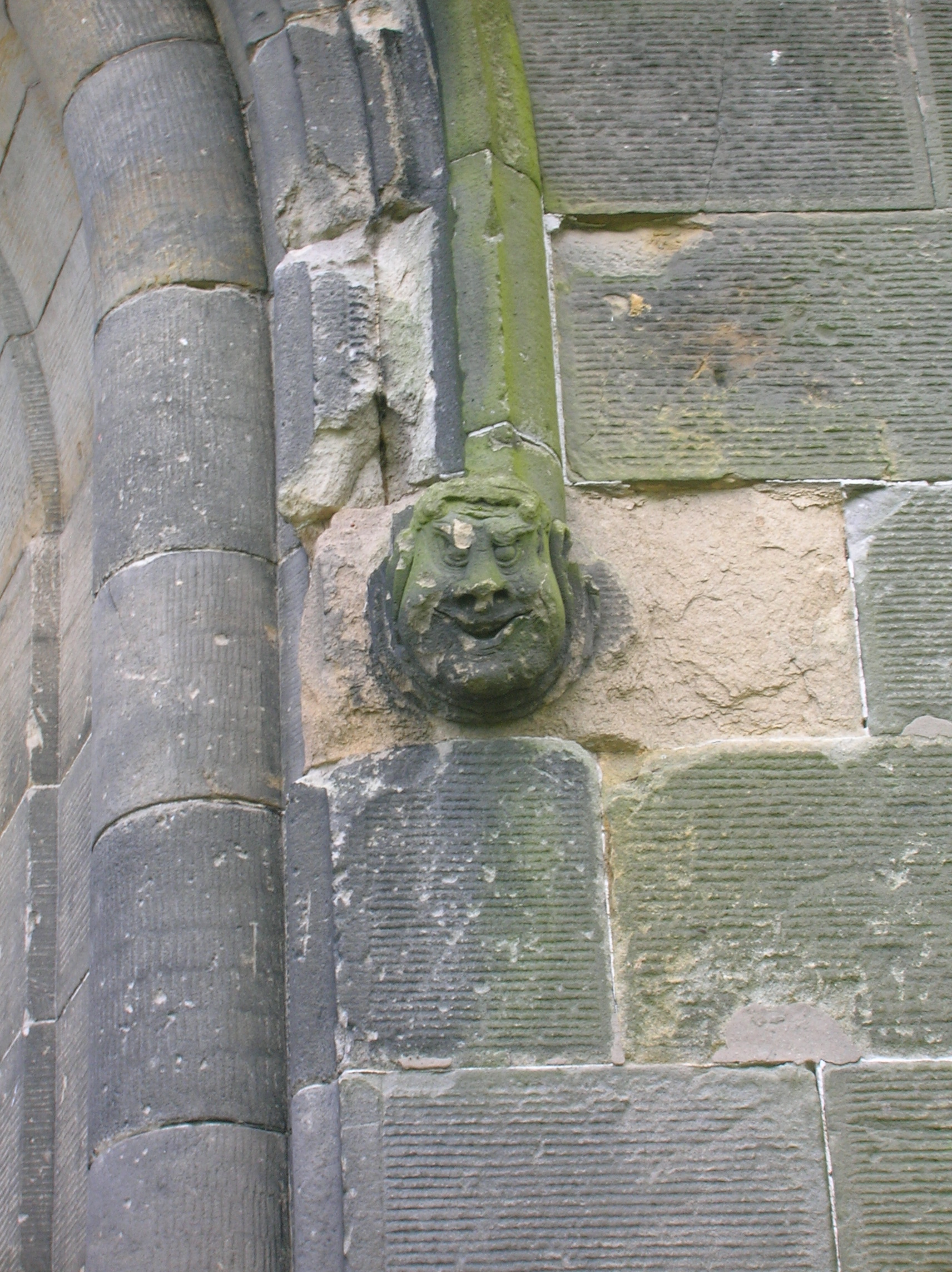
The Merry Monk on the clocktower

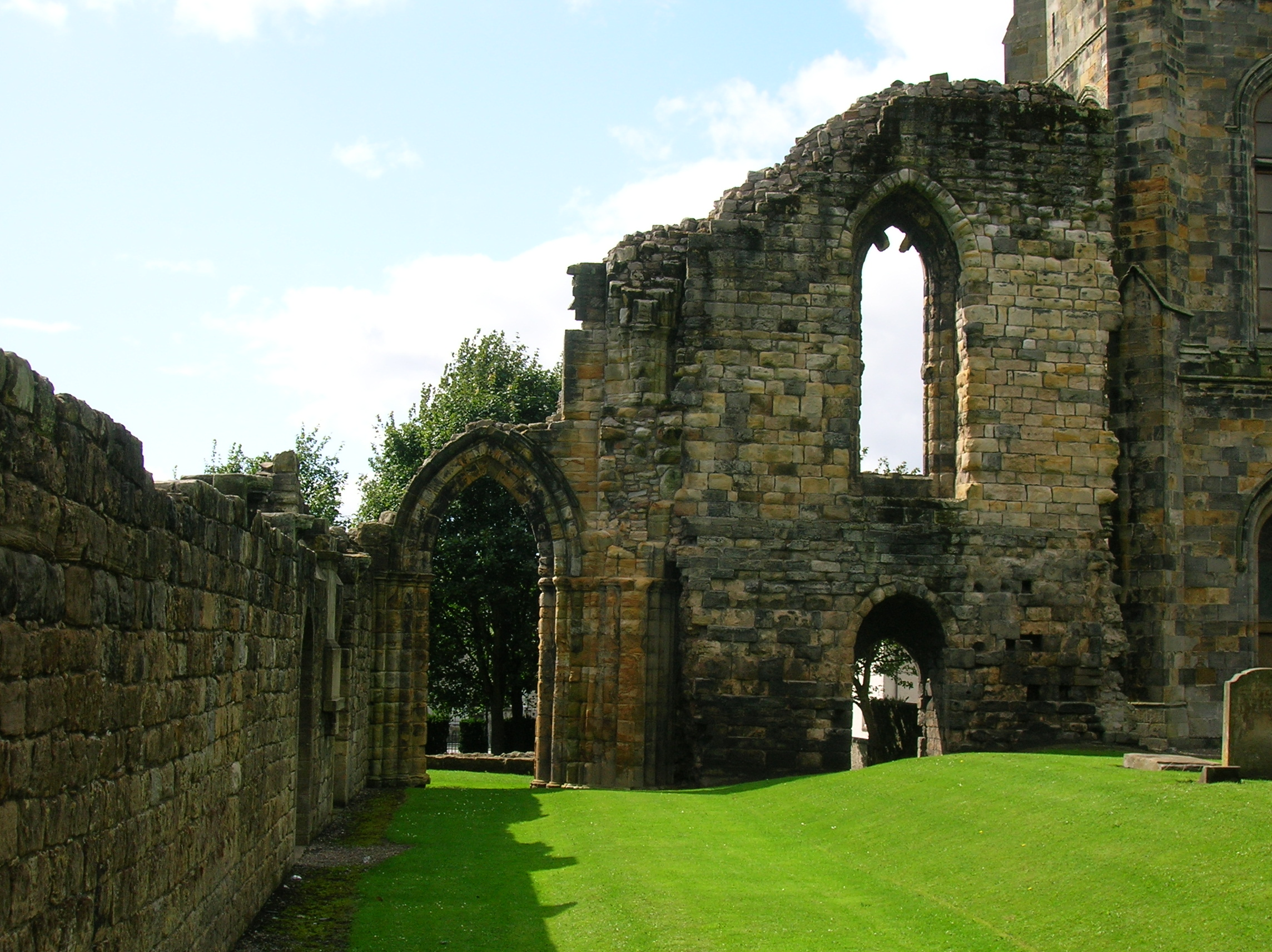
Inside the old abbey transept looking towards the tower

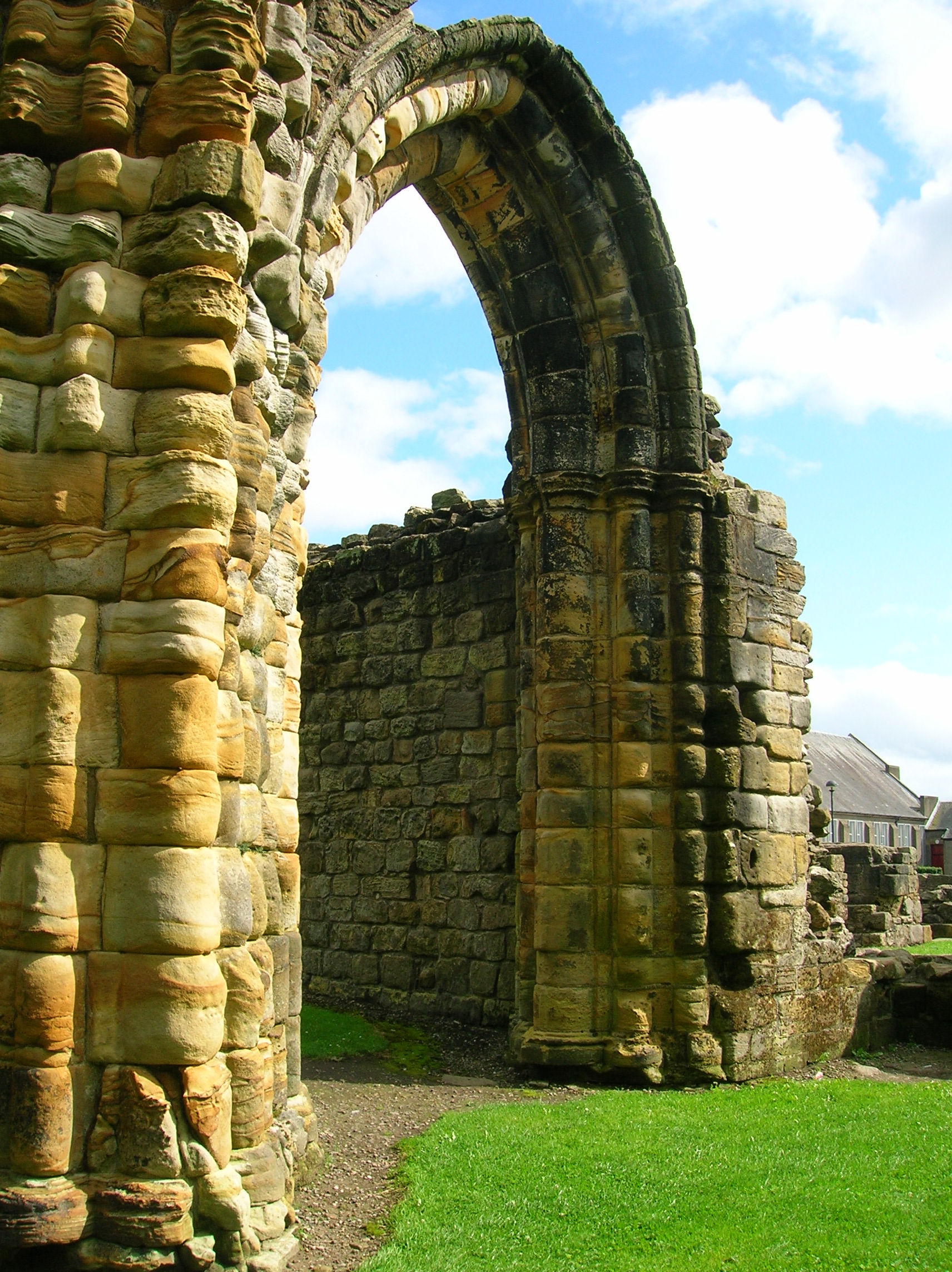
Archway into the fallen tower

== Saint Winning ==
=== Saint Winning's Cross ===
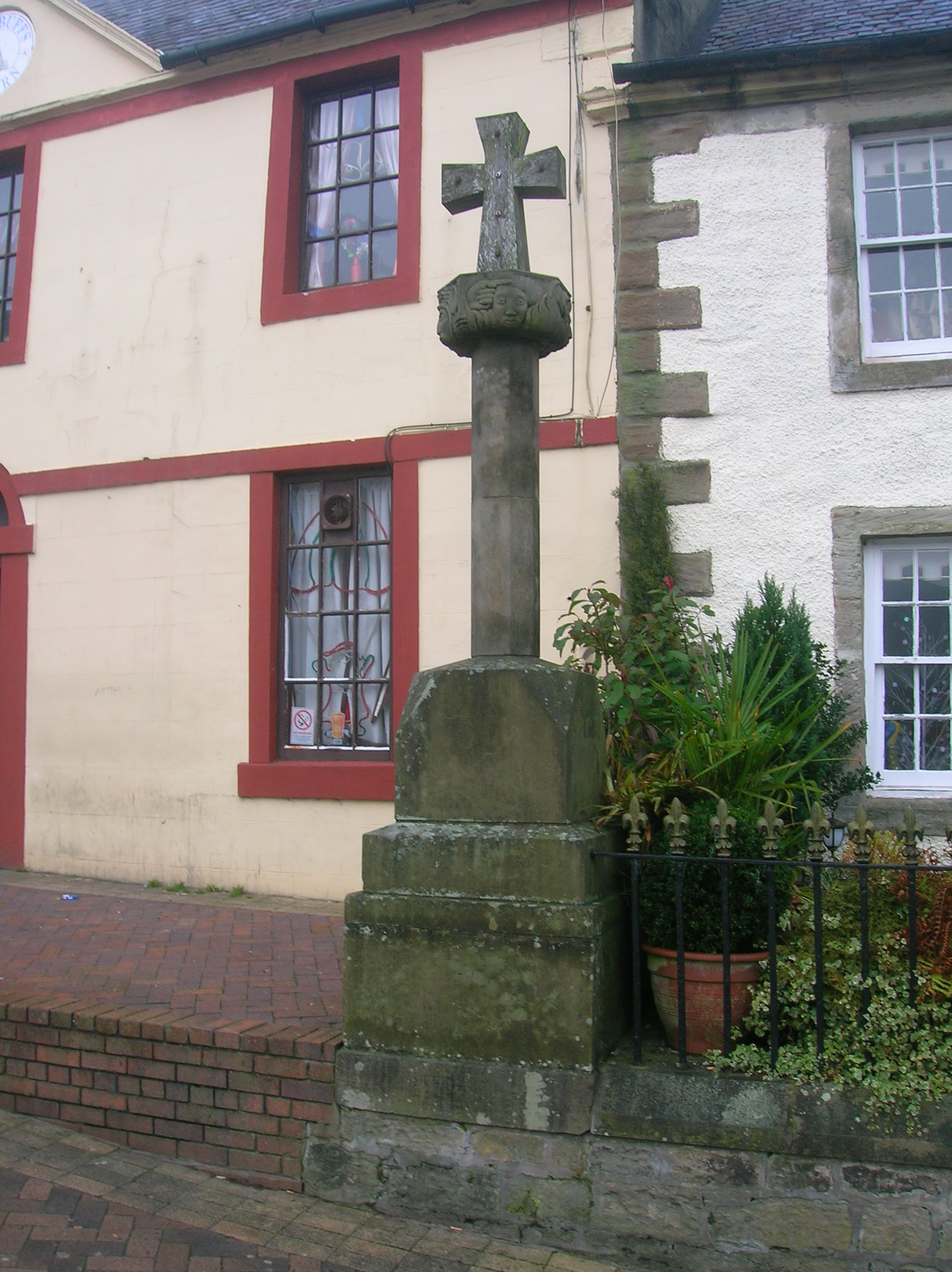
The Mercat Cross in Kilwinning

Dobie records that the only surviving remnant of 'Popery' was the Cross on the main street. In the 19th century a replacement was made of wood and was no longer a place of worship or of miracle cures. This is most likely the Mercat Cross, a modern replica of which stands on the Main Street in Kilwinning.

Dobie also records that a recent building had incorporated in its gable end a stone from the abbey representing scripture scenes. This fragment of a more ancient cross, St Winning's Cross, is said to have been originally erected at the first church built by Saint Winning and was dedicated to Saint Bridget and to the Virgin Mary. Miracles are said to have taken place at it.

The surviving shaft segment is housed in the North Ayrshire Heritage Centre, Saltcoats and carries a double-beaded interlace pattern on one side, whilst the other has a carving of David sitting with a harp; David on horseback carrying a spear; and a lamb being attacked by a lion. It has been suggested that David symbolises the power of good preventing evil in the form of the lion, from harming the weak; the lamb. The cross's style places it within the Govan School, with similarities to crosses at Govan, Barochan, and Inchinnan. Two additional sections of this cross were recovered during the excavations in Kilwinning Abbey undertaken in the 1960s, these portions of the cross are held by Historic Scotland.

=== Saint Winning's Well ===
This well is said to have formed from the tears of the saint. In the 1860s the well still existed and provided pure and excellent water. The well was situated a little to the south of the manse, which is located off Saint Winning's Road. The construction of the Glasgow and South Western Railway resulted in the destruction of the well.

A well blessed by the saint is known to have miraculously flowed red for eight days on significant occasions in 1184, such as at times of war. In 1826 workmen clearing ground near the abbey uncovered a lead pipe which was running down from the abbey to the well, then known as Kyle's Well.

== Associated chapels ==
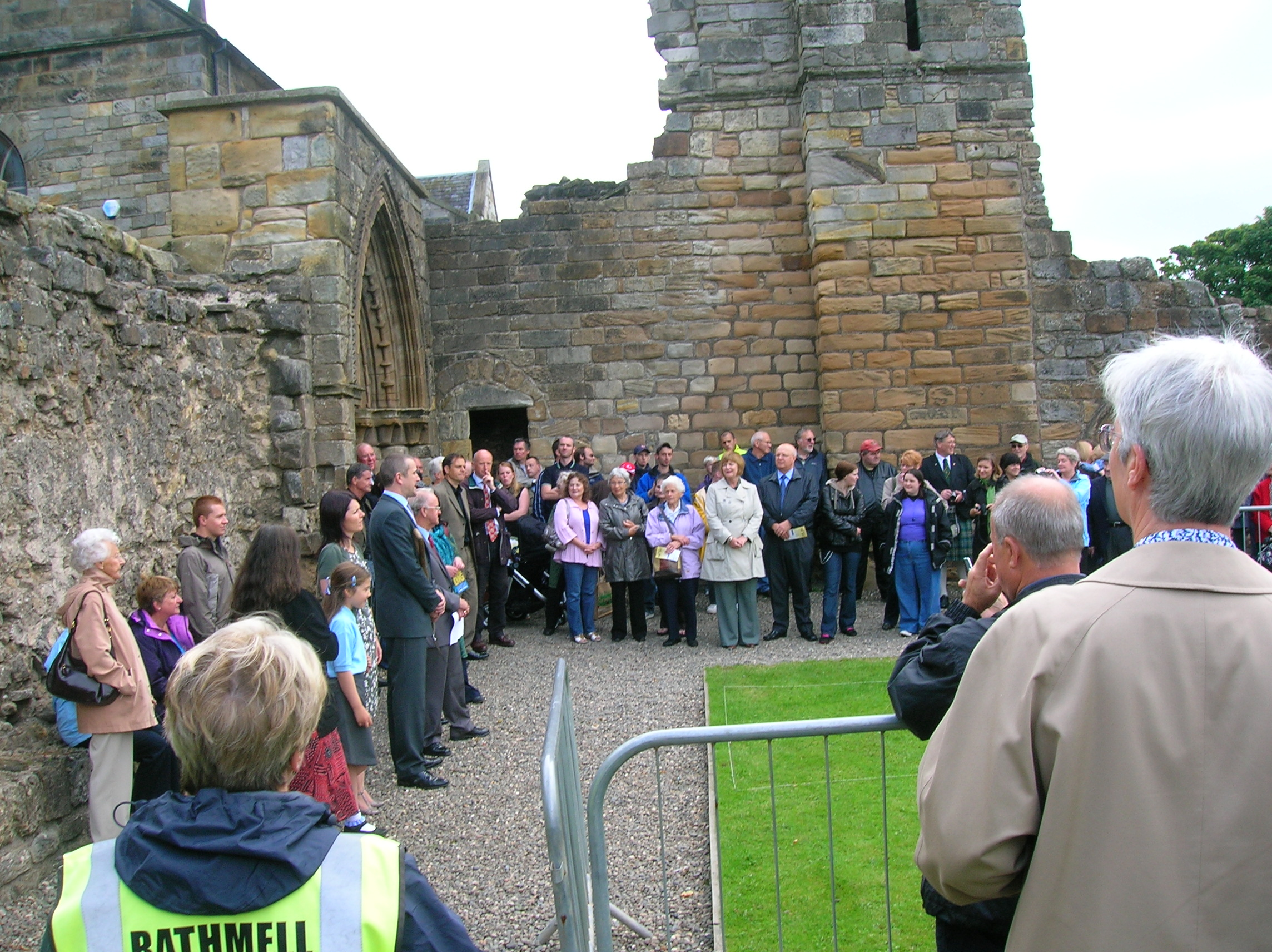
Launch of archaeological dig in August 2010

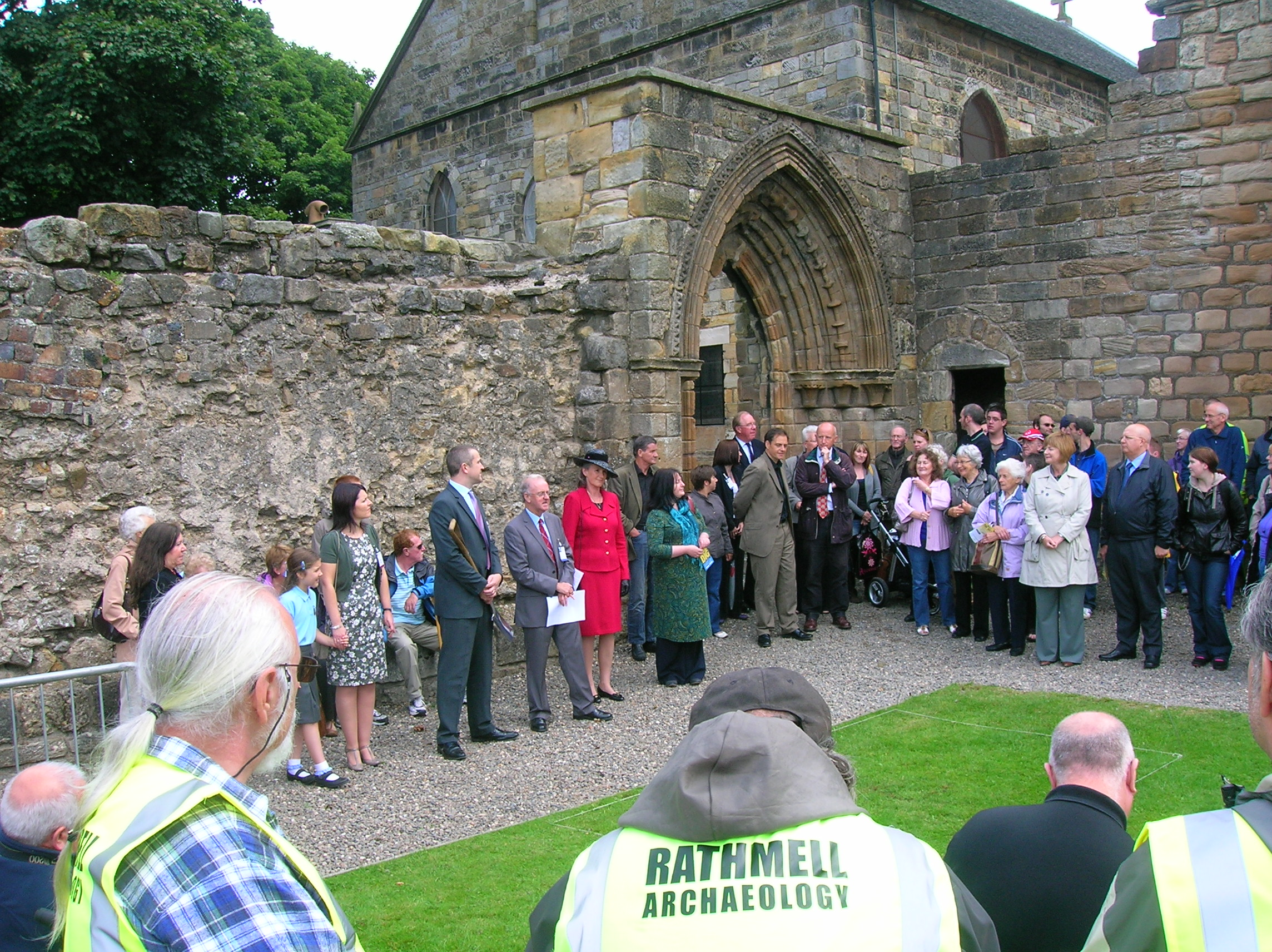
The public and VIPs at the launch of the archaeological dig in August 2010

Three or possibly four chapels associated with the abbey may have existed before the reformation; one in the vicinity of either Chapelholm Wood or Benslie wood; one at Weirston; another at Stanecastle gate; and a fourth near the Drukken Steps.

Evidence for these chapels is the Chapelcroft farm that existed near Laigh Moncur, becoming the old deer shelter in the Deer Park, and a Chapel Bridge over the Lugton Water. A John Rankin in 1694 is recorded as living at an 'Eglinton Chapel'. The Weirston chapel is said to have been the private chapel of the Montgomerie family, dedicated to Saint Wyssyn and in use up to as late as 1570. Father Elmerides Hentyson may have been their priest. The placename 'Ladyha' survives near Weirston, a likely reminder of our 'Lady', the Virgin Mary; farms here of this name are recorded in the Hearth Tax records of the 1690s.

== Masons ==
The masonic link derives from the belief that the abbey was constructed by foreign free Masons, assisted by Scottish masons. The term Freemason derived from the right of these skilled workers to travel without the need to obtain permission from an overlord. These foreign masons brought the principles of their fraternity with them and initiated these principles in Scotland for the first time. The architect or Master Mason is said to have been recognised as the master mason of Scotland.

After the Battle of Bannockburn, Robert the Bruce is said to have attended a masonic festival at Kilwinning. King James I was a patron of the mother lodge of Kilwinning and presided as Grand Master whilst staying at the abbey. James II made the St Clair's of Roslin the hereditary Grand Masters of Scotland. The Tironensian monks were recognised for their skill in stonemasonry and architecture; many of the freemasons and architects were in fact monks.

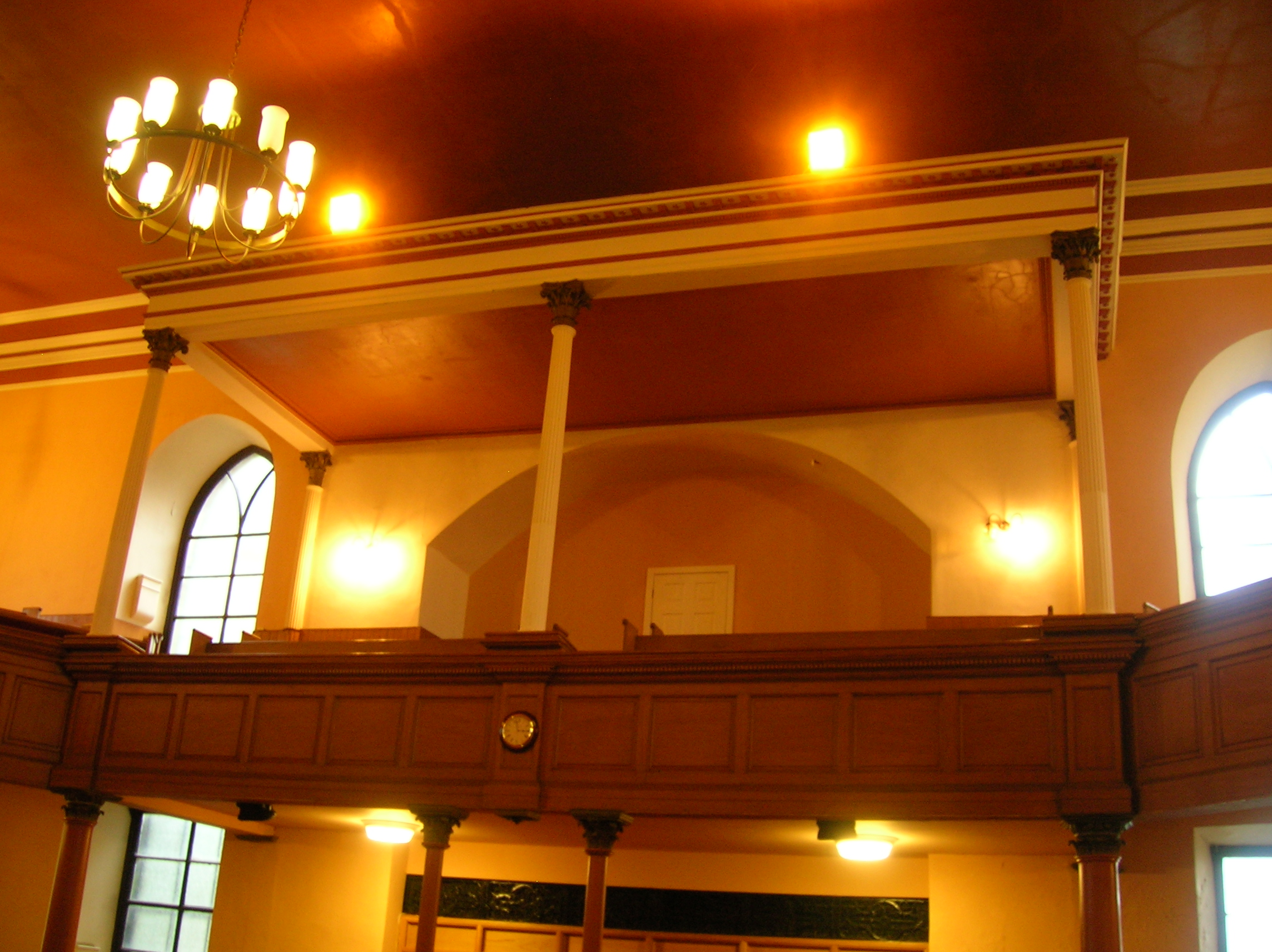
The Eglinton Loft within the Abbey church

In 1925 the Mother Kilwinning Social Club of Glasgow presented the Mother Lodge with a case made from wood said to have come from the roof of the Abbey. This case was made to hold the Master's jewel which had been given to the lodge by Patrick Montgomerie of Bourtreehill in 1735.

== Ley tunnel ==
Persistent rumours exist of a two-mile long ley tunnel which is said to run from Kilwinning Abbey, under the 'Bean Yaird', below the 'Easter Chaumers' and the 'Leddy firs', then underneath the River Garnock and the Lugton Water on to Eglinton Castle. No evidence exists for it, although it may be related to the underground burial vault of the Montgomeries which does exist under the old abbey or to the main sewer that would have led from the monastery to the river. Another tunnel is said to run from the abbey to its former property of Monkredding House on the road to Auchentiber.

== Burials ==
- Bernard of Kilwinning.
- Earls of Eglinton and Winton.
- Glasgows of Montgreenan.
- Reverend Doctor James Steven - mentioned in Burns's 'The Calf'.
- David Muir of Woodgreen - town benefactor and chamberlain to the Earl of Eglinton.

The Earls of Eglinton were buried here until 1886. Several of the families burial vaults existed until 1961, when they were demolished due to their unsafe condition. Burials include the following:

- Hugh Montgomerie, 1st Earl of Eglinton
- Anne Hamilton Montgomerie, wife of Hugh Montgomerie, 7th Earl of Eglinton
- Alexander Montgomerie, 9th Earl of Eglinton and his third wife Susanna Montgomery, Countess of Eglinton
- Alexander Montgomerie, 10th Earl of Eglinton
- Archibald Montgomerie, 11th Earl of Eglinton
- Archibald Montgomerie, 13th Earl of Eglinton

== Doocot ==
A large ornamental Gothic lectern style doocot (dovecote (English spelling)) or columbarium is located near the scanty remains of the Eglinton Mains farm at Eglinton, situated on the 'Long Drive' towards Sourlie Hill interchange. 55°38′18.2″N 4°39′26.8″W It is said to have come from the abbey which was latterly a possession of the Earls of Eglinton.

The design is from the 16th or 17th century, the abbey having been dissolved in around 1560. The architectural style is in keeping with the 1802 castle, however the ornamental door carvings and the stones may well have all come from the old abbey. Ness categorically states that the dovecot was moved to its present position in 1898 - 1900 and was hopeful that it would be restored to the abbey grounds.

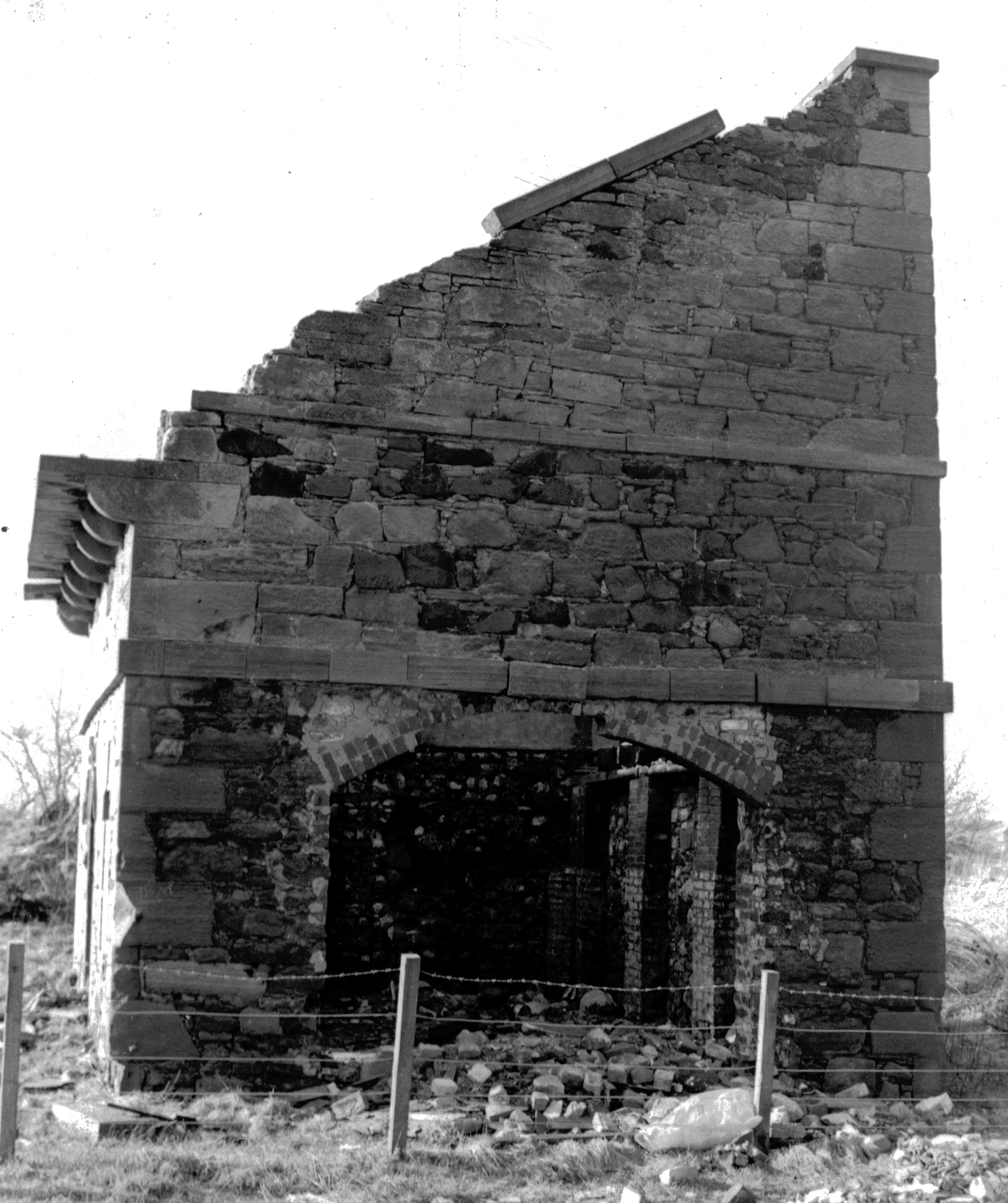
The Eglinton doocot prior to restoration. The local council had used it as a vehicle store.

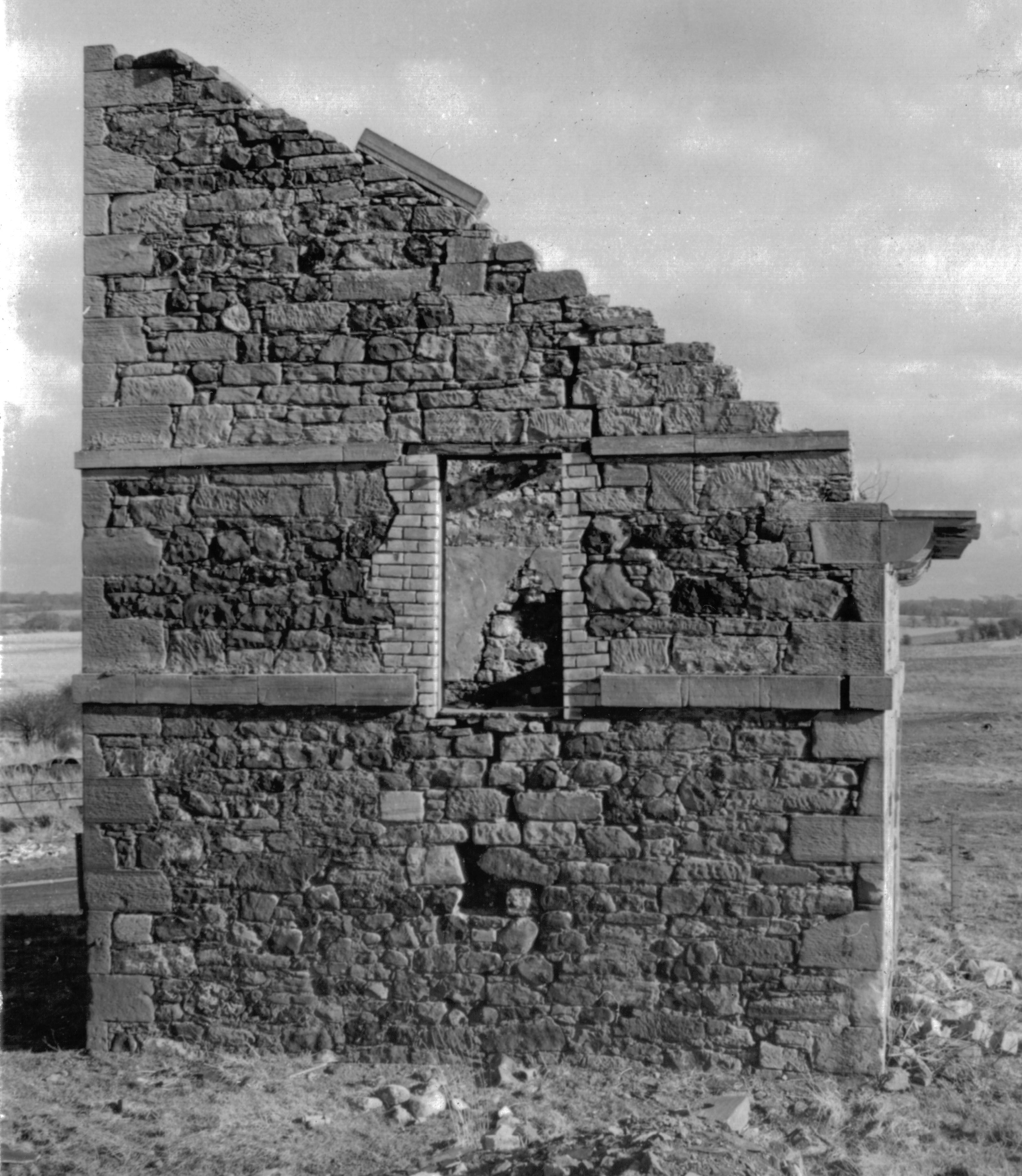
The Doocot - the Kilwinning facing end

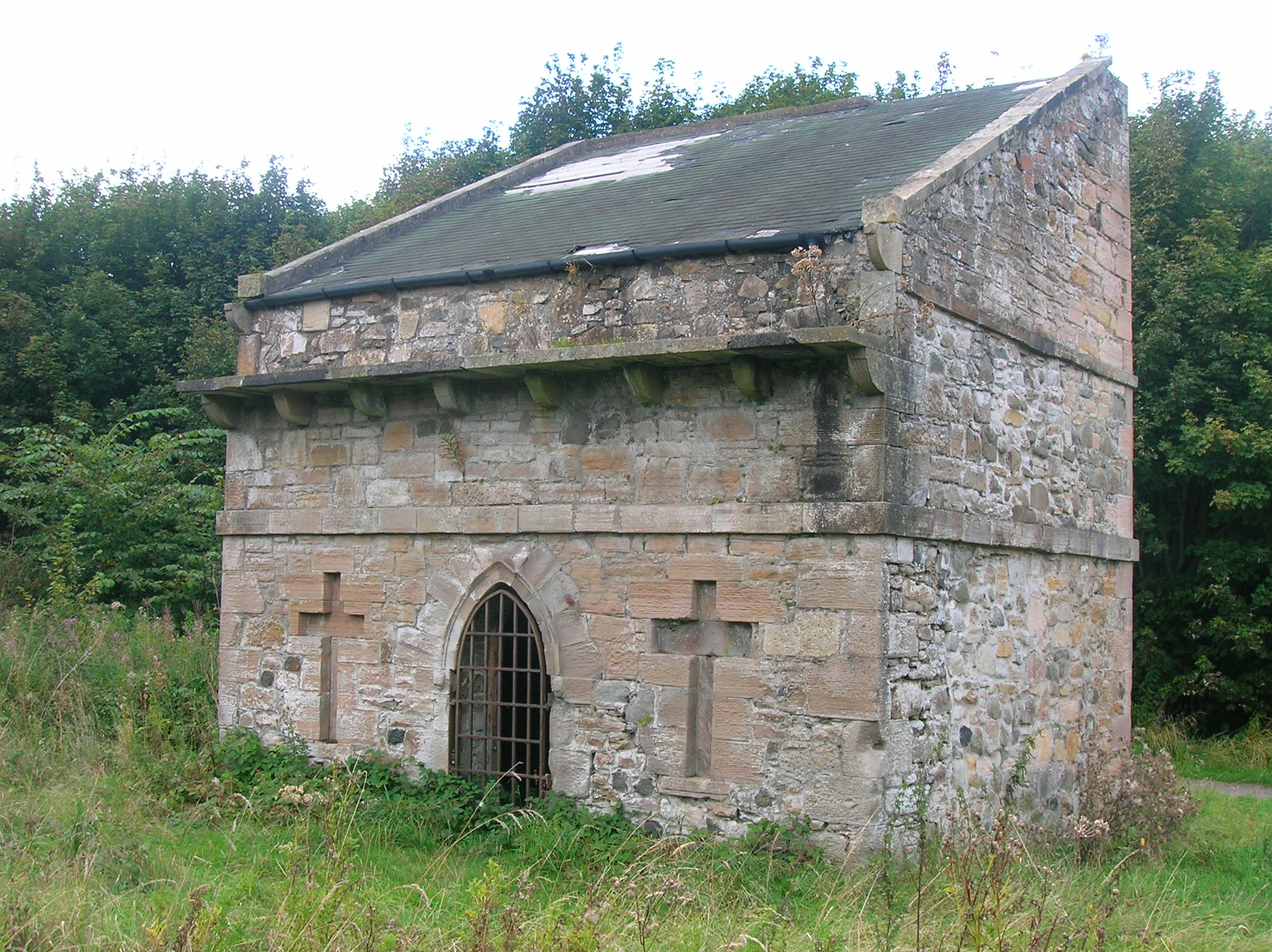
The restored doocot (dovecot)

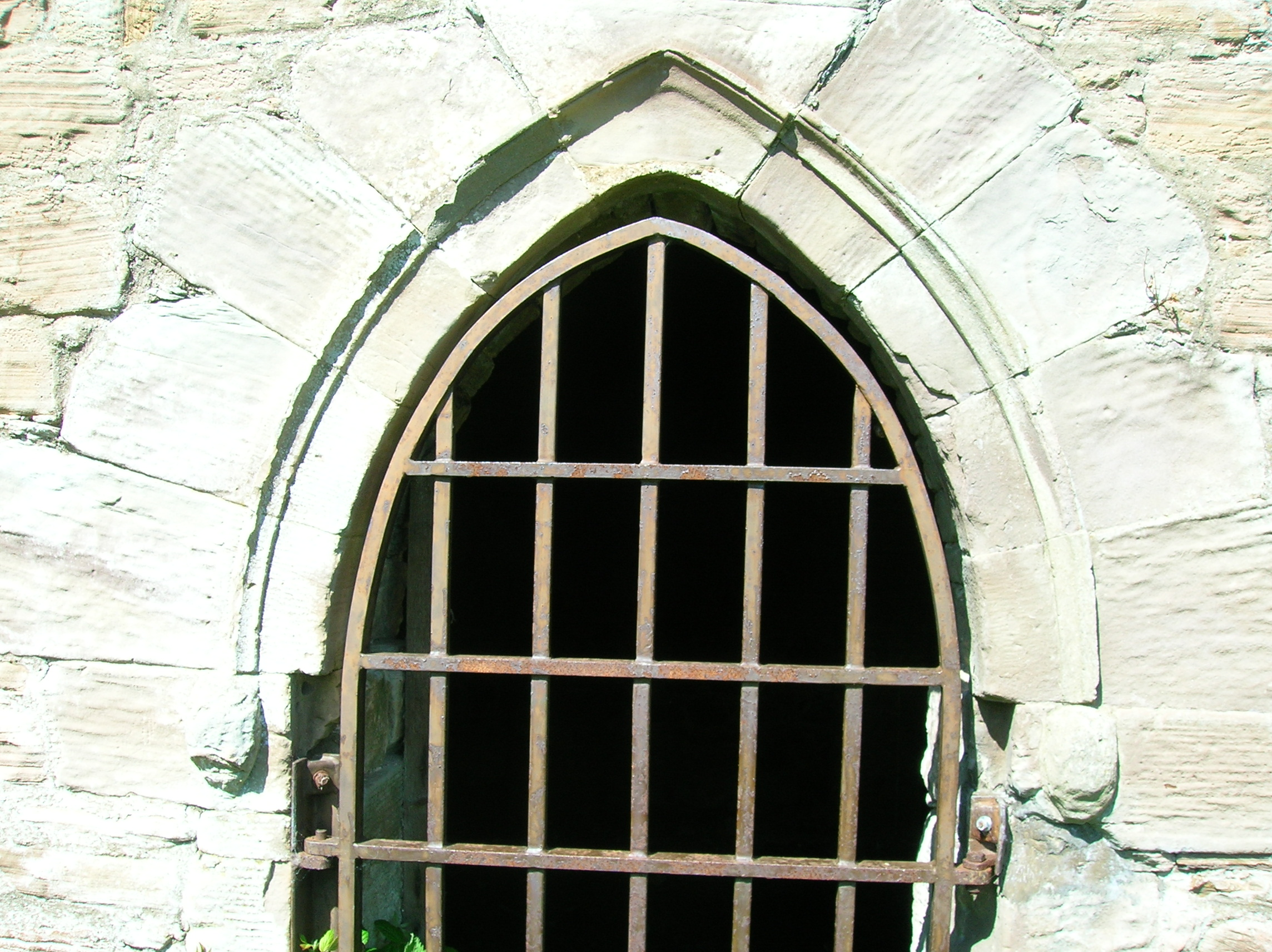
Medieval carving on the doocot, originally from Kilwinning Abbey

== Abbey mills ==
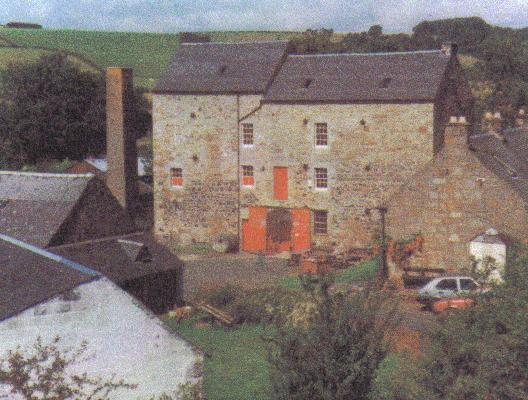
The main Dalgarven Mill buildings

The Bridgend mill on the Garnock was granted by Alexander Cunninghame, Commendator, to his son James of Montgreenan in 1645 and 1674. It is described as being at the west end of the bridge, with the mill lands of Milne Holme (sic) and Strickhirst.

Two other mills were held by the abbey, one being the modern day Dalgarven Mill, then known as the Walkmylne of Groatholm on the River Garnock; the site of the third mill is not known for certain however Sevenacres Mill is the most likely.

== Anecdote ==
Robin Cummel tells a story of the old abbey into which no females were allowed to enter. One day the Abbot was seen anxiously entering a dormitory from which a crying noise was coming. Upon further examination a mother cat was found with her five kittens.

== See also ==
- Drukken Steps
- Abbot of Kilwinning, for a list of abbots and commendators
- The Lands of Montgreenan - details of the murder of Alexander Cunninghame, commendator of the abbey.
- Lands of Willowyard
- Eglinton Country Park - details of the abbey doocot, etc.

== Bibliography ==
- Cowan, Ian B. & Easson, David E., Medieval Religious Houses: Scotland With an Appendix on the Houses in the Isle of Man, Second Edition, (London, 1976), p. 69
- Watt, D.E.R. & Shead, N.F. (eds.), The Heads of Religious Houses in Scotland from the 12th to the 16th Centuries, The Scottish Records Society, New Series, Volume 24, (Edinburgh, 2001), pp. 127–30
