= Hugh de Morville, Constable of Scotland =

Hugh de Morville (died 1162) of Appleby in Westmorland, England, hereditary Constable of Scotland, was a Norman knight who made his fortune in the service of David I of Scotland (d.1153), Prince of the Cumbrians, later King of Scotland.

== Origins ==
Hugh came from Morville in the Cotentin Peninsula, in northern France. His parentage is unclear. According to Barrow his father was probably Richard de Morville who in the early twelfth century witnessed charters made by Richard de Redvers relating to Montebourg and the church of St. Mary in the castle of Néhou, but though Keats-Rohan gives that man other possible sons, she does not similarly associate Hugh with Richard.

== In service of David of Scotland ==
Prince David of Scotland held Cotentin in northern France, given to him by King Henry I of England some time after 1106. Soon after, Hugh de Morville joined David's small military retinue in France. In 1113, following his marriage, Prince David was made Earl of Huntingdon and Northampton, and also became Prince of the Cumbrians, having forced his brother King Alexander I to hand over territory in southern Scotland David achieved this with the help of his French followers

David endowed Hugh with the estates of Bozeat and Whissendine, within his Huntingdon earldom as his wife's dowery. During David's conquest of northern England after 1136, Hugh was also given the lordship of Appleby, essentially northern Westmorland. These lands later formed the feudal barony of Appleby.

After the death of Edward, Constable of Scotland, almost certainly in 1138 at the Battle of the Standard, Hugh was awarded that office. In addition "he obtained land and lordships which placed him in the very first rank of the Anglo-Norman nobility in Scotland. These comprised the Lordship of the Regality of Lauderdale, together with detached estates at Saltoun, Haddingtonshire, Nenthorn and Newton Don, Berwickshire, at Dryburgh on the Tweed opposite Old Melrose, and probably also at Heriot in Midlothian. In the west of Scotland he was given the whole of the Lordship of Cunningham, the northernmost third of Ayrshire. Lauderdale, with a castle at Lauder, was held, it seems, for six knights' service; Cunningham possibly for two, with a castle at Irvine." In 1316-20 Cunningham was granted to Robert Stewart for three knight's service.

In 1150 Hugh made a further mark on the history of southern Scotland by founding Dryburgh Abbey for Premonstratensian canons regular, where he died as a canon in 1162.

== Marriage and children ==
Hugh married Beatrice de Beauchamp, the heiress of the manor of Houghton Conquest in Bedfordshire. She is presumed to be a daughter of Robert de Beauchamp (died pre-1130) (son of Hugh de Beauchamp). By Beatrice he had at least two sons and two daughters, including:

- Hugh de Morville, Lord of Westmorland (died c. 1202), who inherited his father's estates in the north of England. He was a principal player in the 1170 murder of Thomas Becket, Archbishop of Canterbury. He subsequently fell out of favour with King Henry II who in 1174 confiscated his Lordship of Westmorland (which he had inherited from his father who had received it from David I) and re-granted it to his sister, Maud de Morville, wife of William de Vieuxpont.
- Richard de Morville, possibly the second son, who inherited his father's Scottish estates and lands in the Honour of Huntingdon. He also succeeded to the hereditary office of Constable of Scotland.
- Simon de Moreville (d. 1167), another possible son. He was seated at Kirkoswald, Cumbria, ward of Leath, Cumberland, and married Ada de Engaine, heiress of the Feudal barony of Burgh by Sands, Cumberland.
- Ada de Morville, who at some time before 1157, married Roger Bertram, lord of Mitford, Northumberland.
- Grace de Morville, another possible daughter, wife of the Cumbrian magnate Sir Hubert de Vaux, of Gilsland.

== Death and burial ==
Hugh eventually retired as a canon to his foundation at Dryburgh Abbey, where he soon died in 1162. An ancient memorial to him in the south wall is said to mark his burial-place.

== Bibliography ==
- Anderson, Alan Orr Scottish Annals from English Chroniclers: AD 500–1286, (London, 1908), republished, Marjorie Anderson (ed.) (Stamford, 1991)
- Barrow, G.W.S., The Anglo-Norman Era in Scottish History, Oxford, 1980, p. 71n.
- Barrow, G. W. S., "Beginnings of Military Feudalism", in G.W.S. Barrow (ed.), The Kingdom of the Scots, (Edinburgh, 2003), pp. 250–78
- Barrow, G. W. S., (editor) The Scots and the North of England in The Kingdom of the Scots, (Edinburgh, 2003), pp. 130–47
- Duncan, A.A.M., Scotland: The Making of the Kingdom, (Edinburgh, 1975)
- Keats-Rohan, K.S.B., Domesday Descendants: A Prosopography of Persons Occurring in English Documents 1066-1166. II. Pipe Rolls to Cartae Baronum, (Woodbridge, 2002)
- Lawrie, Sir Archibald, Early Scottish Charters Prior to A.D. 1153, (Glasgow, 1905)
- Oram, Richard, David: The King Who Made Scotland, (Gloucestershire, 2004)
- Stringer, Keith, Early Lords of Lauderdale, in Keith Stringer (ed.), Essays on the Nobility of Medieval Scotland, (Edinburgh, 1985), pp. 44–71
- Stringer, Keith, Morville, Hugh de (d. 1162), Oxford Dictionary of National Biography, Oxford University Press, 2004 accessed 27 Nov 2006
- Watt, D.E.R. & Shead, N.F. (eds.), The Heads of Religious Houses in Scotland from the 12th to the 16th Centuries, The Scottish Records Society, New Series, Volume 24, (Edinburgh, 2001)

New title	Lord of Lauderdale; 1113 x 1124–1162	Succeeded by Richard de Morville
New title	Lord of Cunningham; 1113 x 1124–1162	Succeeded by Richard de Morville
Preceded by Edward	Constable of Scotland; 1138–1162	Succeeded by Richard de Morville
