= Richard de Morville =

12th-century Constable of Scotland

- Constable of Scotland
- Died: 1189
- Noble family: Morville family
- Spouse: Avice de Lancaster
- Father: Hugh de Morville
- Mother: Beatrice de Beauchamp

Richard de Morville (died 1189), Lord of Cunninghame succeeded his father, Hugh de Morville (died 1162), as Constable of Scotland and in his Scottish estates and English lands at Bozeat in Northamptonshire, and Rutland, as well as a number of feus of the Honour of Huntingdon.

Around 1180, Richard de Morville, with the consent of his son William, granted liberty to the monks of Melrose to plough and sow the lands of Blainslie and the plain beyond the grove over to the Leader Water. This grant was confirmed by William de Morville, presumably his son.

Based on the writings of cartographer Timothy Pont (who viewed the cartulary of Kilwinning Abbey), it was Richard de Morville who founded the Tironensian abbey of Kilwinning, Cunningham. Pont cites a date of 1191, but Richard de Morville was dead by then. Other sources claim dates of 1157, but this is likely confusion with his father's founding of Dryburgh Abbey. It has been suggested by historian Ian B. Cowan that the dates cited are likely to be incorrect, and makes a strong case for the foundation date of 1187. However, Cowan acknowledges that the precise details of the founding of this Abbey would be found in the cartulary, which is now lost. All that is certain is written in the Liber Pluscardensis which notes 'Kylwynnyn in Connyngham Tironensis Fundator Morville.'.

Richard established the St Leonard's Hospital at Lauder. Later in the twelfth century, he rented Eddleston—now a parish in Peeblesshire—from the Bishop of Glasgow.

Richard married Avice (who survived him), the daughter of William de Lancaster I, possibly by his spouse Gundred, daughter of William de Warenne, 2nd Earl of Surrey. They had at least four children:

- Malcolm, accidentally killed by Adulf de St.Martin while hunting.
- William, alive in 1180 but said to have died without issue.
- Maud, who married William de Vieuxpont (who became Lord of Westmorland)
- Elena, also known as Helena,(born circa 1167), eventual sole heir to her father, who married Lochlann of Galloway (also known as Roland Fitz Uhrtred; died 1200).

After Richard's death the lands and title went to his sole heir, his daughter Elena (sometimes written Helena) and her husband, Lochlann, who then became Constable of Scotland, a title he preferred over that of Lord of Galloway.

== See also ==
- Lambroughton - More details of the De Morvilles.
- Dreghorn - Maid Morville's Mound.

== Sources ==
- Ancestral Roots of Certain American Colonists Who Came to America Before 1700, by Frederick Lewis Weis, Line 38–25
- The Lordship of Galloway, by Robert Riddell of Glenriddell, Society of Antiquaries of Scotland, Edinburgh, November 1787.
- The Dormant Abeyant, Forfeited, and Extinct Peerages, by Sir Bernard Burke, Ulster King of Arms, London, 1883, p. 313.
- The Records of the Regality of Melrose, edited by Charles S Romanes, C.A., Scottish History Society, Edinburgh, 1917, volume III, p.xxxvii.
- The Normans in Scotland, by R.L.Graeme Ritchie, Edinburgh University Press, 1954.
- The Anglo-Norman Era in Scottish History, by Professor G. W. S. Barrow, F.B.A., Oxford, 1980.
- The Book of Stobo Church. Being the First Volume of a Series of “Books of the Church”, Comp. from Original Sources by Dr. Gunn, Peebles, 1907, p. 6.
