= Lands of Sevenacres =

- Kilwinning, North Ayrshire, Scotland; UK
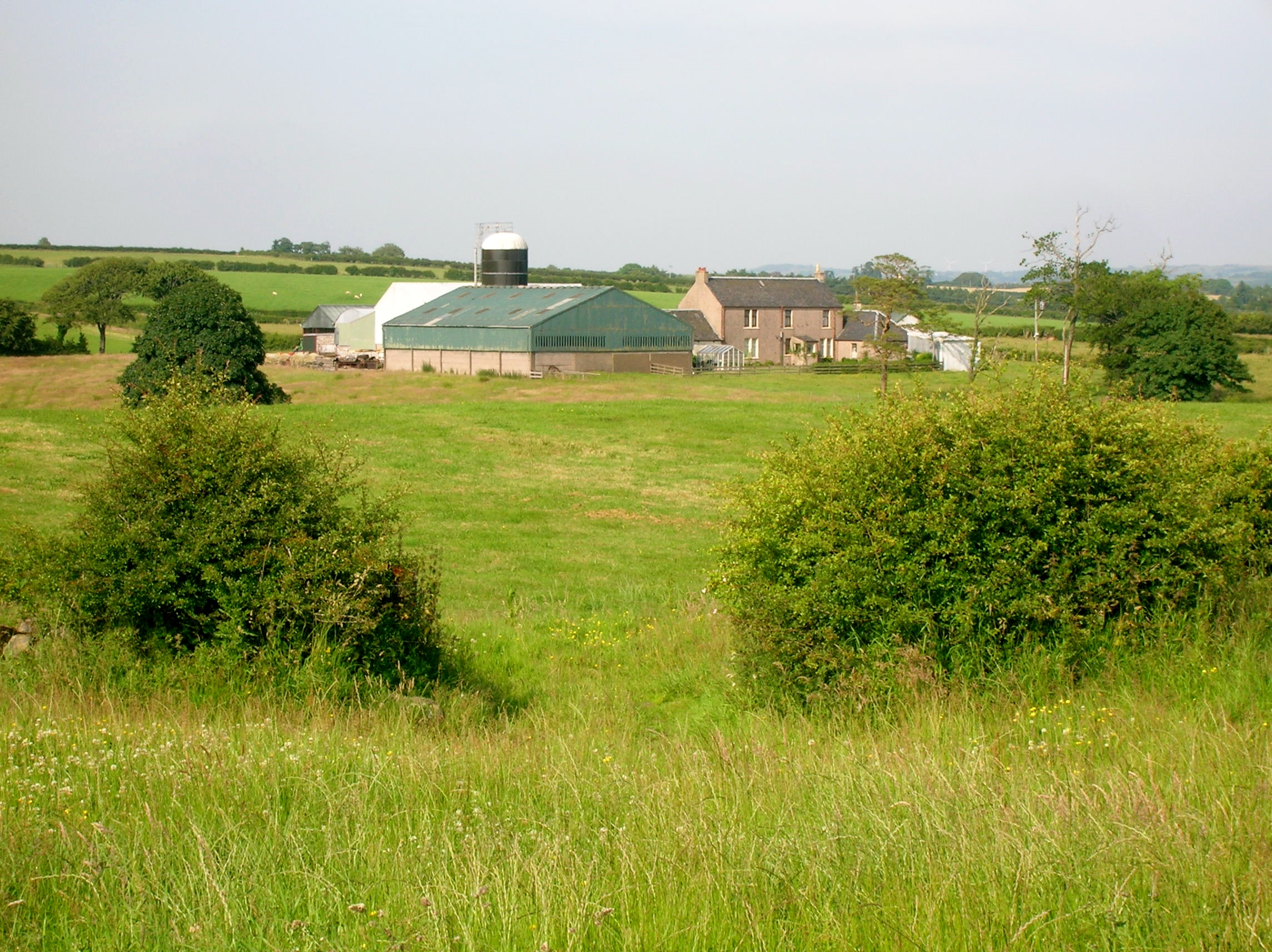
- Lands of Sevenacres

Site information
- Type: Lairds house
- Owner: Private
- Controlled by: Earls of Eglinton
- Open to the public: No
- Condition: Ruins

Location
- Shown within Scotland
- Location within Scotland
- Coordinates: 55.66777°N 4.65416°W
- Grid reference: NS 33162 44780

Site history
- Built: 16th century
- Built by: Montgomerie family
- Materials: Stone

The Lands of Sevenacres known locally as Snacres were originally part of the holdings of Kilwinning Abbey in North Ayrshire, Scotland. The Laird of Sevenacres's residence once stood at what became known as Little Sevenacres on the high ground above the farm of Sevenacres Mains, a short distance from Sevenacres Mill. The name "Sevenacres" may have derived from the size of the land holding of the mill itself.

== The History of the Lands of Sevenacres ==
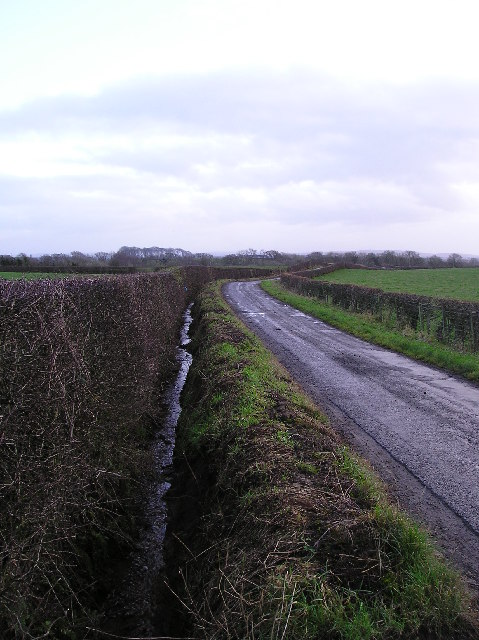
A view near Sevenacres Mains.

In March 1558 the Montgomerie family purchased the feu of £3 2s 8d the lands of Sevenacres from the abbot of Kilwinning Abbey. Prior to this time the family had only rented the property. Holding the feu gave the Montgomerie family rights to the minerals beneath the land, a hereditary possession, a fixed feu duty, etc. The Bannoch Burn rises near Sevenacres and runs down from here to enter the River Garnock at Bridgend in Kilwinning.

=== The Lairds ===
In 1558 Patrick Montgomery is the first recorded holder of the Lands of Sevenacres following the selling of the feu by the abbot of Kilwinning and by the end of the century he was a fairly well-off "Bonnet Laird". A "Bonnet Laird" was a petty landowner who wore a hat or bonnet like the humble working labourers.

William Montgomerie of Sevenaikers (sic) is recorded in 1562, but had died before 1612, for Thomas Montgomerie became heir to his father on 26 June 1673. The property appears to have passed from the family by sale or through marriage soon afterwards.

The Montgomeries of Sevenacres are thought to have been descended from the Montgomeries of Smithston and through them they would have been related to the Earls of Eglinton.

=== The Laird's house ===
Roy's map of circa 1747 shows the name Sevenacres applied to the site on the hill above what is now Sevenacres Mains. This elevated site had a roundel with a path running to it, a shelter belt and a substantial dwelling house with associated outbuildings. A small building is shown on the other side of the road. The dwelling later became known as Little Sevenacres. The house stood on what was then a direct route to Kilwinning and this road led directly to what is now Sevenacres Mains.

A limekiln is shown above Little Sevenacres on the 1856 map. By 1897 Little Sevenacres had ceased to be a farm, all but one of the old farm buildings were unroofed and the roundel and shelterbelt had been cut down.

=== Roundels and woodland ===
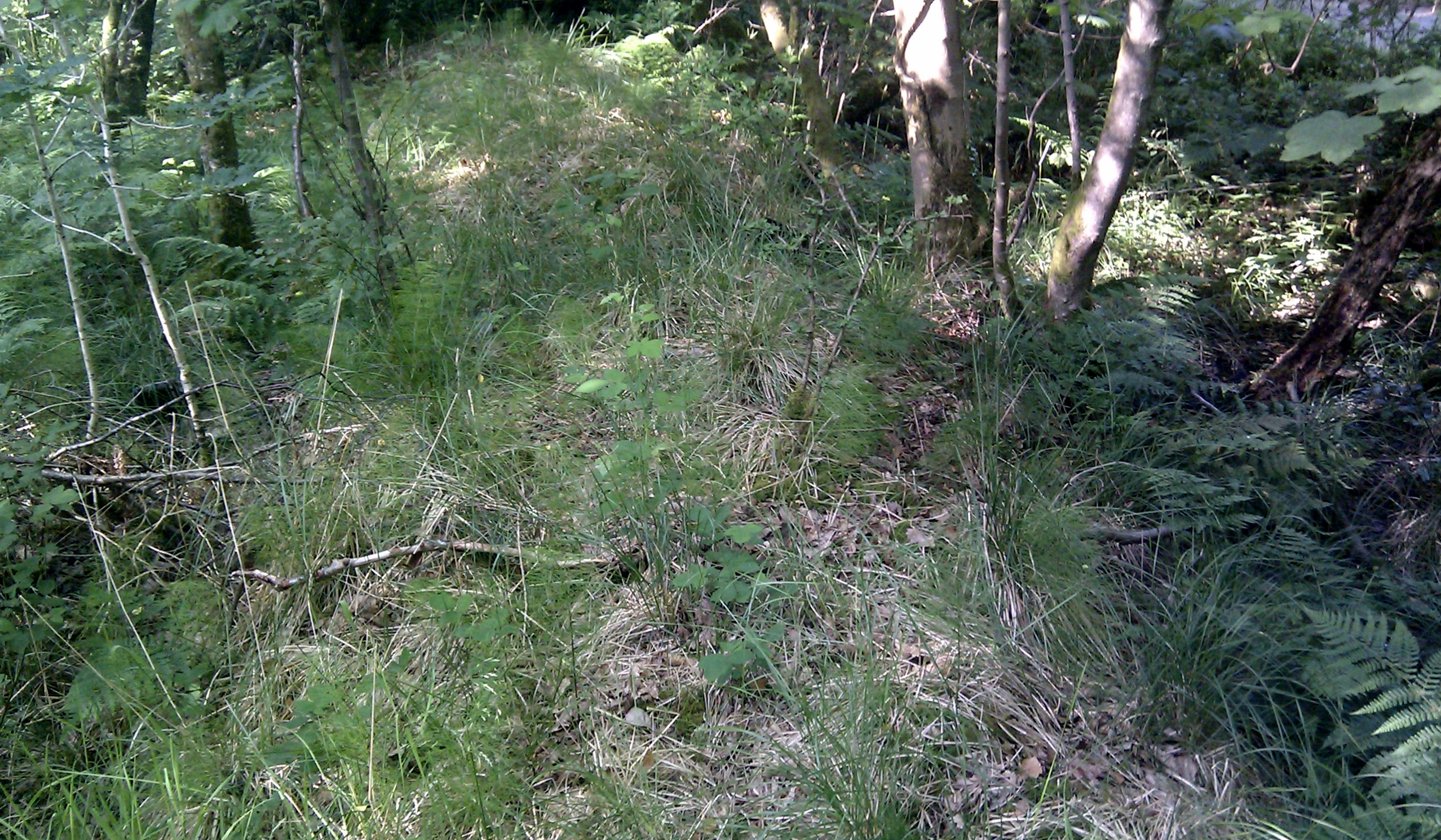
A section of the roundel bank in Sevenacres Wood with a diverse ground flora

Several plantation areas are present others have been felled. Unusually several roundels or roughly circular plantations are shown on the old maps at Little Sevenacres, on the road to Clonbeith, on the old road from Hullerhill and one that is now merged into the plantation within Sevenacres Wood. Roundels were often planted on estates as landscape features. The surviving roundel near Sevenacres House still has its bank and ditches that were built to keep stock from entering. The 1747 map by Roy shows a number of roundels on the Eglinton Estate lands between High and Mid Moncur Farms. The flora within the Sevenacres Wood roundel is much more diverse than the surrounding self-seeded plantation with old woodland indicators such as wood horsetail, hard fern, wood sorrel, enchanter's nightshade, etc. Sevenacres Wood appears to be of 19th-century origin and had a number of access tracks running through it.

=== Sevenacres Mill ===
Sevenacres Mill (NS 3336 4433) is said to have been one of the mills owned by the monks of Kilwinning Abbey, together with Craig Mill in the Lynn Glen and Dalgarven Mill. and it passed into secular hands with the purchase of the feu by the Montgomerie family in 1558. The location of Sevenacres Mill is marked from the early 1600s onwards. Members of the King family were millers at Sevenacres as well as at Dalgarven Mill. This old corn mill ceased production in the 1960s. William King was born to Thomas King and Barbara Neilson who are recorded on the 1755 baptismal records as living at Sevenacres Mill near Kilwinning. William went on to become the miller at Scroggie Mill and also worked as a farmer.

==== Etymology ====
A Scottish acre was equivalent to 1.3 English acres, 5,080 square metres, or 0.508 hectares. Being such a small land holding the name Sevenacres may refer to the original lands of Sevenacres Mill that are largely enclosed within a loop of the Lugton Water only and was later applied to the lands running towards Lylestone. The site is known as "Acres" on a few of the older maps and the recorded name 'Sundkers Mill' may also relate to it. It is worth noting that the Scots word 'Aiker' can also refer to a cereal crop such as barley, oats, etc.

=== Quarrying ===
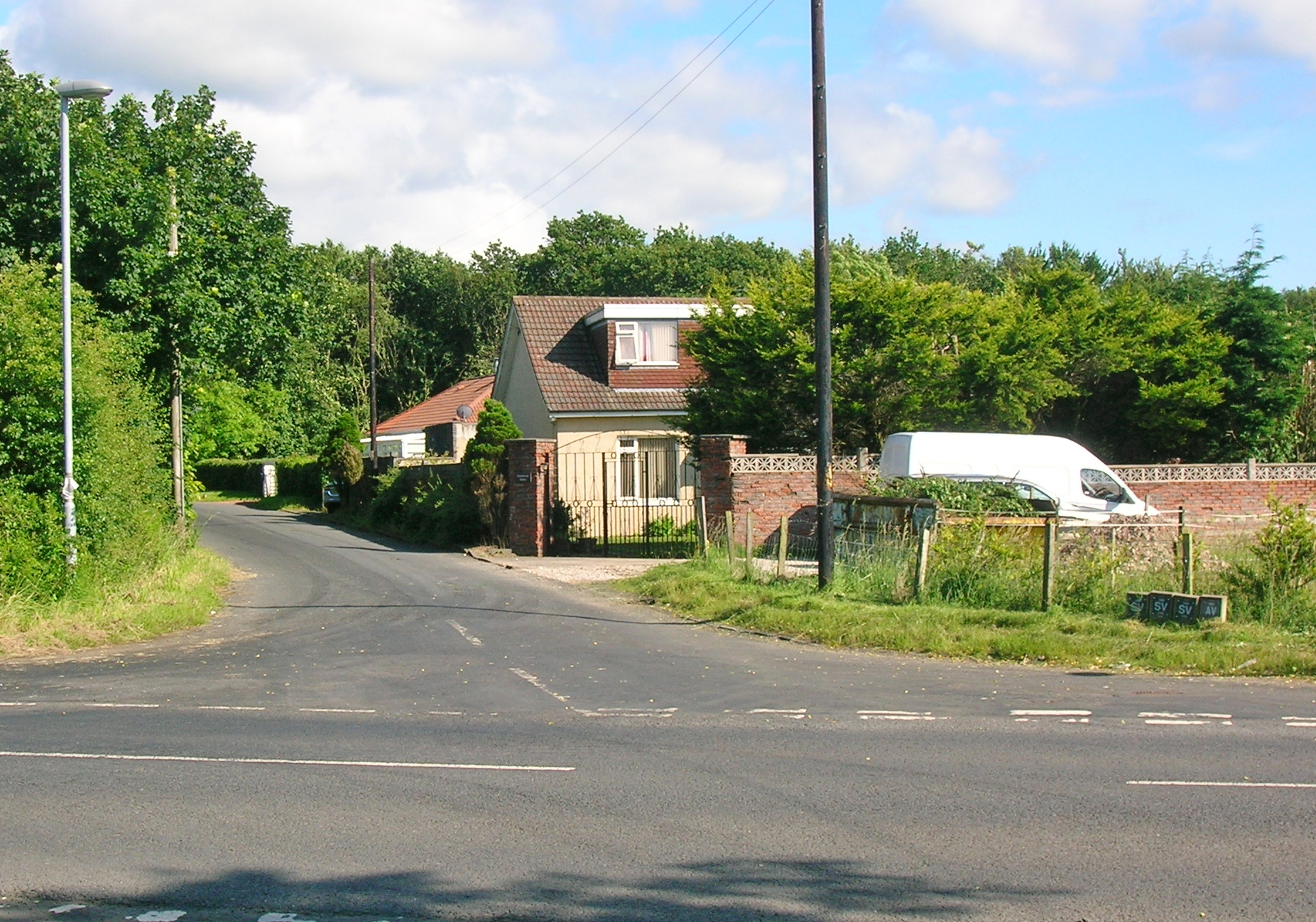
Sevenacres House near the old Sevenacres Quarry.

The 1856 shows the limestone quarry at Sevenacres. In 1897 and 1909 a narrow gauge 'tramway' route is shown that ran down from the Sevenacres limestone quarry passed Sevenacres Mains and linked with the mineral freight line above Sevenacres Mill that ran down to the Dirrans in Kilwinning. In 1897 it was not operational, however in 1909 the track had been relaid and a crane at Sevenacres was used for transhipment. More recently a Bauxite mine was located near Sevenacres Mill.

== Cartographic evidence ==
Blaeu map based on Timothy Pont's map of the early 1600s shows "mill" marked in approximately the correct place on the Lugton Water and nearby is a mill named "Sundkersmil". Roy Military Survey map of Scotland, 1747–55, shows the mill on the Lugton Water within the recognisable tight bend of the river and two habitations above it and the name Sevenacres Mill. Armstrong's map of 1775 shows two habitations and the name as simply 'Acres'. Ainslie's map of 1821 simply marks 'Acres' next to the river. The 1820 map by Thomson shows Little Sevenacres and Sevenacres, the latter being surrounded by plantations. The name Sevenacres Mains was only added later to distinguish the farm from Sevenacres House, the quarry managers dwelling at Lylestone.

== Communications ==
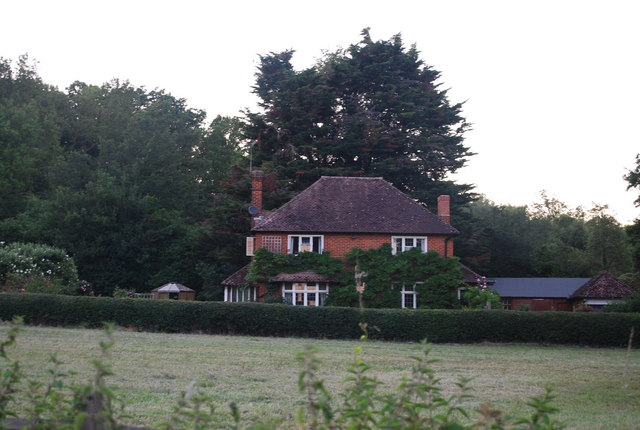
Sevenacres Cottage.

Thomson's map of 1820 shows Sevenacres and Little Sevenacres on the main route from Bridgend in Kilwinning, up over Corsehill to Five Roads and up passed Red Boiler to High Moncur and finally to a junction with the Beith to Burnhouse to Dunlop Road at Giffen Castle.

An old route also once ran from near Bannoch, up passed Crofthead and Hullerhill to join the road to Clonbeith near Sevenacres.

== Archaeology ==
In the 1880s when excavations linked to the building of a mineral railway were taking place a drain or narrow covered tunnel was located. It was built of sandstone blocks with large slab covers and was held together with a basic clay mortar. At one end was a large circular stone, 5 feet (1.5 metres) in diameter, with a central hole that was plugged with a stone. Beneath this stone was a shallow cavity without any contents.

== See also ==
- Kilwinning Abbey
- Dalgarven Mill
- Monkredding
- Lylestone
