= Lylestone =

Coordinates: 55.673275°N 4.660087°W

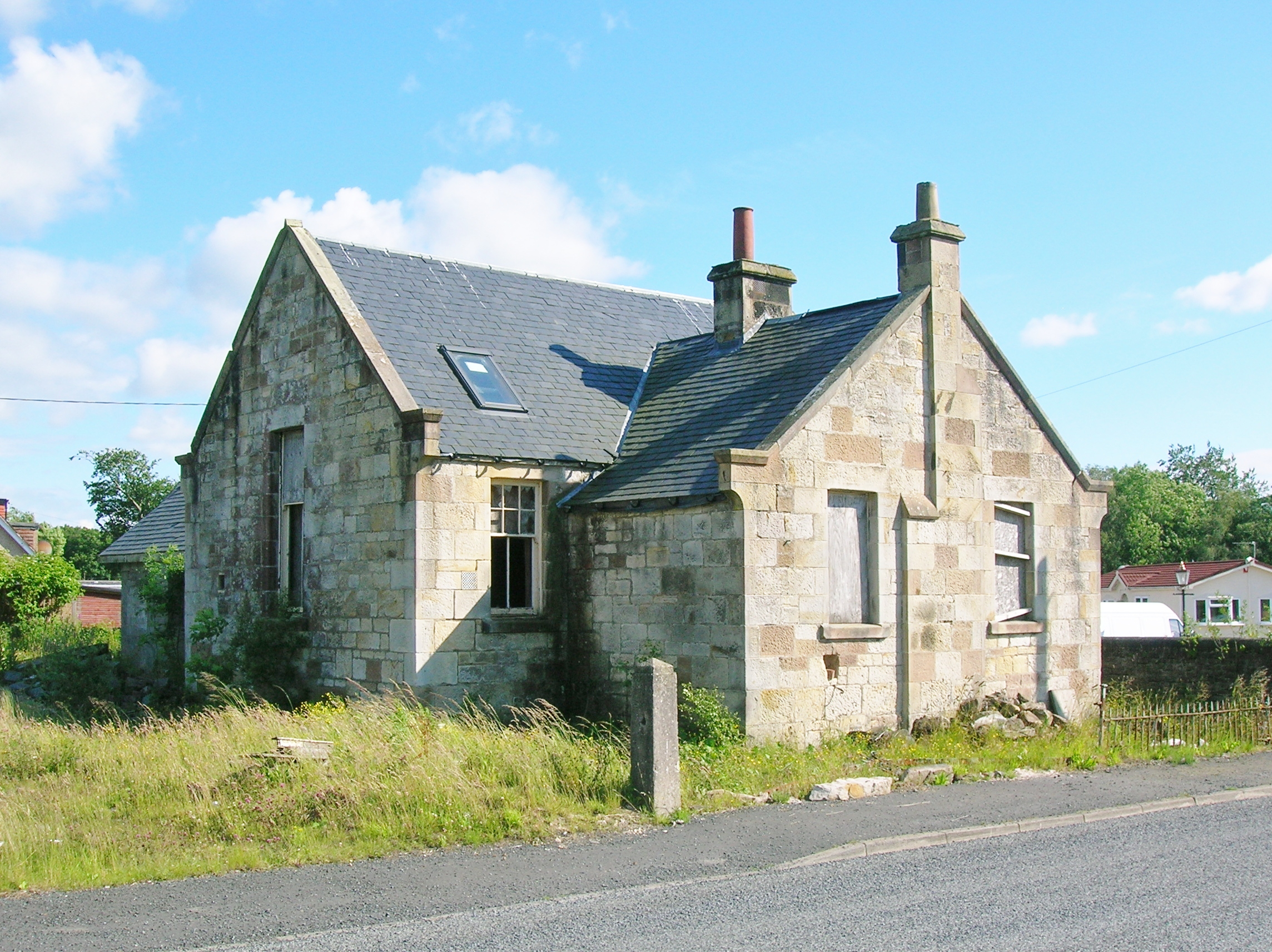
- The old school at Lylestone

- Location within North Ayrshire
- OS grid reference: NS 32814 45407
- Council area: North Ayrshire
- Lieutenancy area: Ayrshire and Arran
- Country: Scotland
- Sovereign state: United Kingdom
- Dialling code: 01294
- Police: Scotland
- Fire: Scottish
- Ambulance: Scottish

Lylestone is a hamlet in North Ayrshire, Parish of Kilwinning, Scotland. The habitation is situated between Kilwinning and Auchentiber on the B778. It was originally built as a row of housing for quarry workers.

== History ==
Lord Lyle was a local landowner, connected with the Montgomeries of Eglinton by marriage; Lord Nicholas Montgomerie, had married the daughter and only heir of Lord Lyle about 1500. Lylestone Farm stands on the minor road to Auchenmade and Drumbuie that branches off from the B778 and runs past the old school. The name does not indicate a stone, but refers to the farm settlement or 'ton', 'toun' or town of Lyle.

=== Lylestone Row and school ===
The ruins of the old Lylestone Row still stand (2012) on the roadside beyond Monkredding House, opposite to the old Monkredding Quarry and close to the old Sevenacres Quarry. In the 19th century the row contained circa nine dwellings with several buildings on the opposite side of the road. These dwellings were home to railway workers and quarrymen from the nearby extensive freestone and limestone quarries and coal pits. At least three smithies once stood in the quarries near to the row and a mineral railway ran up to the site, running through the woods, parallel to the main road from the old Kilmarnock to Dalry mainline railway. A freight line or tramway also once ran up through Lylestone to a limestone quarry near to High Monkredding. By 1958 the OS map shows a new row had been built at the 'triangle' close to the school and that the old Lylestone Row and nearby dwellings had been abandoned. In 1970 the OS map shows the new Lylestone Terrace and the old Lylestone Row in ruins.

The Lylestone school buildings still stands at the end Lylestone Terrace, undergoing conversion into a private dwelling. In 1906 a local paper records that Miss Stewart, teacher at Lylestone Infant School, was promoted to the staff of Eglinton District School, Kilwinning. The school is first shown on the OS map in 1909.

=== Cartographic evidence ===
In 1747 the settlement of Lylestown is indicated on Roy's map with Monk Redden (sic) nearby. Thomson's map of 1832 shows Lysleton (sic) and at this date the course of the present day B778 did not exist and the road stopped at Monkreddan House. Lylestone Cottage sits on the B778 next to old limestone quarries which are on both sides of the road. The 1897 OS map shows a Quarry House and a Sevenacres House at the junction to Clonbeith at Sevenacres Wood. The Quarry House has since been demolished.

== Industry ==
=== Lylestone, Monkredding, Sevenacres and other quarries ===
A mineral railway ran up to the site, running through the woods, parallel to the main road from the old Kilmarnock to Dalry mainline railway. A railway or tramway also ran up to a limestone quarry near to High Monkredding and another railway in 1909 ran from the Lyslestone limestone quarry near Darmule Farm to the Lylestone Brick and Pipe Works at High Gooseloan that were connected to the old Dalry to Kilmarnock railway line. Coal pits were located near to the Lylestone Row and also close to Golconda, the old Monkreddan lodge. A tramway is shown in 1909 as running from Sevenacres Quarry to Sevenacres Mill and from there to Fergushill. A limestone quarry also existed at nearby Goldcraigs.

Progressive closures of the quarries led to the decline of this once thriving local community in the 20th century. The old flooded Monkredding Quarry at NS329452 is a Provisional Local Nature Conservation Site as designated by the Scottish Wildlife Trust in co-operation with North Ayrshire Council.

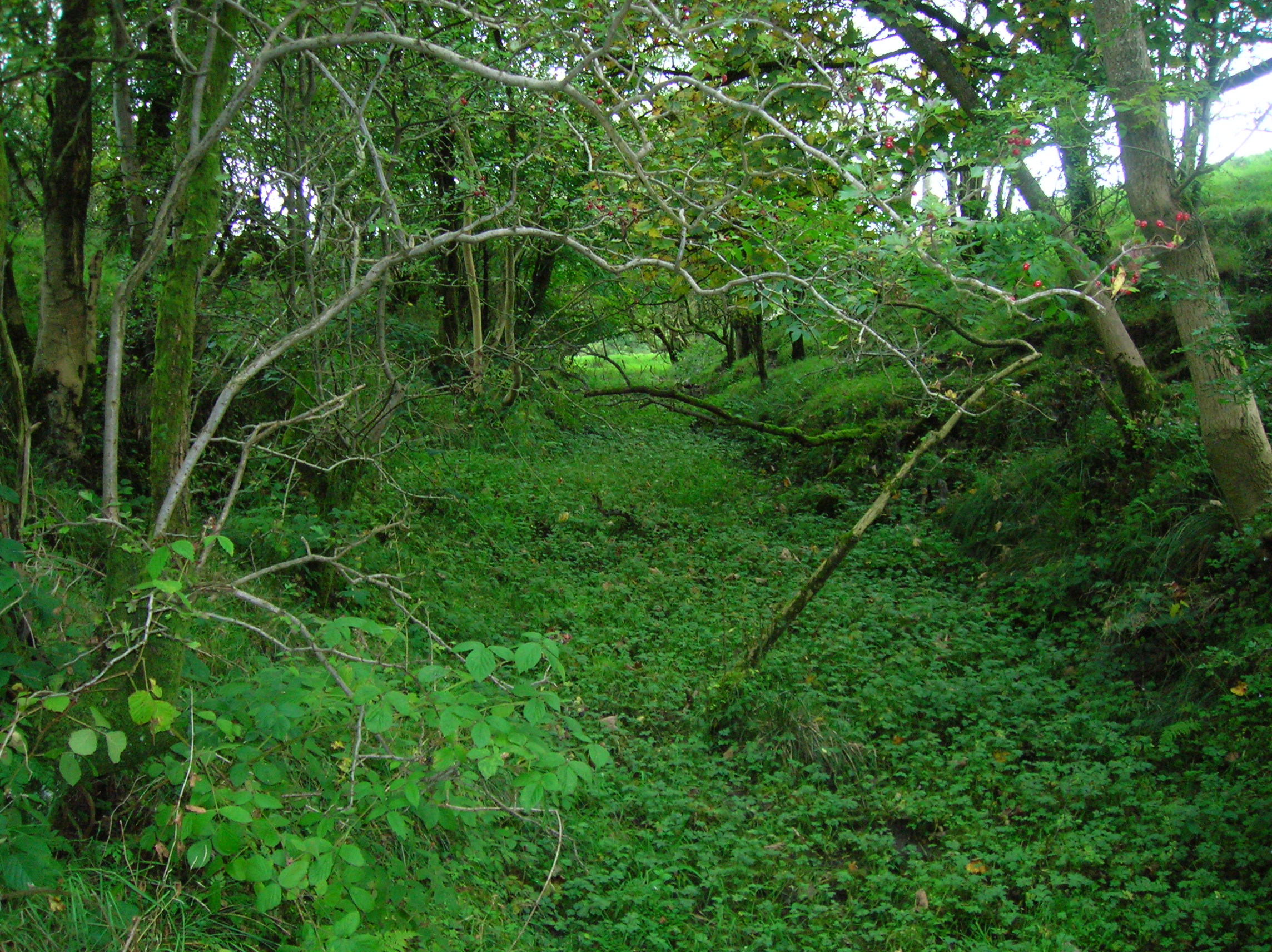
The old route from Lylestone to High Monkredding and its limestone quarries

Coal workings and wastes at Monkridding near Kilwinning were recorded by Timothy Pont as far back as 1608, extending between 50 acres (200,000 m^{2}) and 100 acres (400,000 m^{2}), associated with the limestone. As stated, stone and coal workings came close to the mansion house of Monkredding and the old main entrance at Golconda House had to be moved.

"In the lands of Monkridding there are old coal wastes, connected with the limestone series, from 2½ to 3 feet in thickness, which had been opened several hundred years ago and they extend over between 50 and 100 acres. This coal-bed must have been of great value in those days of defective machinery from the peculiar position of the coal and lay of the land, as it was all wrought water-free and from the old waste there is now a constant run of fine water. There is a great extent of the lower seam yet to work. Among the Blair papers were found receipts for coal from this locality dated 200 years ago."

Monkredding Quarry, with its associated smithies and railway, was a freestone quarry with associated hamlet, limestone and coal pits; as shown on the OS 6-inch (150 mm) to the mile map. The Inspector of Mines' Report in 1874 lists Monkredding amongst the twelve operating mines in the Irvine area.

The Monkridden No.1 coal seam was abandoned before 1879 and No.2, Wee coal and limestone was still working in 1877. Goldcraig's limestone quarry closed in 1891 and the Wee coal working was abandoned in 1927. Lylestone had Wee coal and fire-clay workings. The upper quarries were abandoned in 1918.

The OS map shows that the quarry at High Monkredding had become a fish pond with a boat house and a contiguous plantation by 1909.

== Views at Lylestone ==
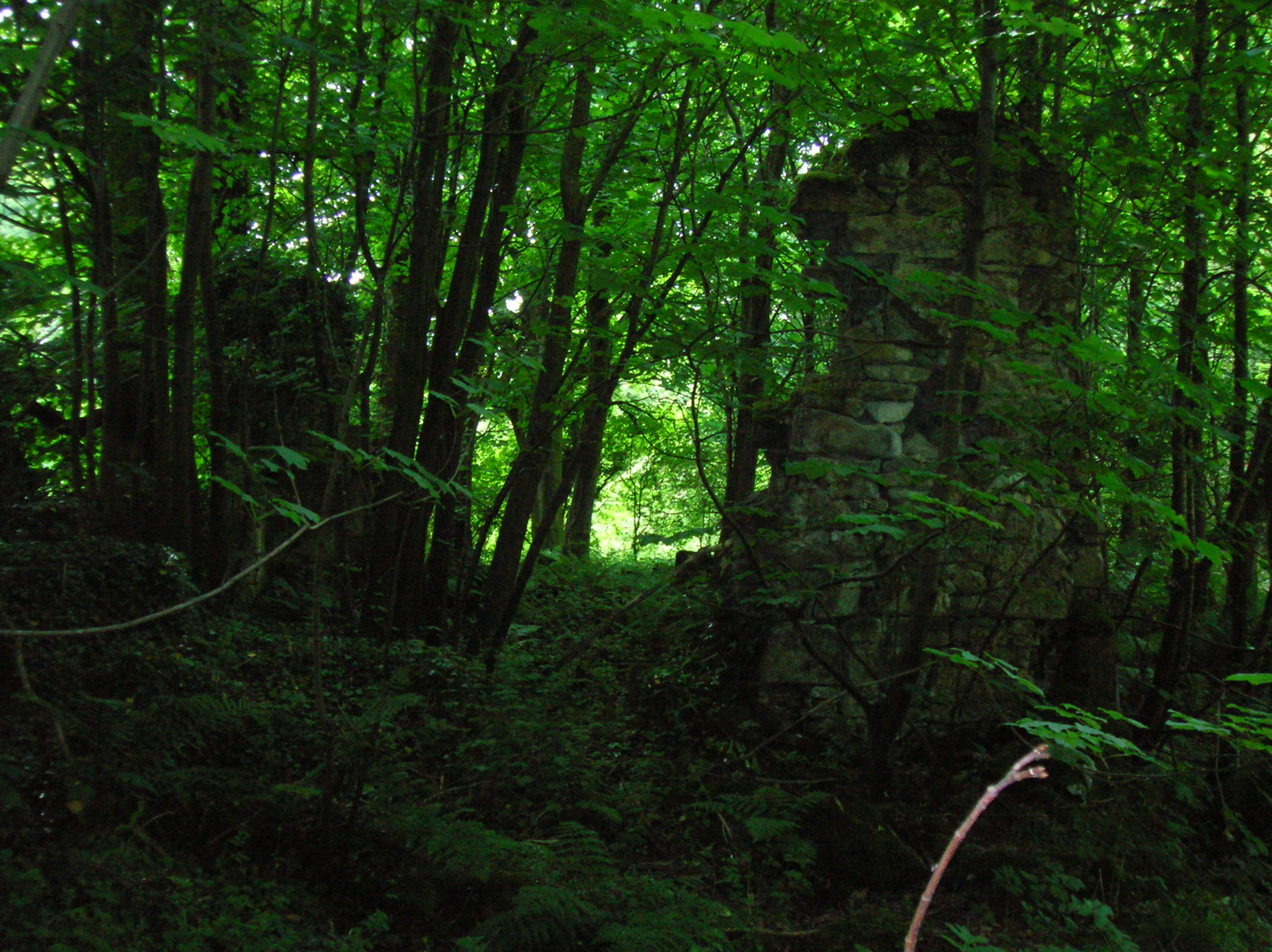
Ruins of the old Lylestone Row

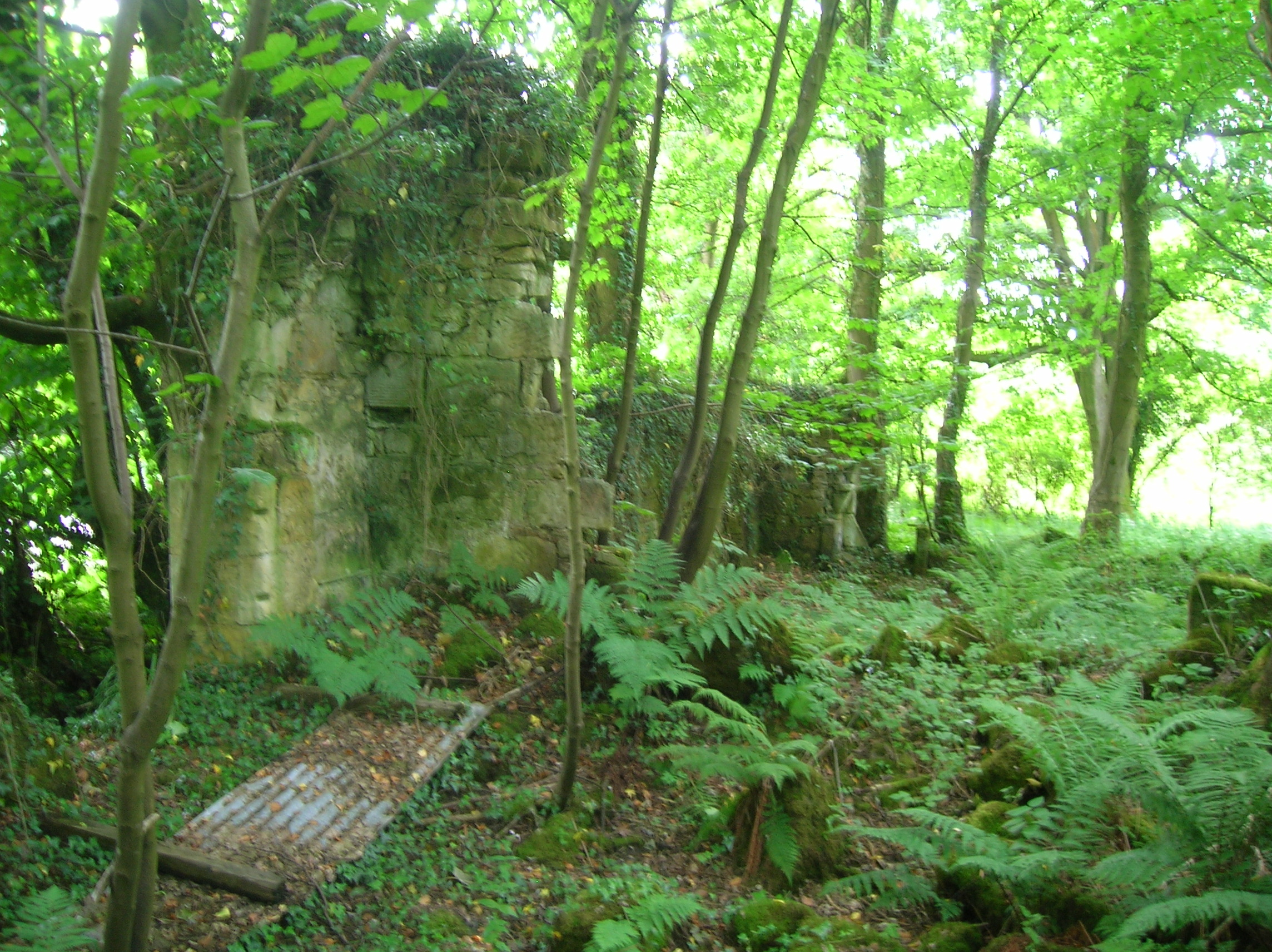
Ruins at the row

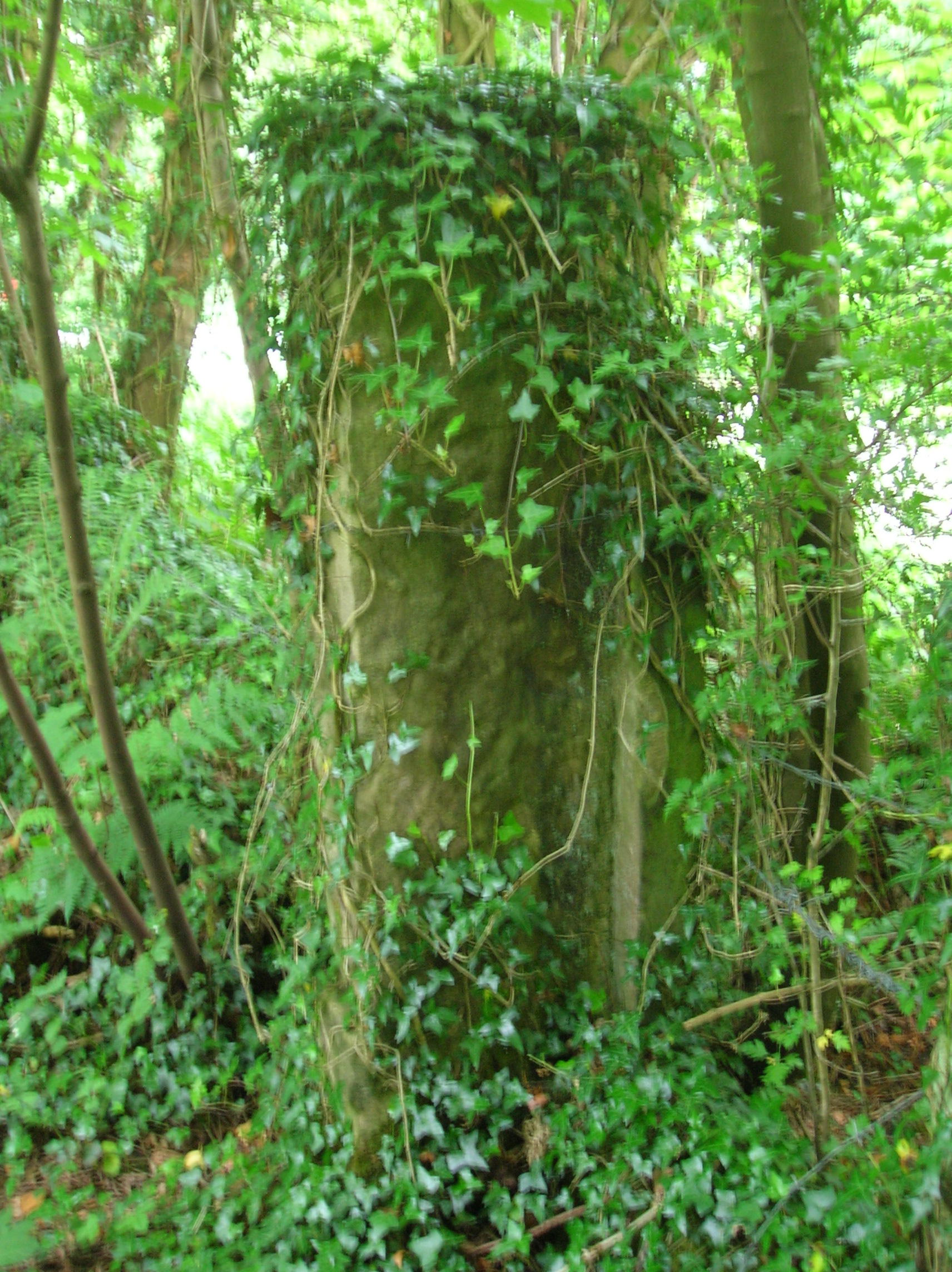
An old doorjamb at the row

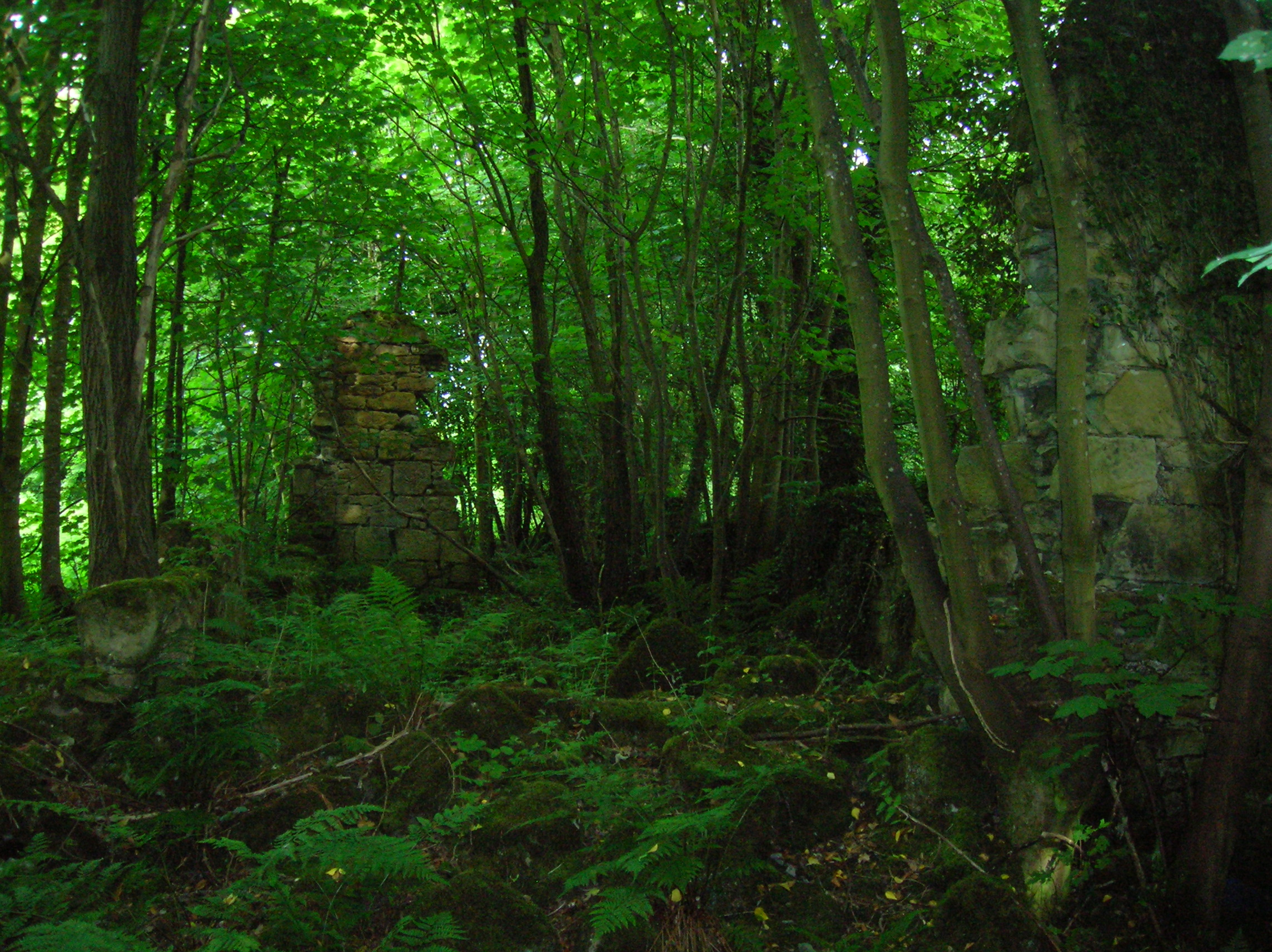
Ruins in 2010

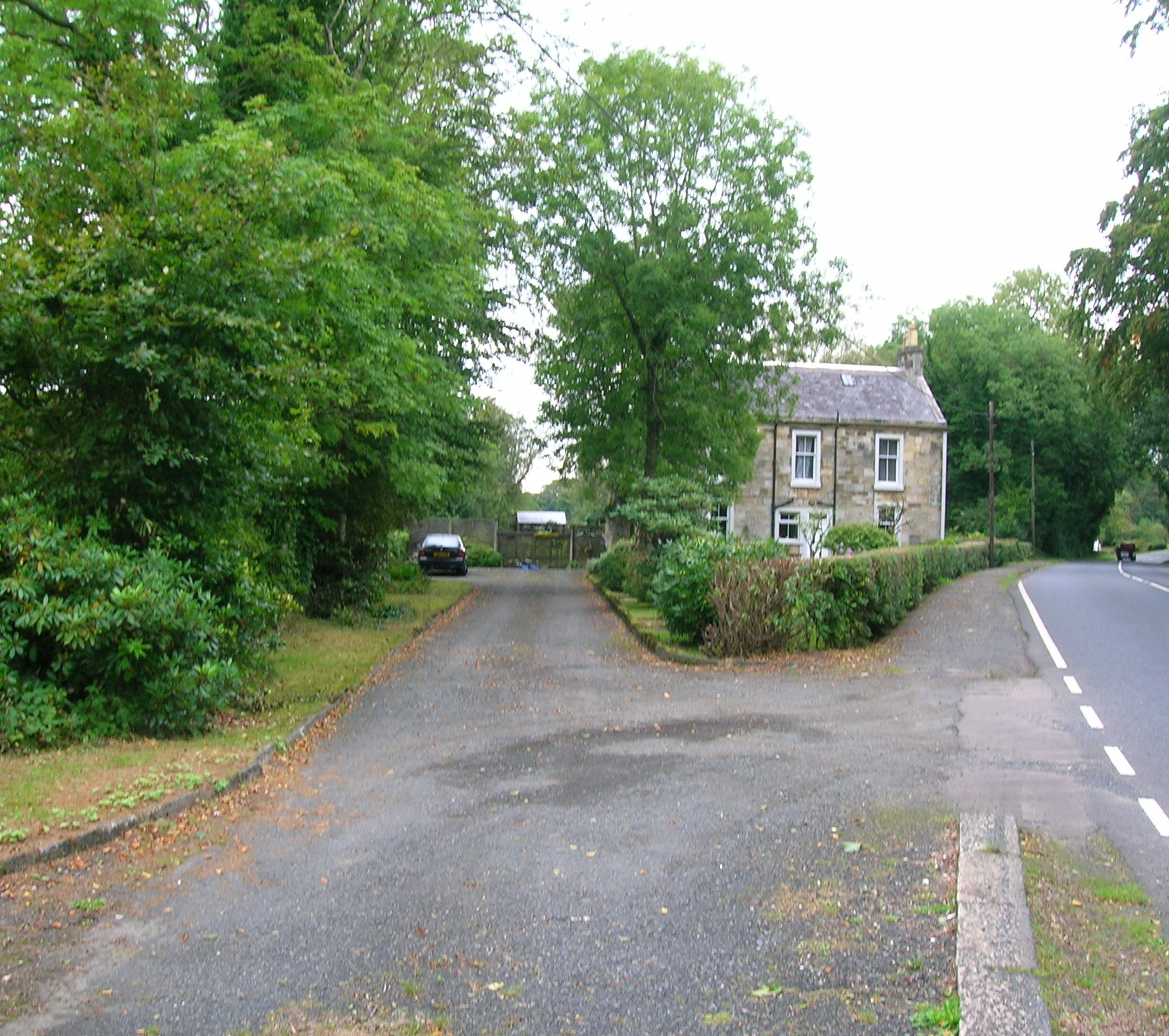
The old Monkredding entrance at Golconda House

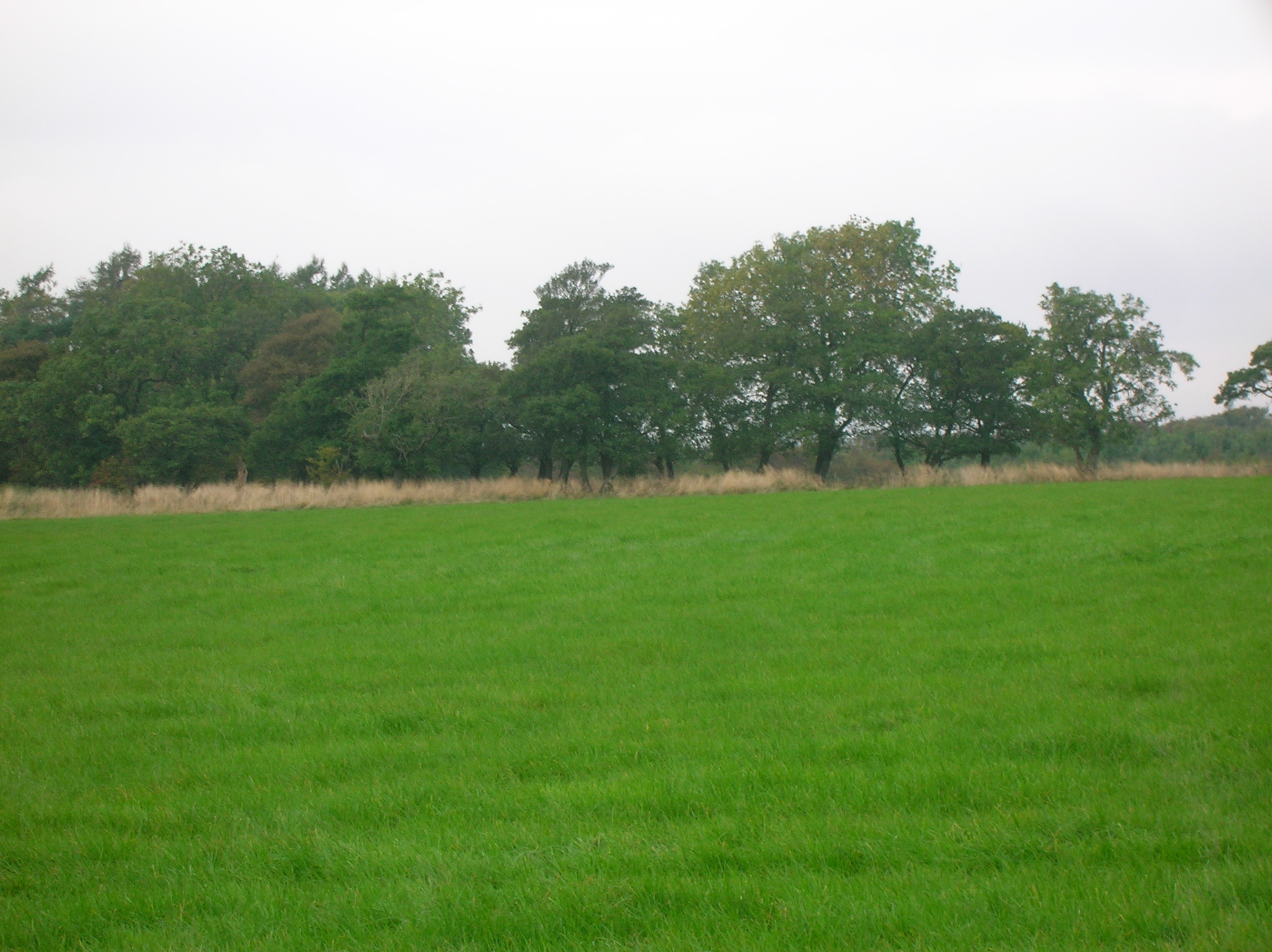
The site of High Monkredding with the site of the old quarries behind

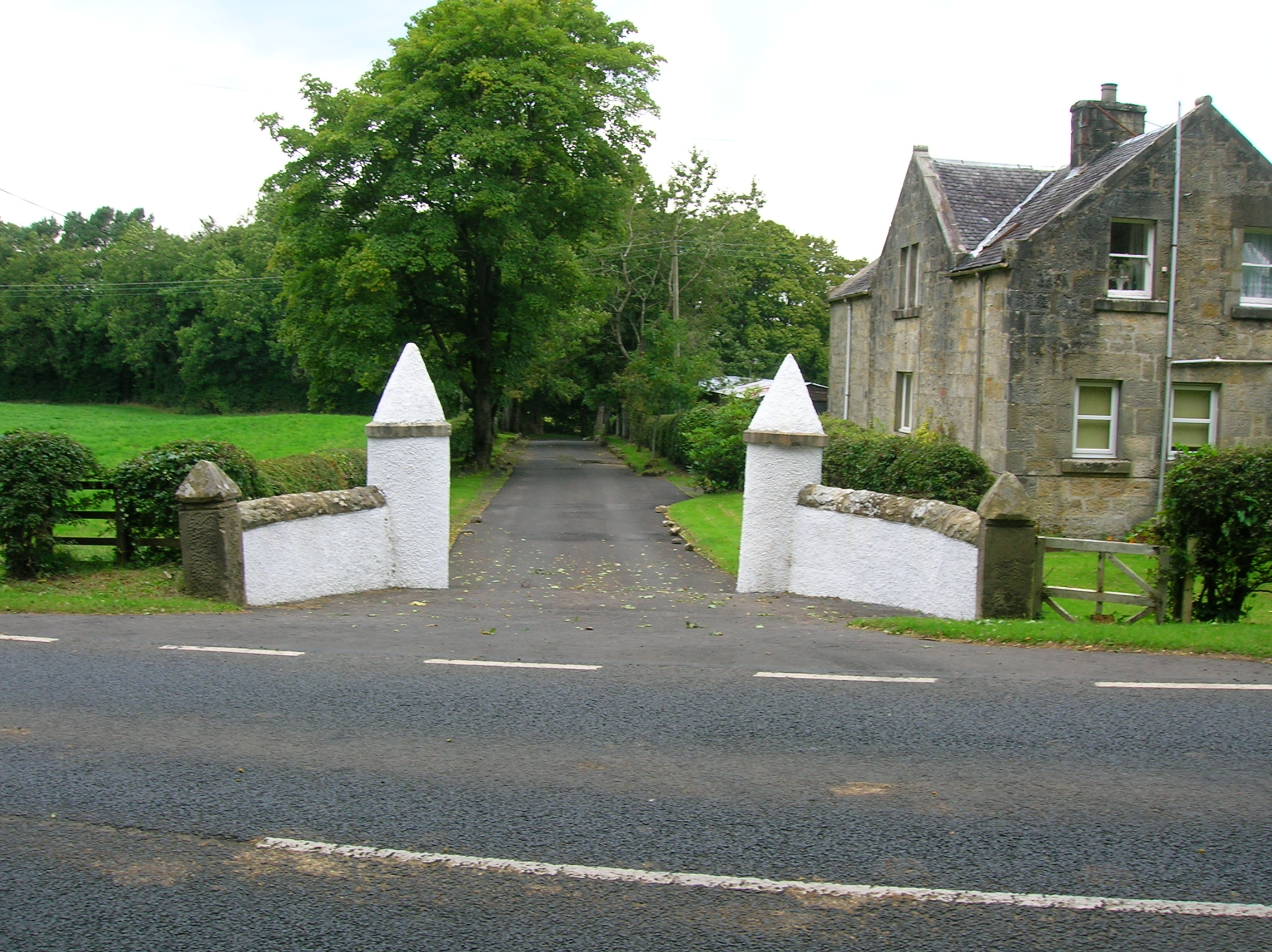
The present day entrance to Monkredding House

== Micro-history ==
Monkredding House, North Ayrshire lies nearby(NS 3240 4534), a property originally held by the Tironensian monks of Kilwinning Abbey, was the 'Monk's Garden', the rest home for the brothers.

Auchenmade railway station was located approximately one mile north of Lylestone. It served the hamlet of Auchentiber and the surrounding rural area as part of the Lanarkshire and Ayrshire Railway.

Sevenacres Mill is fairly close by, known by the locals as 'Snakers Mill.' A small estate existed near here in the 1560s, held by William Montgomery, said to be descended from the Montgomeries of Smithstone.

The old roads to Lylestone branched off at Goldcraigs Toll and the other ran via Hullerhill Farm, running up from near the Bannoch Road and up via Crofthead Farm before continuing to Clonbeith. All of the Bannoch Road to Clonbeith via Hullerhill is now abandoned.

== Lylestone Farm and Terrace ==
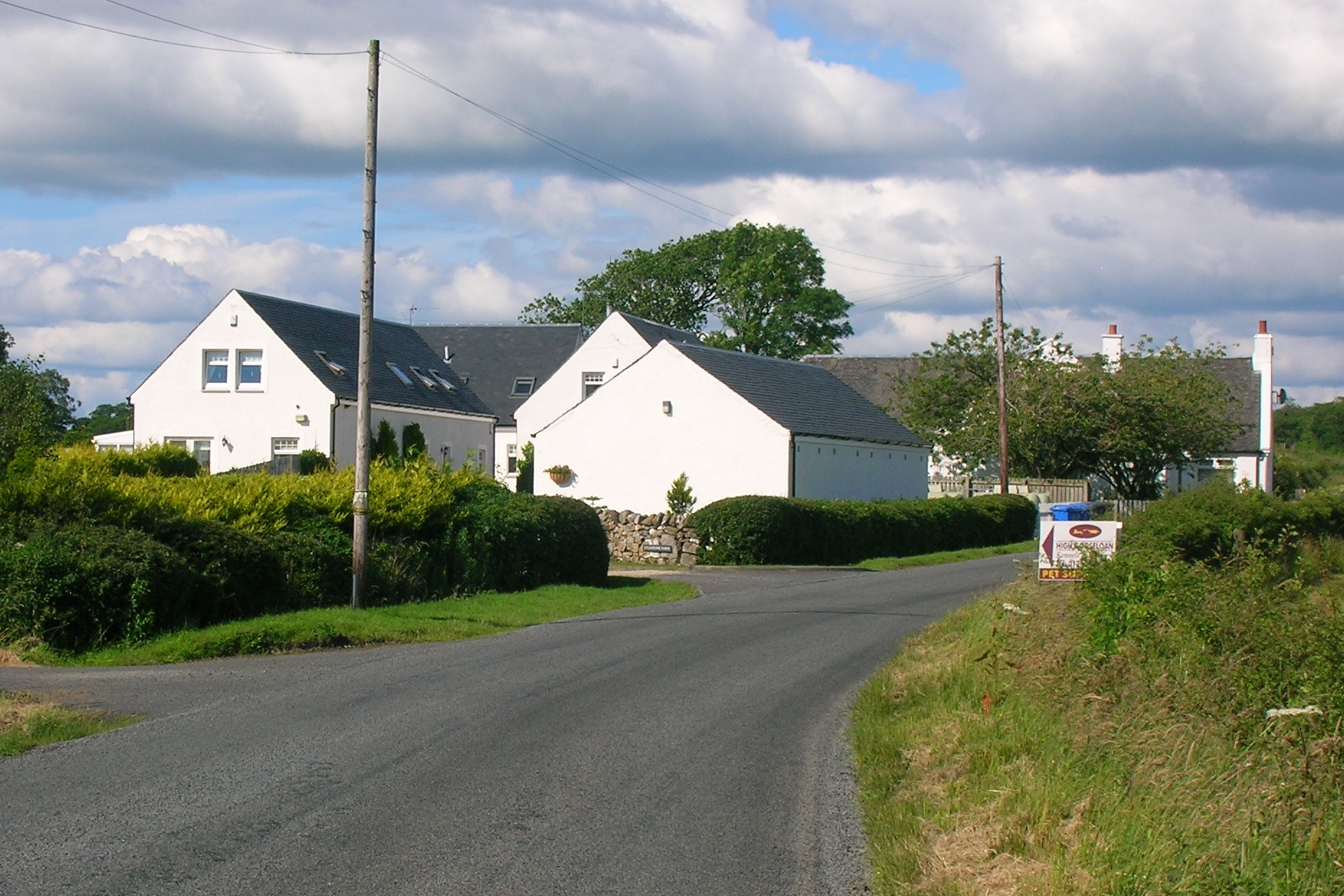
Lylestone Farm

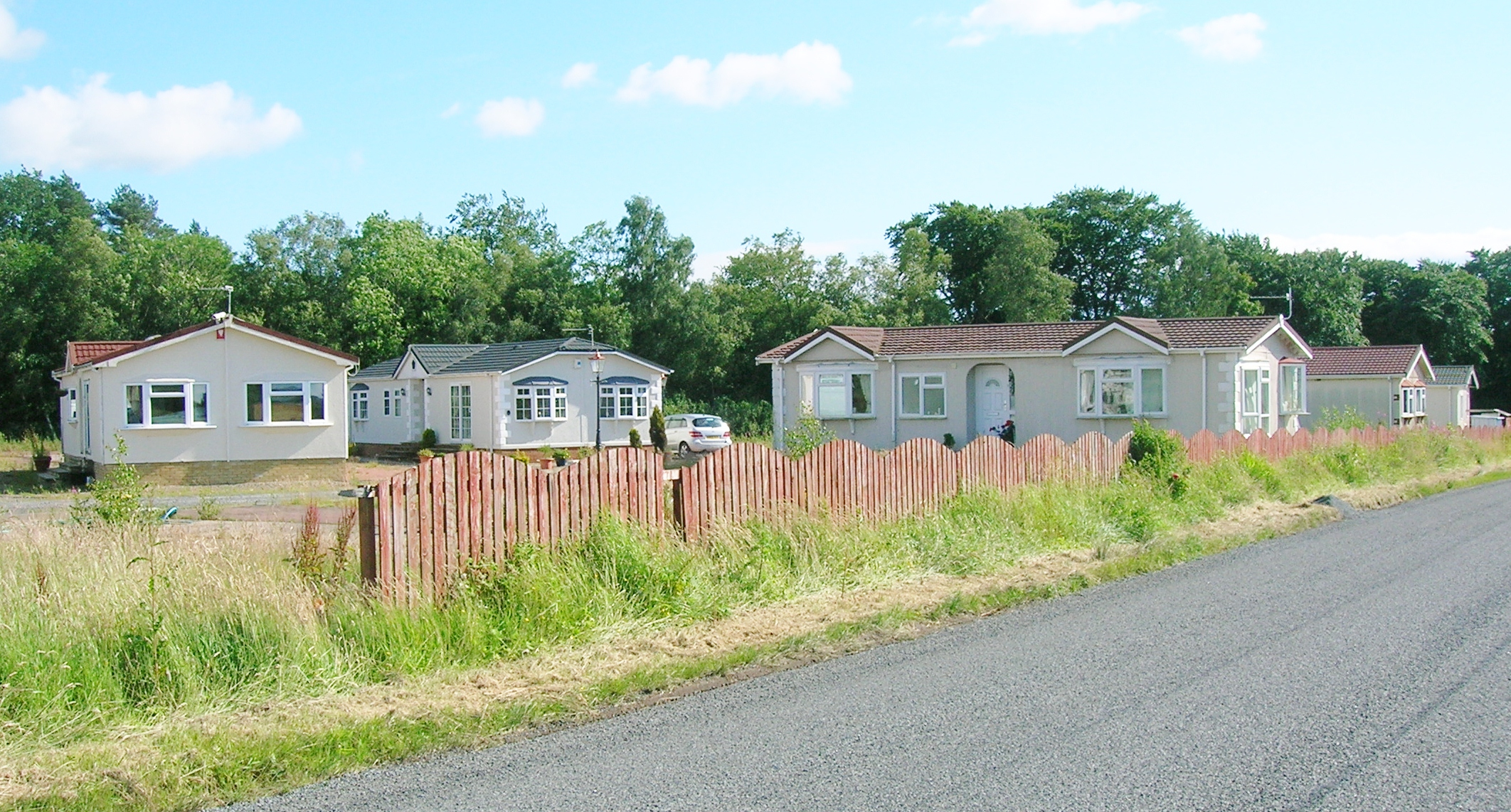
Lylestone Park

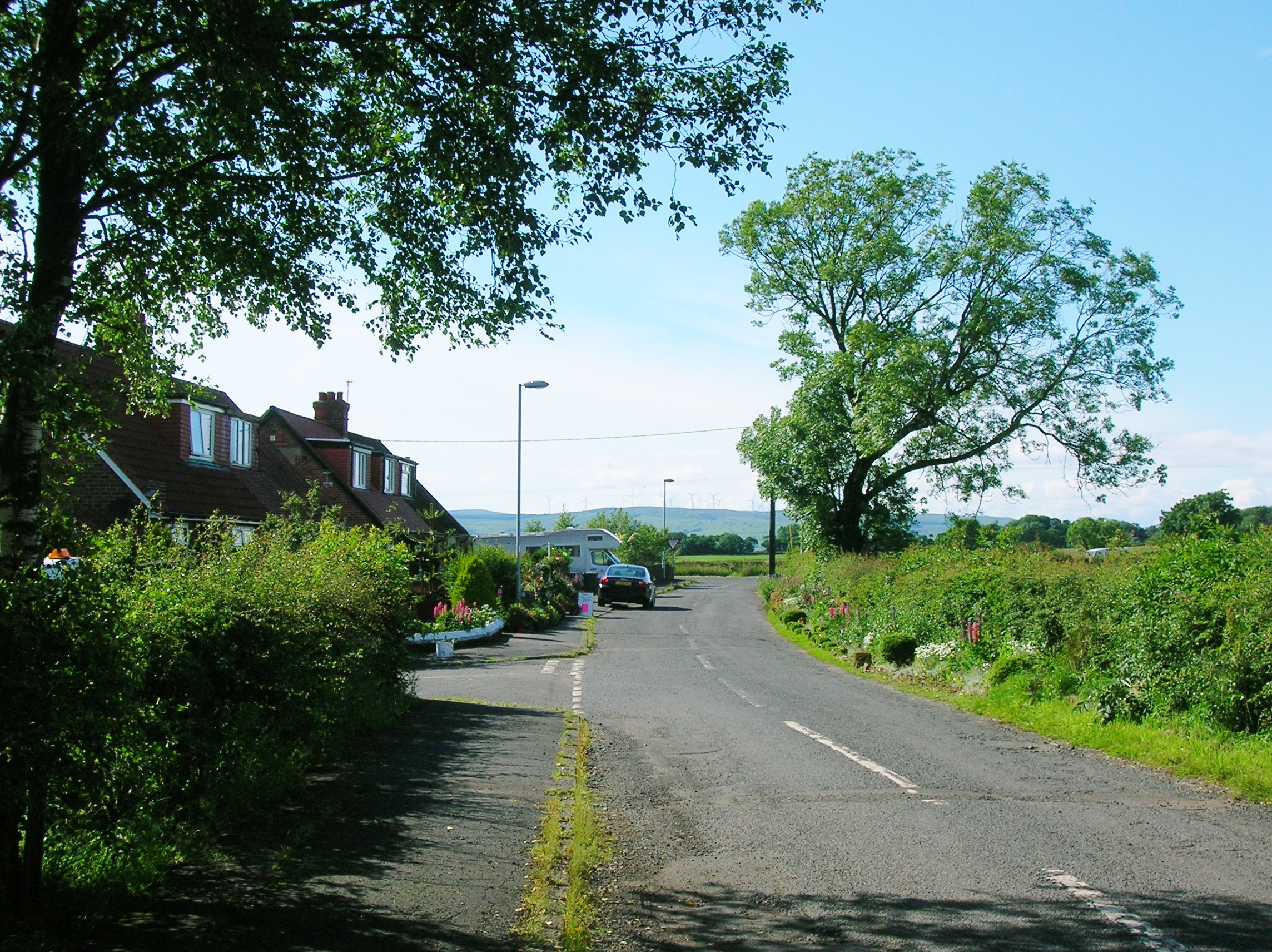
Lylestone Terrace and road

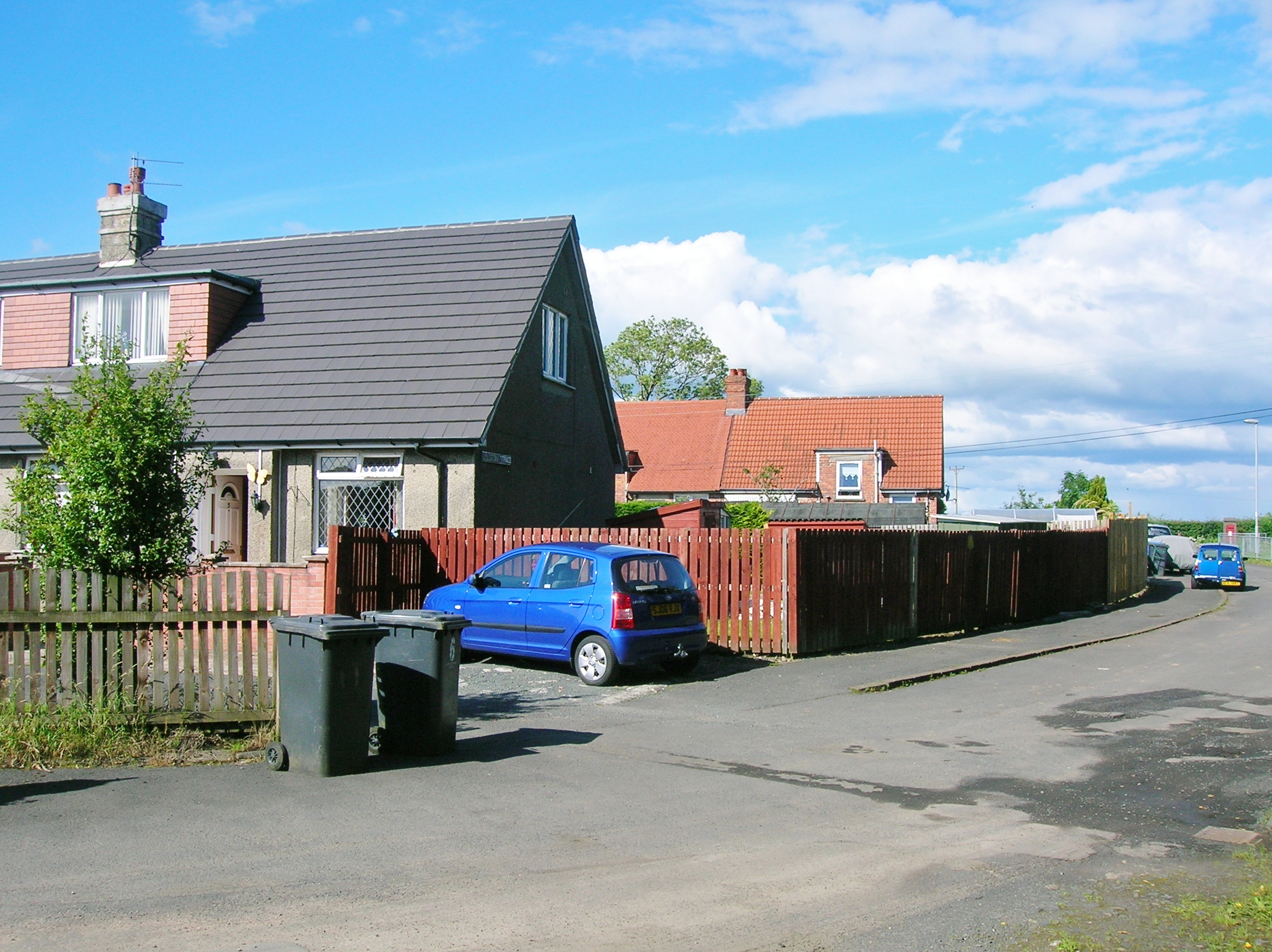
The two terraces

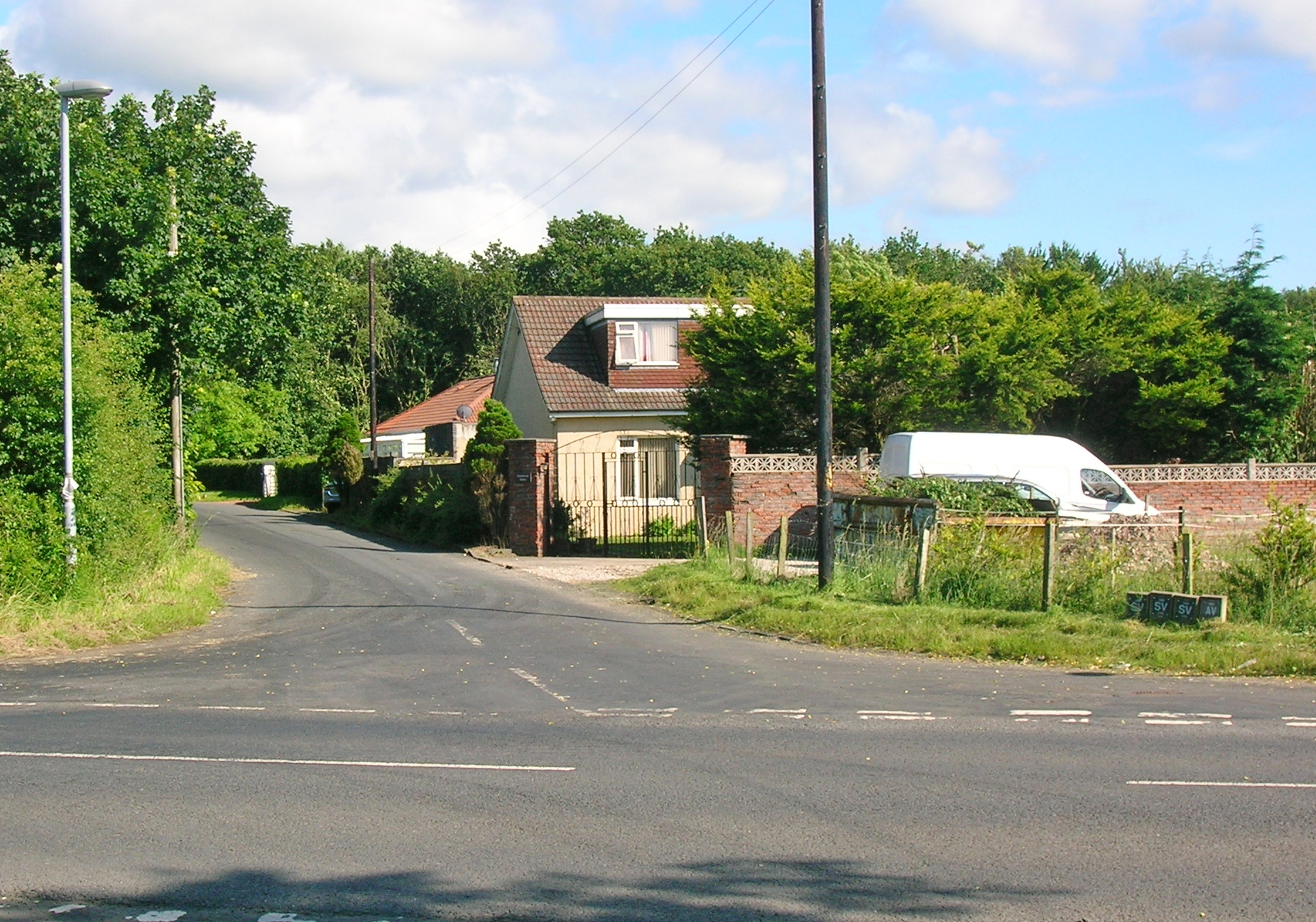
Sevenacres House, the quarry manager's dwelling

== See also ==
- Monkredding House, North Ayrshire
