= Monkredding House, North Ayrshire =

House in Kilwinning, North Ayrshire, Scotland

Monkredding
- Kilwinning, North Ayrshire, Scotland; UK grid reference NS4084831699
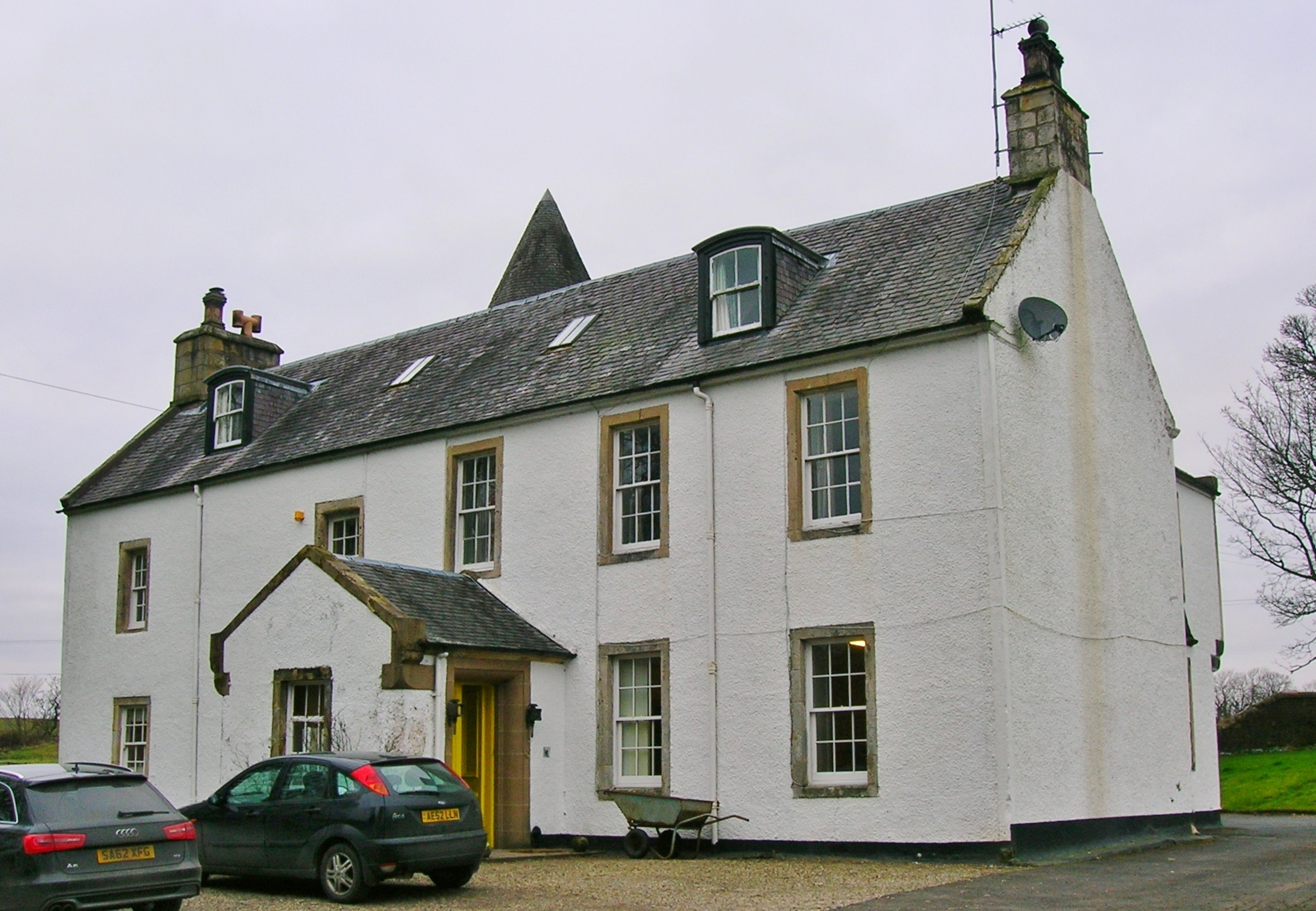
- Monkredding House

Site information
- Owner: Private
- Controlled by: Nevin Clan
- Open to the public: No
- Condition: Excellent

Location
- Coordinates: 55.673489°N 4.666906°W
- Grid reference: NS3240 4534

Site history
- Built: 16th century
- Built by: Thomas Nevin
- In use: Inhabited
- Materials: Freestone

Monkredding (NS 3240 4534) formed a small estate in the Parish of Kilwinning, North Ayrshire lying between Kilwinning and Auchentiber on the B778. The property was originally held by the Tironensian monks of Kilwinning Abbey and was the 'Monk's Garden', the rest home for the brothers. Monkcastle near Dalgarven was the abbot's country retreat. Monkredding remains in good condition and is in use as a private house in 2010.

== History ==
Between 1539 and 1545, the Nevin family obtained the lands of East and West Monkredding from Alexander, Abbot of Kilwinning. Thomas Nevin was the first secular proprietor of the lands, "part of the ancient halydom of Kilwinning, which about this time was beginning to be parcelled out by the Abbots, to whoever would best remunerate them for the ostensible gift, foreseeing that their own possession was becoming doubtful and unsteady." The old name of the place is stated as Moncarden or Monks Garden.

Savio records that Thomas Nevin in 1539 feued the lands of East Monkredding; in 1543 those of Guslone and Bannach; and in 1545 those of West Monkredding and Gaitmureland. As well as security of tenure, feuing gave the right to the feuar to exploit any minerals on his lands. Thomas Nevin was able to hew and sell the coal on his feu lands. His family became so rich that they were able to build themselves a tower house at Monkredding.

=== Monkredding House ===
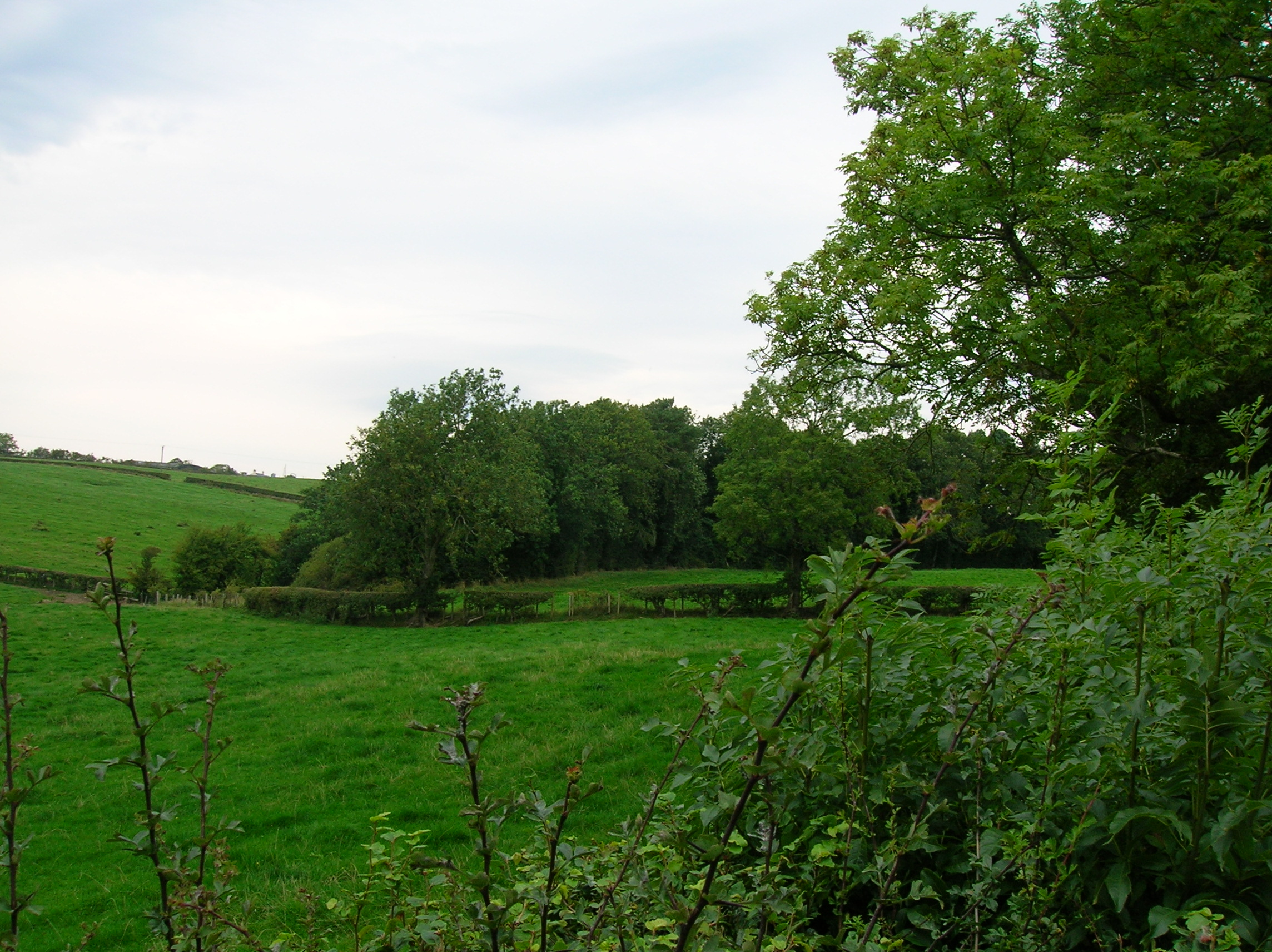
Surroundings and woodlands at Monkredding

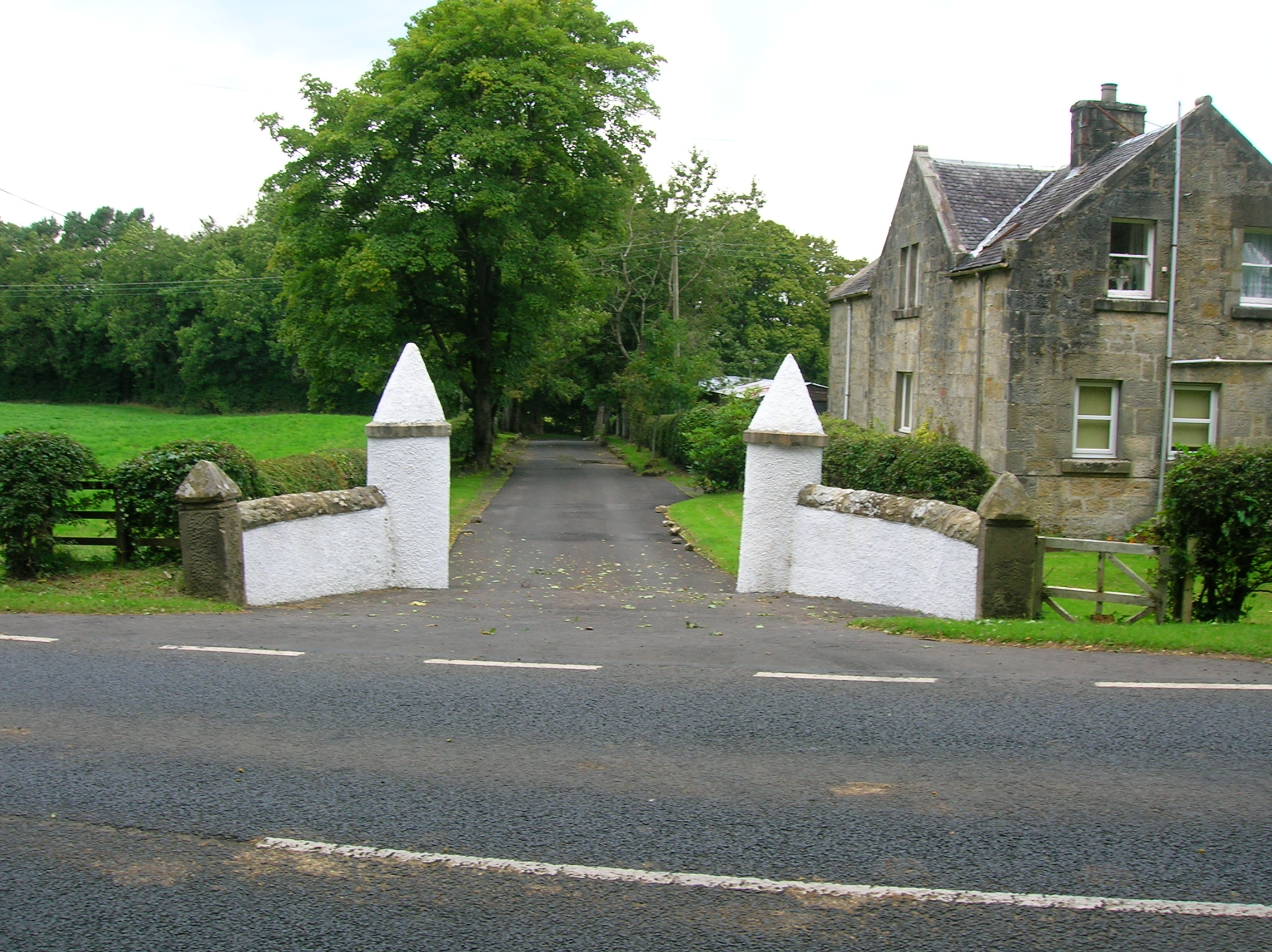
The present day entrance lodge.

Thomas Nevin, the first laird, was successful in the coal mining trade and was wealthy enough to start building the present mansion. Monkredding House, sometimes written as Monkreddin, is a small, much-altered L-shaped fortalice, now with a large modern wing to the rear, dating from 1905, and built to plans by Hugh Thomson, JP and architect working in Saltcoats, who also built the porch and probably the Edwardian lodges.

Monkredding's modern form surrounds three sides of a square, open to the north. The west wing and stair-tower are ancient. The west wing bears a date stone '1602 or 1605' in the north gable, whilst the remainder was added in 1638, this date being inscribed on a dormer pediment in the west wall; the lower floor is vaulted. Whitewashed roughcast harling covers the masonry; the roof has been lowered; the circular stair-tower has been significantly raised in height. No dormers are now present and the crow-steps have been removed. The 17th-century building was enlarged and re-orientated in the early 19th century when the principal facade and central entrance were extended south. Monkredding House is B Listed.

As stated, the tower was heightened, possibly returned to its original height, the work being part of the restoration carried out by the MacAlisters, including the enlargement of one of the two loopholes as a window. Alexandrina MacAlister saw the backdoor as originally being the front entrance and saw the building as once possibly serving as a peel tower.

The house is described as a ruin by McMichael in 1895 and an unroofed building, annotated as a ruin, is shown on the 1st edition (1858) of the OS 6-inch map, sheet xii.

==== The grounds ====
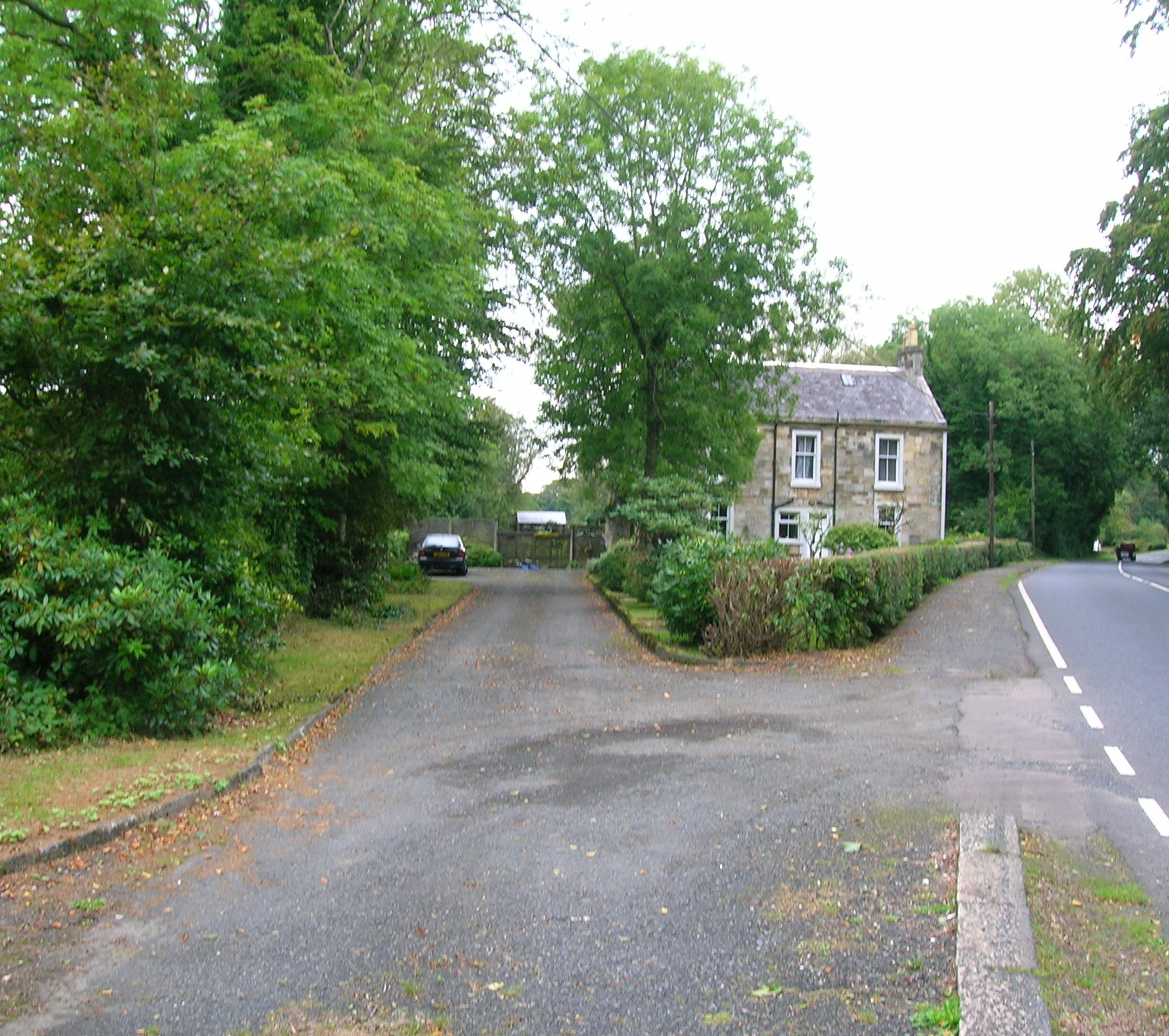
The old main entrance and the 'Golconda' lodge off the Auchentiber Road

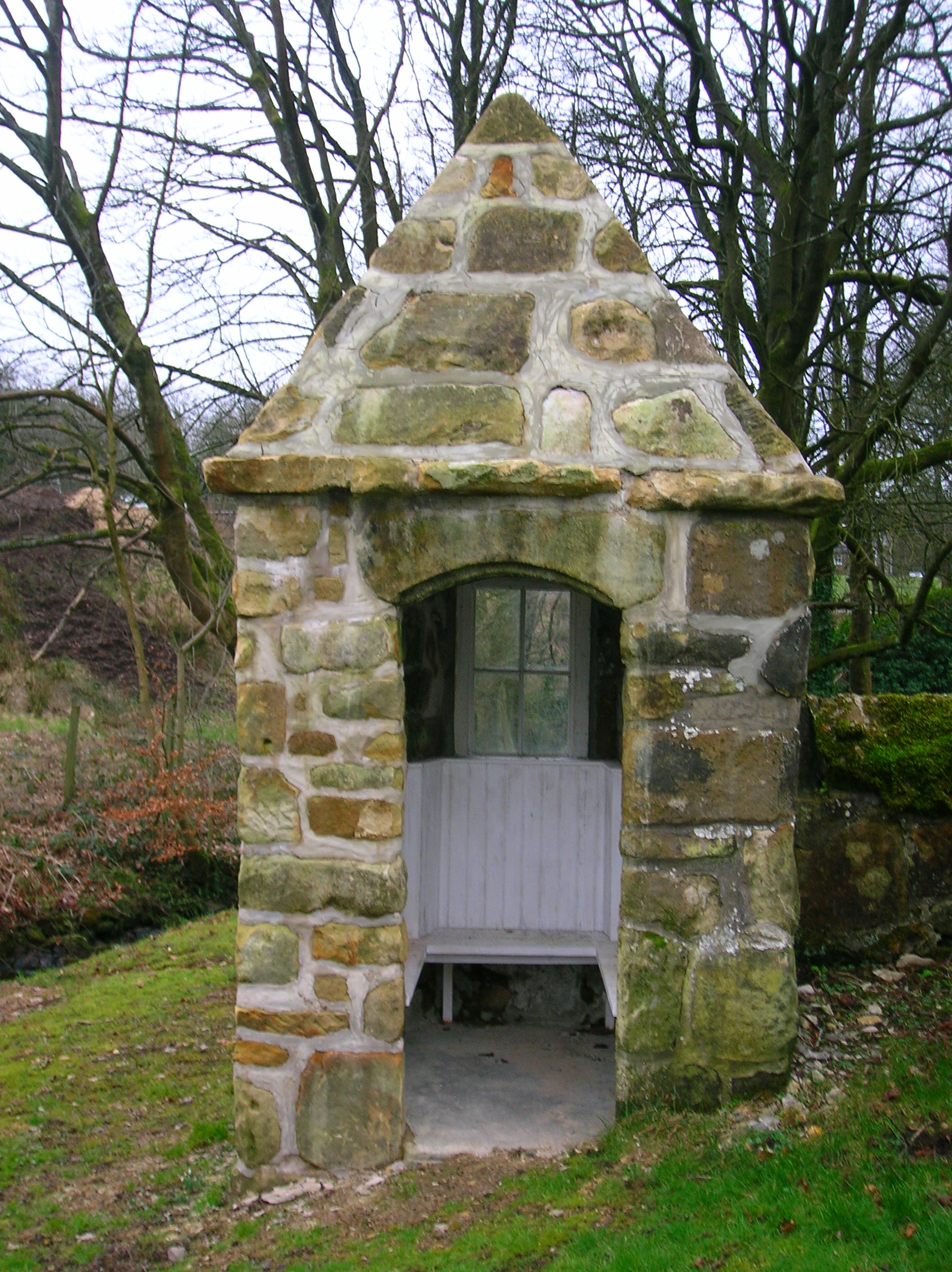
The summerhouse

The 1775 map shows a mansion house with substantial woodland policies, as does Thomson's map of 1820. In the 1920s a large beech tree fell at Monkredding and was found to be around 400 years old. Several large beeches still stand on the roadside opposite the old entrance, part of the old policies before the new road was built.

A C-listed summerhouse is recorded at NS 323 454 The OS maps show that the first entrance off the Auchentiber Road, with its lodge, 'Golconda' was abandoned, probably due to limestone workings and the present day entrance with its Edwardian Monkredding Lodge was built to replace it. Before the turnpike road was built the entrance was off the ancient Kilwinning to Beith Road near Laigh Gooseloan that ran onwards via Jameston and Drumbuie. The 1832 Thomson map shows an access running directly up to the house along the route of the present road. Golconda is a ruined city in south-central India, west of Hyderabad and capital of an ancient kingdom (c. 1364-1512). The connection is not known.

=== The estate ===
The estate consisted of some 700 acres (2.8 km^{2}) and eventually increased to over 1,000 acres (4.0 km^{2}), comprising in all twelve farms (nb. contemporary spelling): viz. Monkredding, East and West, Hullerhill; Crofthead; Bannoch; Gooseloan; Corshill; Gaitmuirland; Nether Mains; Boutriehill; Lylestone; and Goldcraig.

In 1691 the Hearth Tax Rolls record the following people and hearths on the estate: Monkroding housse 6; John Kilpatrick 1; John Langwill 1; Janet Reid 1; John Lockart 1; Robert Montgomrie 1; Meran Kilpatrick 1; John Reid 1; John Niving 1.

== The Monkredding lairds ==
=== The Nevins ===
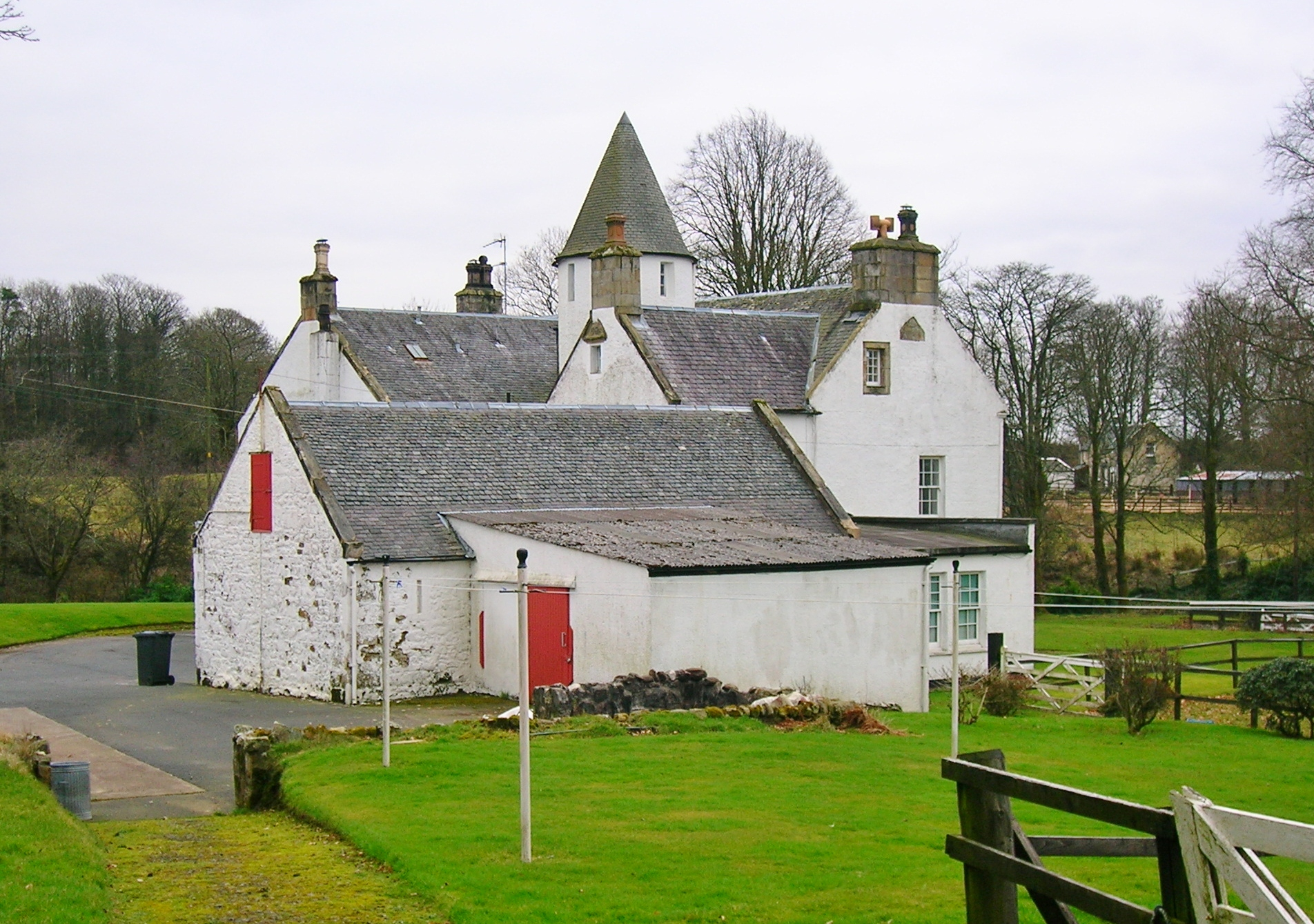
The house and outbuildings from the rear.

The surname was spelt Nevin, Nevins, Nivens, Nivens, Navin, Newin, Nevane, Niffen, Nifen, Nephin, Niving, Neving, Neiven, and Nivine. Two Old Irish etymologies have been proposed, one meaning "bone" (presumably from the nickname of a large-boned progenitor) and the other meaning "little saint". It is recorded in Ayrshire and Galloway from the end of the 13th century.

The small tower house of Monkredding House near Kilwinning was held by the Nevins from 1532, when acquired by Thomas Nevin and his wife Elizabeth Crawford, in the late 17th century, being acquired by the Cunninghams of Clonbeith by 1698. These Nevins were related to the Nevins of Kirkwood. Branches of the Nevin family also held lands at Oldhall, Auchenmade, and Kirkwood.

Circa 1562, in support of the Reformation, Andrew Nivin (sic) was a signatory to the Ayr Bond of the Congregation. He was regarded as one of the 'new men', a 'Bonnet Laird', that is he was the son of a Kilwinning Abbey tenant-turned-feuar.

Hugh Nevin died in September 1677. Agnes Dick had been his spouse. A will, dated at Over Kirkwood, 28 August 1677, states the said umquhile Hew Nevin of Kirkwood, he ordains that his body be buried in the churchyard of Kilwinning in his father’s burial place of Kilwinning. A Nevin gravestone at the abbey was still visible in the early 20th century.

Andrew Nevin, second laird, inherited in 1581 and married Janet, daughter of Adam Montgomery, IV laird of Broadstone. Their children were Thomas Nevin who succeeded, Ninian, Michael, Hugh of Gooseloan and Geilles, who married the Minister of Kilwinning.

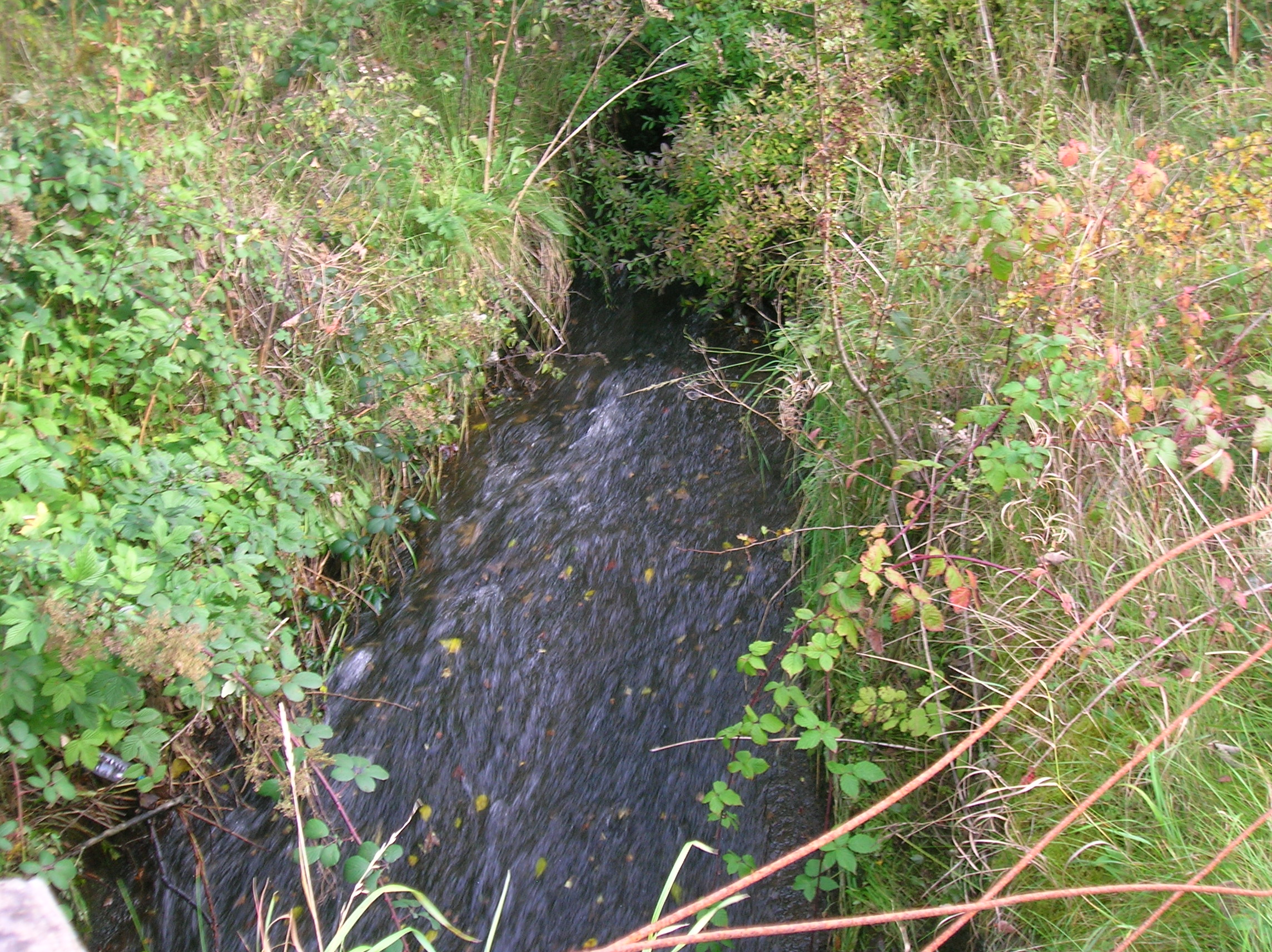
The Bannoch Burn at the old Goldcraigs Toll

Thomas Nevin, third laird, inherited in 1598 and with his Jean Shaw, daughter of John Shaw of Greenock, and had five children, viz Thomas, who succeeded, James, Patrick, Hugh and Elizabeth. Thomas Nevin, fourth laird, married Margaret Blair daughter of James Blair, Burgess of Ayr and had two offspring: Thomas, who succeeded, and John. Thomas Nevin, fifth laird, married Helen, daughter of Archibald Edmonston of Dutreath. The couple had two sons, Thomas, who inherited and William. Thomas Nevin, sixth laird, died without children; in 1680 he had inherited the lands of Gooslone, Gaitmuirland, Bannoch, Eister and Wester Monkridding, and Corshill, together with the manor place of Monkridding, with houses, coals, coalheugh, etc. and the land of Hallerhill of Lyleston, with houses and the land of old extent of Colcraig, with houses.

William, seventh and last Nevin laird, inherited from his brother, Monkredding and its estate with the teinds parsonage and vicarage, all lying in the parish and regality of Kilwinning, bailliary of Cunningham and shire of Ayr, from his brother in 1693. In 1698 William Nevin alienated the lands of Monkredding to Hugh Cunninghame of Clonbeith. It is not known where William went, however the family did have fairly extensive lands in Northern Ireland.

In 1585 Andrew Nevin took an action in the bailie court to evict John Rigg father and John Rigg son from the lands of Bannoch, and Matthew and Michael Lyn from Gaitmureland. Nevin was able to produce the legal documents that proved their control of these properties, originally obtained from last abbot. The tenants were evicted forthwith, taking their families and possessions with them.

==== The Tam o'Shanter connection ====
Towards the end of the 17th century, several Niven brothers from Monkridding and Brigend areas of Kilwinning parish moved to the Girvan area. John Niven set up as a blacksmith and was well known for designing and building a cart, with wheels that rotated on a fixed axle, at a time when most farmers still used sleds.

"Ae market-day thou was nae sober;
That ilka melder, wi' the miller,
Thou sat as lang as thou had siller;.
That every naig was ca'd a shoe on,
The smith and thee gat roaring fou on; "

It is thought that John is the smith mentioned in Robert Burns's poem 'Tam o'Shanter' and his son Robert may have been the miller in the classic poem.

=== The Cuninghames ===
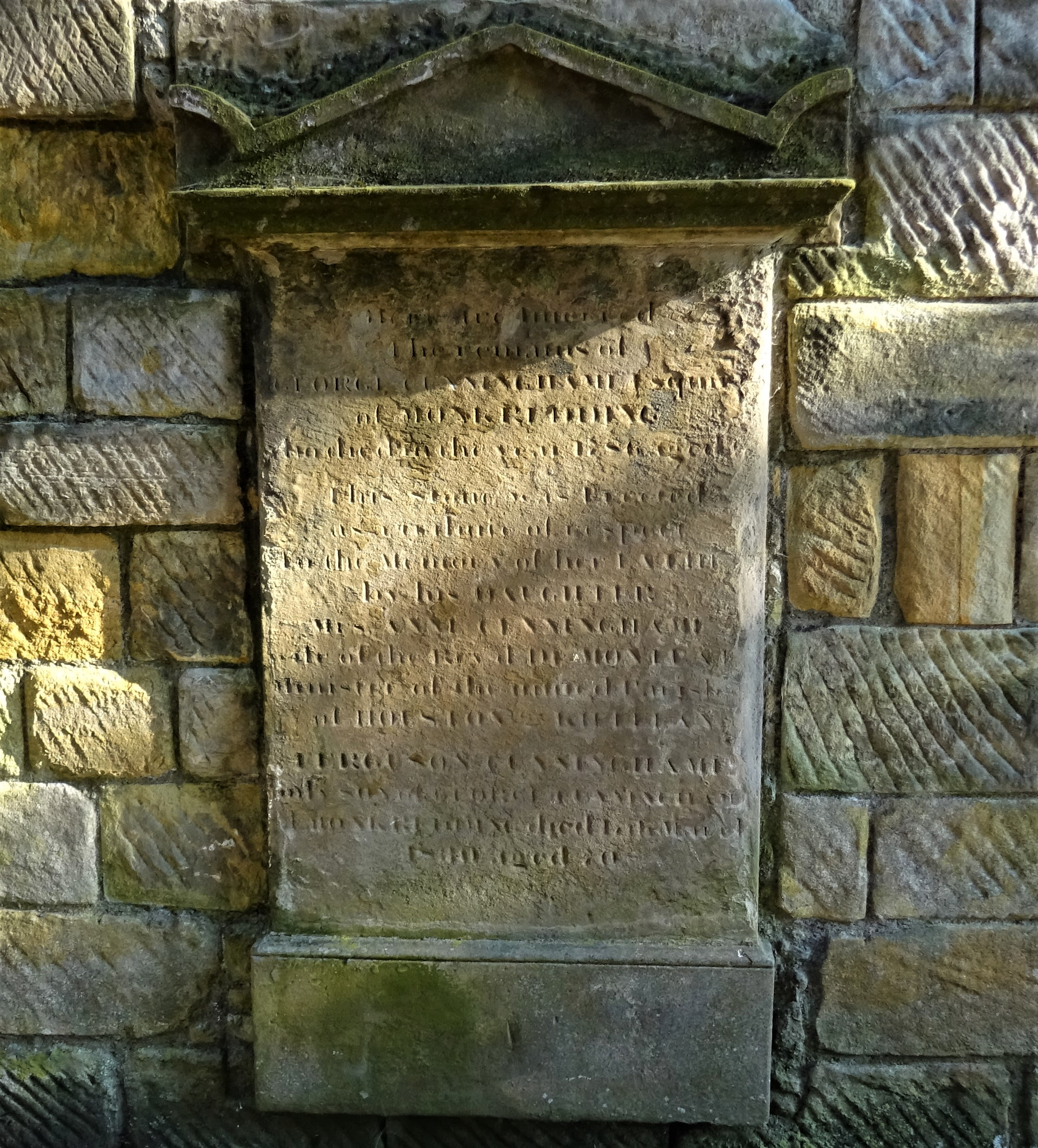
Memorial to the Cunninghames of Monkredding at the Kilwinning Old Parish church

As stated, in 1698 the Monkredding estate was sold to Hugh Cuninghame of Clonbeith, Writer to the Signet, who was succeeded by his son, George of Monkredding. George Cuninghame married Agnes, daughter of George Dallas of Parklie in 1714; she was a representative of an ancient and respectable family in Linlithgowshire. The couple had a son and three daughters. George, his heir, married Janet, daughter of John Gemmel of Towerlands in 1752, and had a son and four daughters. The eldest daughter, Agnes, married William Miller of Monkcastle. The second daughter, Catherine, married Thomas Brisbane, Minister of Dunlop, East Ayrshire 28 September 1785 and they had a son, Thomas Brisbane, M.D. Anne married John Monteath, Minister of Houston. Elizabeth married a Mr Harrison of the Excise office, Edinburgh and had no children.

Ferguson Cuninghame, succeeded his father in 1786, and being unmarried, at his death in 1830, the estate was divided in three shares among the heirs of his sisters, the eldest, Agnes, inheriting the family seat.

The Cuninghame family branches of Monkredding and Caddel used this variation of the spelling of their patronym.

=== The Millers ===
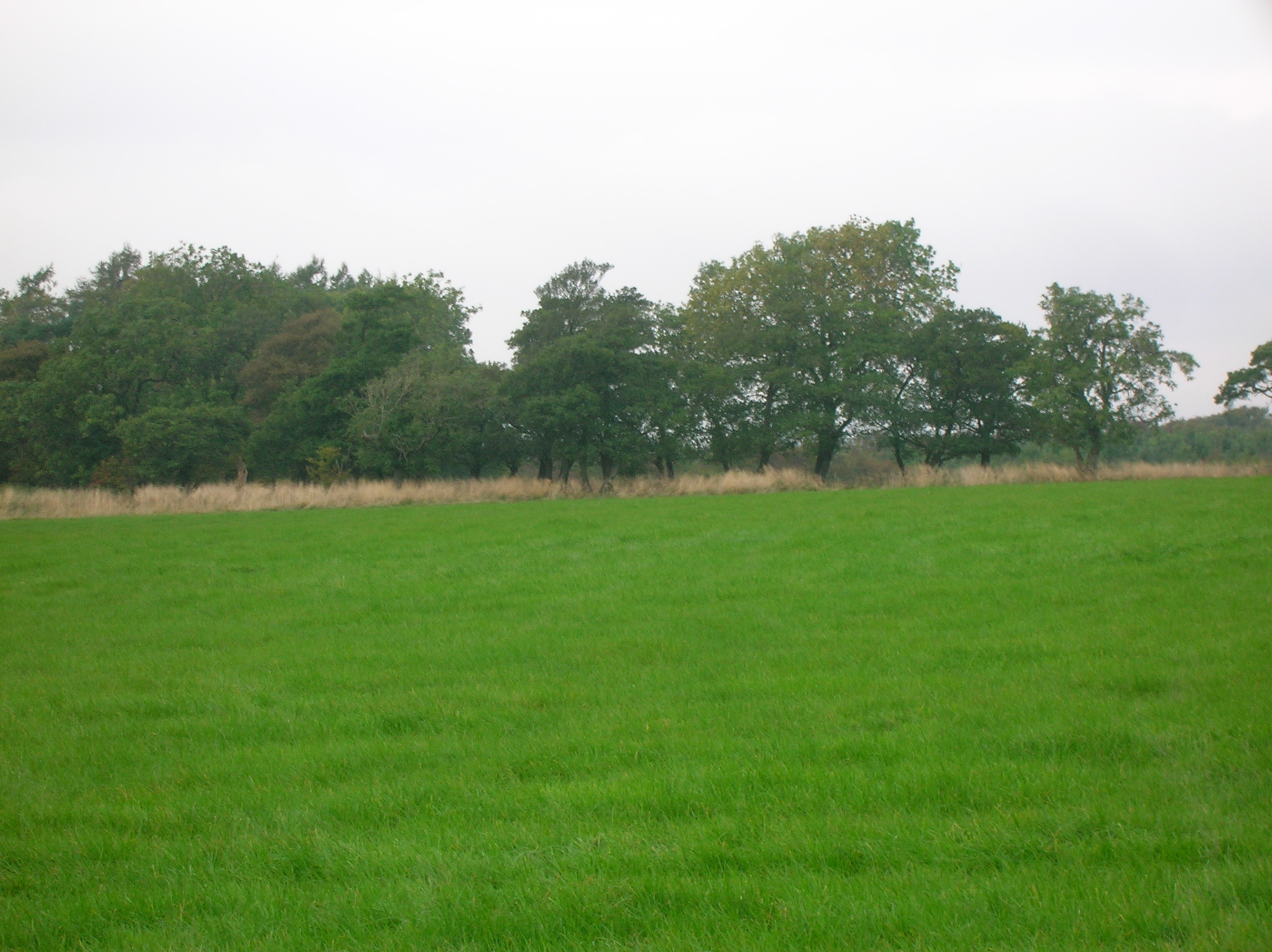
The site of the old High Monkredding Farm, previously named Goukhall Farm

As stated, William Miller of Monkcastle near Dalry, had married Agnes Cuninghame, daughter of George Cuninghame of Monkredding in 1773. Agnes inherited one-third of the estate of Monkredding upon the death of her unmarried brother, Ferguson Cuninghame. William Miller died in 1802; he was succeeded by his only child, William Alexander Miller (known as Alexander). Alexander Miller married a daughter of Patrick Warner of Ardeer, and had nine children. Alexander died in 1828, and was succeeded by his eldest son, William.

William Miller, born in 1801, was a member of the Faculty of Advocates, a Commissioner of Supply in Ayr, as well as provincial grand master of the Freemasons in Ayr. He married Anna Maria Campbell in 1830 and had three sons and two daughters. The two older sons died young, and upon the death of William Miller in 1846, the estate passed to his youngest son, William Campbell Miller. William Campbell Miller died intestate at the age of fifteen in 1857. His town residence had been Saxe Coburg Hall, Edinburgh.

The mansion house of Monkredding, with the gardens and about 6 acres (24,000 m^{2}) (two fields), and an equal share of the estate, passed, as stated, to Agnes Miller as the eldest. In 1802 her son William Alexander inherited, married the second daughter of Patrick Warner of Ardeer and had a son William, who inherited in 1828. William married Anna Maria, second daughter of Admiral Campbell of the Portuguese Navy. William Campbell Miller died unmarried in 1857 and his sisters inherited.

Eliza Maria Louisa had married Thomas Miller Walnut of the 74th Highlanders and Alexandrina Georgina Campbell had married Keith McAlister of Glen-bar, Argyllshire. Lyleston was the portion of the second sister; Mrs. Brisbane and Mrs. Monteath’s portion, was Goldcraig.

=== The MacAlisters ===
Keith MacAlister of Glen-bar, Argyleshire, inherited Monkredding through his wife, Alexandrina Georgiana Cuninghame MacAlister, who died in the spring of 1924; Alexandrina's two latter names were from her great great grandfather, George Cuninghame.

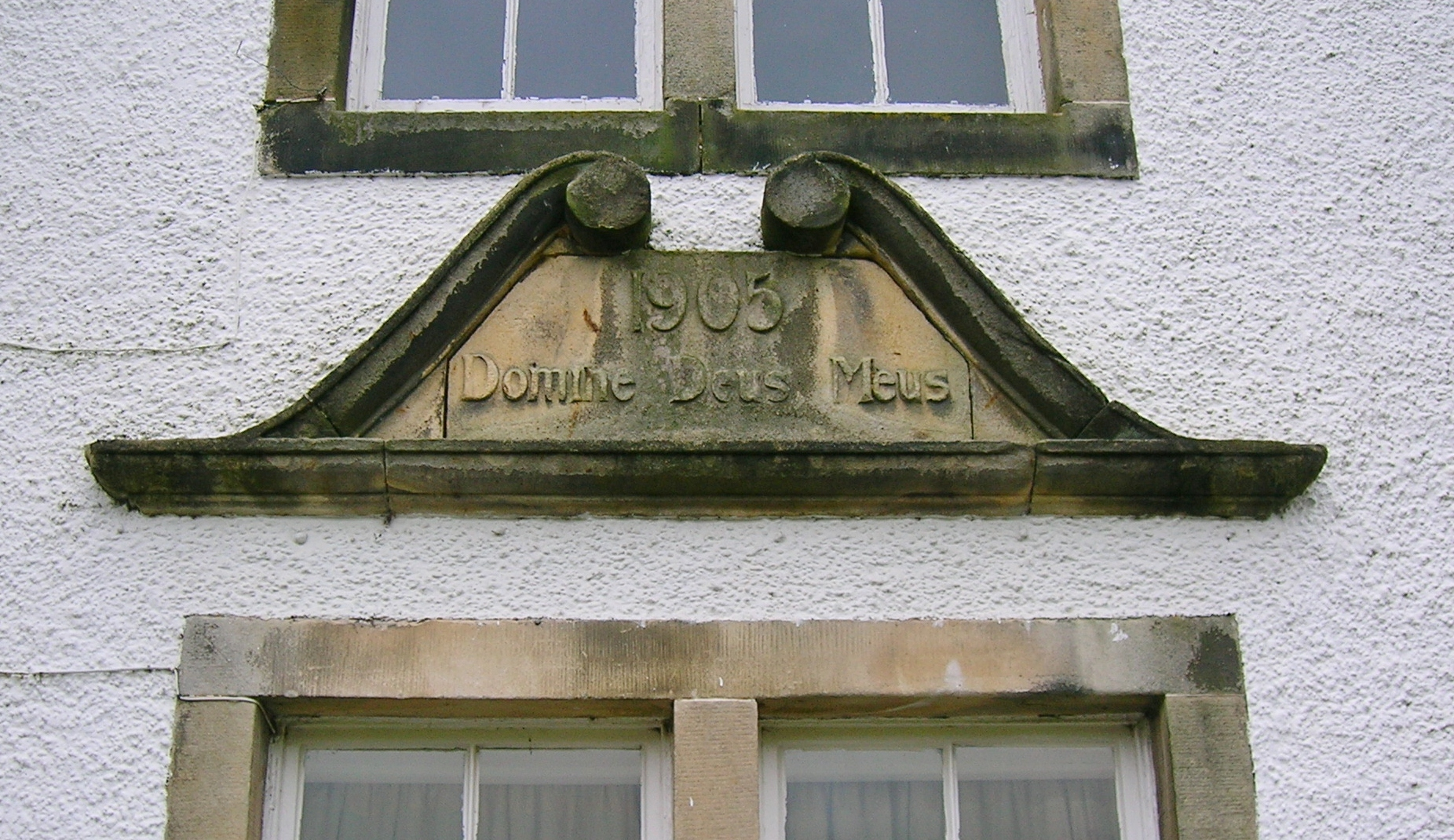
Stone recording the 1905 extension. The Latin translates as 'The Lord my God'.

The mansion house and estate of Monkredding passed to their son, Captain MacAlister R.N. retired. Captain MacAlister had contracted Yellow Fever in Jamaica and his heart was much damaged by it. It is recorded that his wife carefully nursed him; the couple had no offspring. The estate at this time consisted of four farms, viz Hullerhill, Crofthead, Bannoch, and Gooseloan, a freestone Quarry, and about 18 acres (73,000 m^{2}) of Woodlands.

=== Tenants ===
John Smith, the archaeologist, geologist, natural and local historian lived at Monkredding for a time in the late 19th century and wrote several of his books there, including 'Prehistoric Man In Ayrshire', published in 1895. He lived at the 'Golconda' lodge rather than at the house itself; the mansion house is recorded as being a ruin at the time.

Colonel B M Knox was living at the house as the tenant in 1956.

In the 1818 census, Jane Dickie, Retired Brick & Tile Manufacturer, and daughters Eliza and Jessie Dickie, were living at Monkredding House. The census also records that George Speirs, born Irvine and baptised Dreghorn, died 28 November 1858 at Monkredding House.

== The second Earl of Eglinton ==
Thomas Nevin of Monkredding seems to have been a good friend of Hugh, second Earl of Eglinton, who whilst visiting him, was taken seriously ill, and died in the house on 3 September 1546, even though Eglinton Castle was only a mile and a half away. In his will he appointed Thomas Nevin as one of the tutors or guardians to his son, Hugh, the third Earl of Eglinton. Monkredding is also given as the place in 1545 where Lord Eglinton's will had been written and witnessed.

== Mineral workings ==
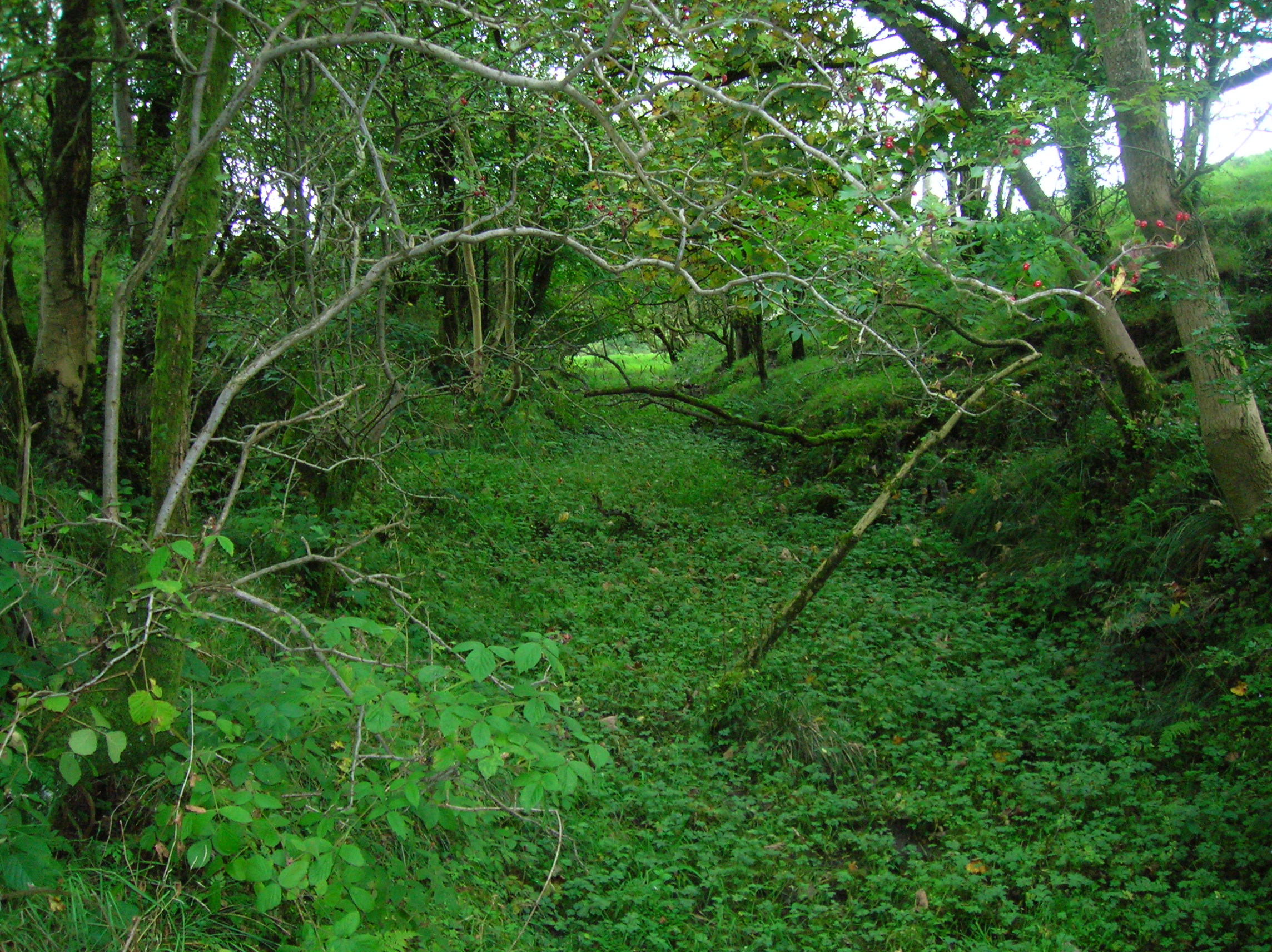
The old route from Lylestone to High Monkredding and its limestone quarries

Coal workings and wastes at Monkridding near Kilwinning were recorded by Timothy Pont in 1608, extending between 50 acres (200,000 m^{2}) and 100 acres (400,000 m^{2}), associated with the limestone. As stated, stone and coal workings came so close to the mansion house that the main entrance had to be moved.

In the lands of Monkridding there are old coal wastes, connected with the limestone series, from 2 1/2 to 3 feet in thickness, which had been opened several hundred years ago and they extend over between 50 and 100 acres. This coal-bed must have been of great value in those days of defective machinery from the peculiar position of the coal and lay of the land, as it was all wrought water-free and from the old waste there is now a constant run of fine water. There is a great extent of the lower seam yet to work. Among the Blair papers were found receipts for coal from this locality dated 200 years ago.

Monkredding Quarry, with its associated smithy and railway, was a freestone quarry with associated hamlet, limestone and coal pits; as shown on the OS 6-inch (150 mm) to the mile map. The Inspector of Mines' Report in 1874 lists Monkredding amongst the twelve operating mines in the Irvine area.

The Monkridden No.1 coal seam was abandoned before 1879 and No.2, Wee coal and limestone was still working in 1877. Goldcraig's limestone quarry closed in 1891 and the Wee coal working was abandoned in 1927. Lylestone had Wee coal and fire-clay workings. The upper quarries were abandoned in 1918.

=== Lylestone Row ===
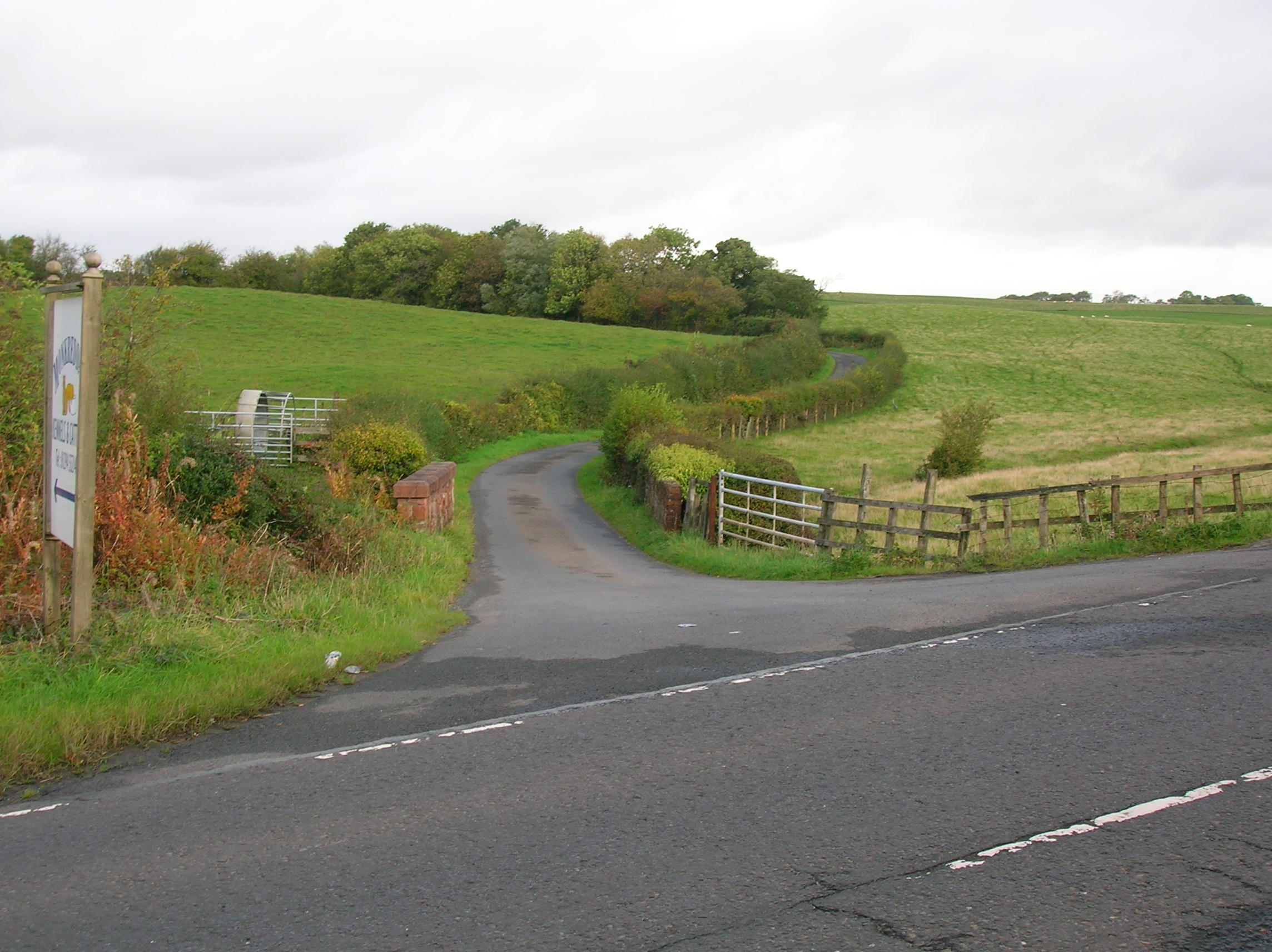
The ancient Kilwinning to Beith road near Goldcraigs

The ruins of Lylestone Row stand on the roadside near Monkredding House, opposite to the old Monkredding Quarry and close to the old Seven Acres (Snacres) Quarry. In the 19th century the row contained six dwellings and was home to workers from the nearby extensive freestone and limestone quarries and coal pits. A smithy once stood opposite the row and a mineral railway ran up to the site, running through the woods, parallel to the main road from the old Kilmarnock to Dalry mainline railway. A railway or tramway also ran up to a limestone quarry near to High Monkredding. The Lylestone school buildings still stand at Lylestone, converted into a private dwelling.

Lord Lyle was a local landowner, connected with the Montgomeries of Eglinton by marriage; Lord Nicholas Montgomerie, had married the daughter and only heir of Lord Lyle about 1500. Closure of the quarries led to the decline and abandonment of this once thriving local community in the late 20th century. Monkredding Quarry at NS329452 is a Provisional Local Nature Conservation Site as designated by the Scottish Wildlife Trust in co-operation with North Ayrshire Council.

== Microhistory ==
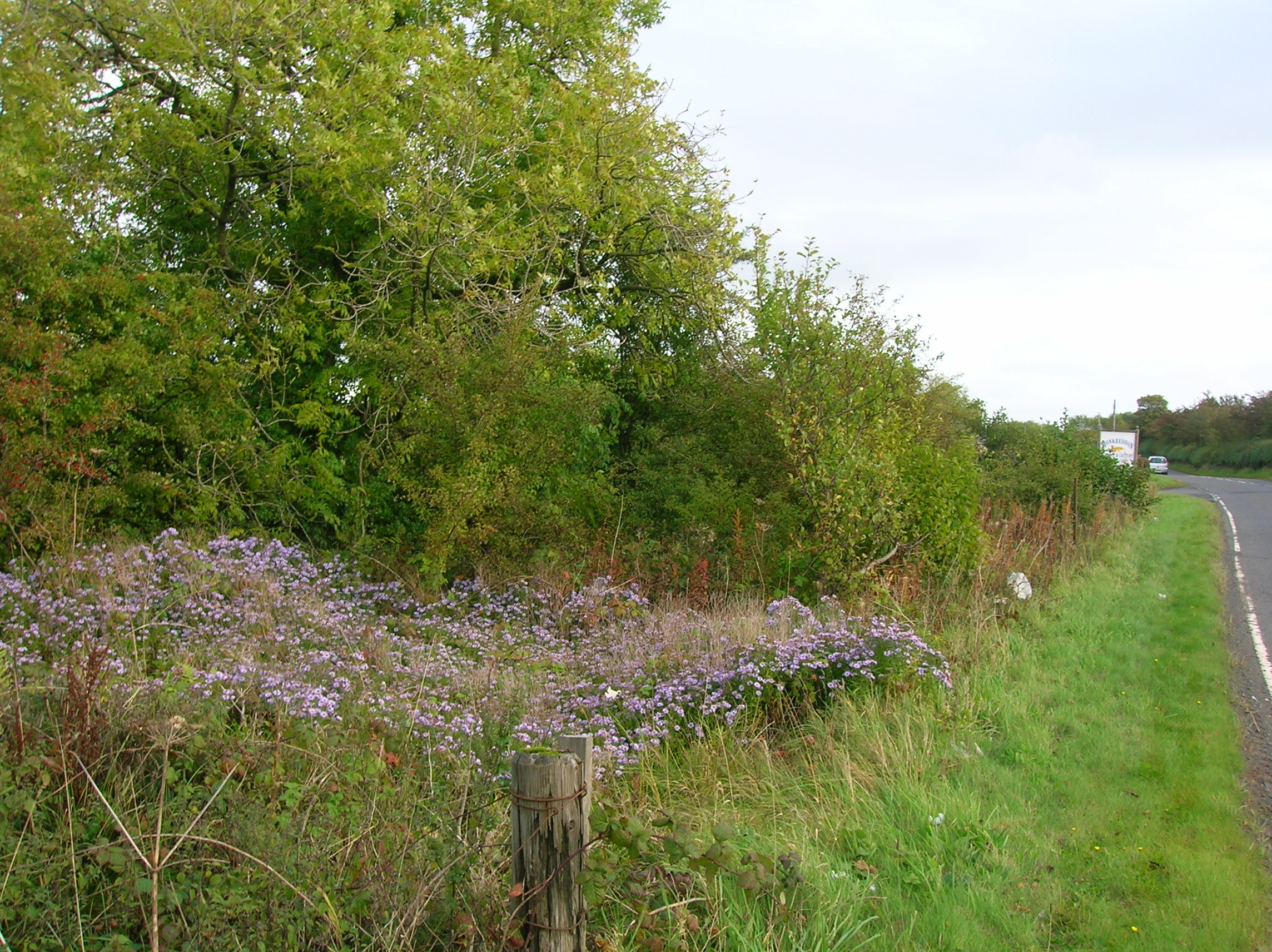
Site of the old Goldcraigs Toll House

A Ley tunnel is said to have run from Monkredding House to Kilwinning Abbey.

Goldcraig farm has been demolished and the site is now a North Ayrshire Council roads depot. A Toll gate at Goldcraig is shown on the 1897 OS map.

The monks of Kilwinning Abbey held the rights to obtain stone from the Goldcraig Quarry to repair the abbey and by extrapolation the abbey may have been largely built from stone taken from here.

In 1605 the Nevins held lands from Sir Hugh Montgomery within his estates in the parish of Donaghadee in Northern Ireland. Hugh Nevin was appointed by royal presentation, 1 December 1634, to the Vicarage of Donaghadee and Ballywalter. Rev. Thomas Nevin, M.A., was Minister of Downpatrick, ordained 20 Nov 1711. He died 1744 having married his cousin, Margaret Boyd, oldest daughter of Thomas Boyd of Glastry.

== See also ==
- Kirkwood Estate, East Ayrshire
- Eglinton Castle
- Towerlands, North Ayrshire
