= Monkcastle, North Ayrshire =

Monkcastle
- Dalry, North Ayrshire, Scotland; UK grid reference NS4084831699
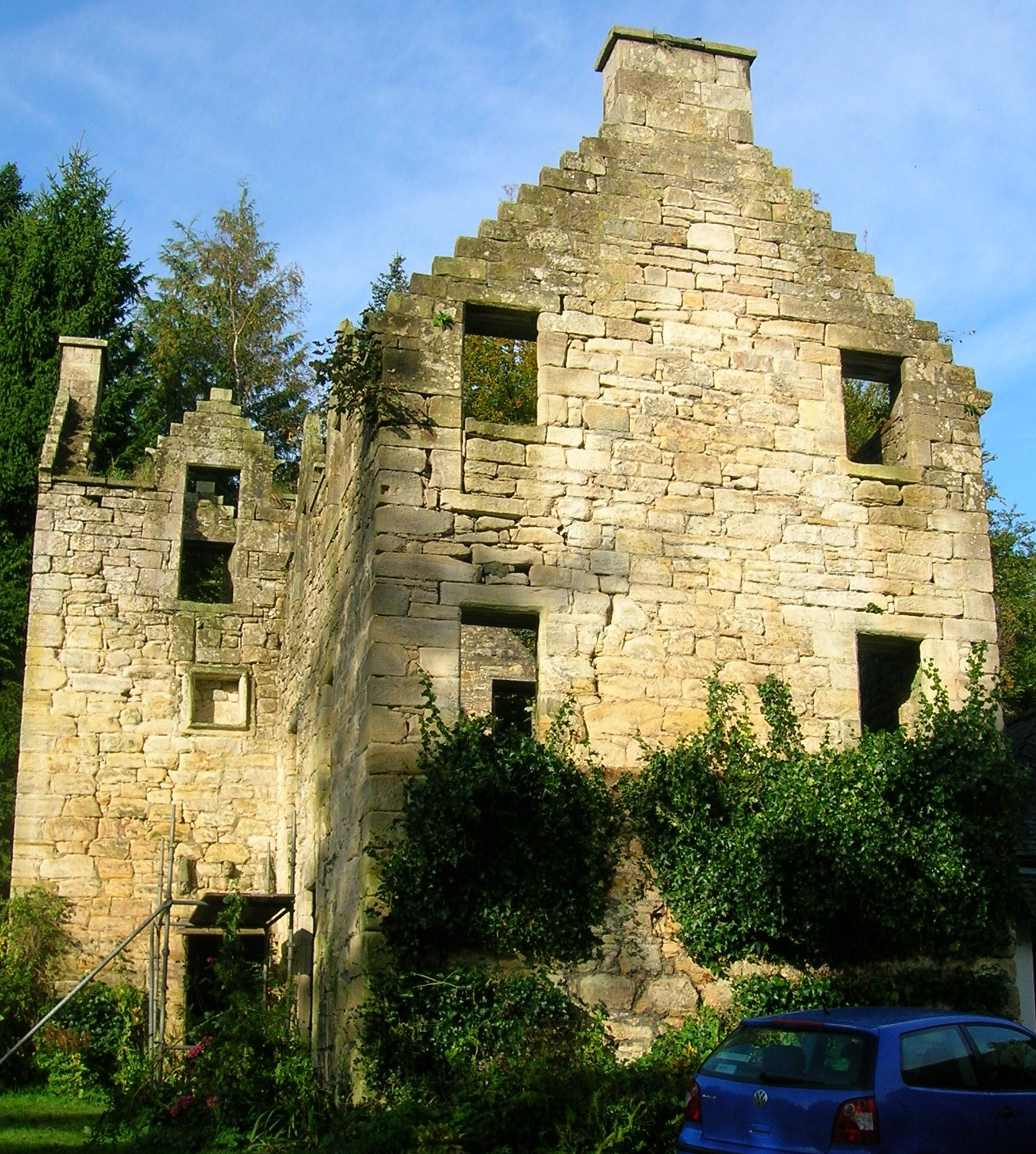
- Monkcastle frontage

Site information
- Owner: Major John Coleman
- Controlled by: Hamilton clan
- Open to the public: No
- Condition: A consolidated ruin

Location
- Coordinates: 55.6833°N 4.7158°W
- Grid reference: grid reference NS291473

Site history
- Built: 16th century
- Built by: Unknown
- In use: Until 18th century
- Materials: Freestone

Monkcastle or Monk Castle, sometimes known as Old Monkcastle, formed a small estate in the Parish of Kilwinning, North Ayrshire, Scotland, lying between Kilwinning and Dalry on the A737. The property was originally held by the Tironensian monks of Kilwinning Abbey and was probably the site of the abbot's country retreat. The 17th-century Monkcastle is a category B listed ruin, although it has been consolidated and stands next to a private house, constructed from the converted old home farm buildings. The 19th-century mansion of Monkcastle House is nearby, and is also category B listed. The castle may have been used as a dower house or retreat.

== History ==
Timothy Pont, in about 1606, described Monkcastle as "a pretty fair building veill planted".

=== Abbots of Kilwinning ===
Kilwinning Abbey ruins in the 19th century

Monkcastle was the administrative centre for the north-west portion of the extensive estates held by the monks of Kilwinning Abbey. Rents were collected here, leases arranged, etc. It was associated with the monk's mill at Craigmill, Dalry.

The commendator, Alexander Hamilton, became the Duke of Chatelherault, and under this French title he obtained the tower of Monkland, later Monkcastle, from the last abbot, Gavin Hamilton. He also obtained Dalgarven, Auchenkist, and Birklands. Monkcastle was a "part of the ancient halydom of Kilwinning, which about this time was beginning to be parcelled out by the Abbots, to whoever would best remunerate them for the ostensible gift, foreseeing that their own possession was becoming doubtful and unsteady." Alexander passed the property to Claud, his third son, who became Commendator of Paisley, at the age of ten, duly ratified and approved by Pope Julius III in 1553; this may account for the mitred head which appears in a panel above the doorway, together with other sculptures, typical of early 17th-century castles and also found at sites such as Barholm, Ardblair, and Dundarave. Salter sees two of the carvings as being lizards with human heads and Close and Riches see them as "watchful dragons."

=== Monkcastle ===
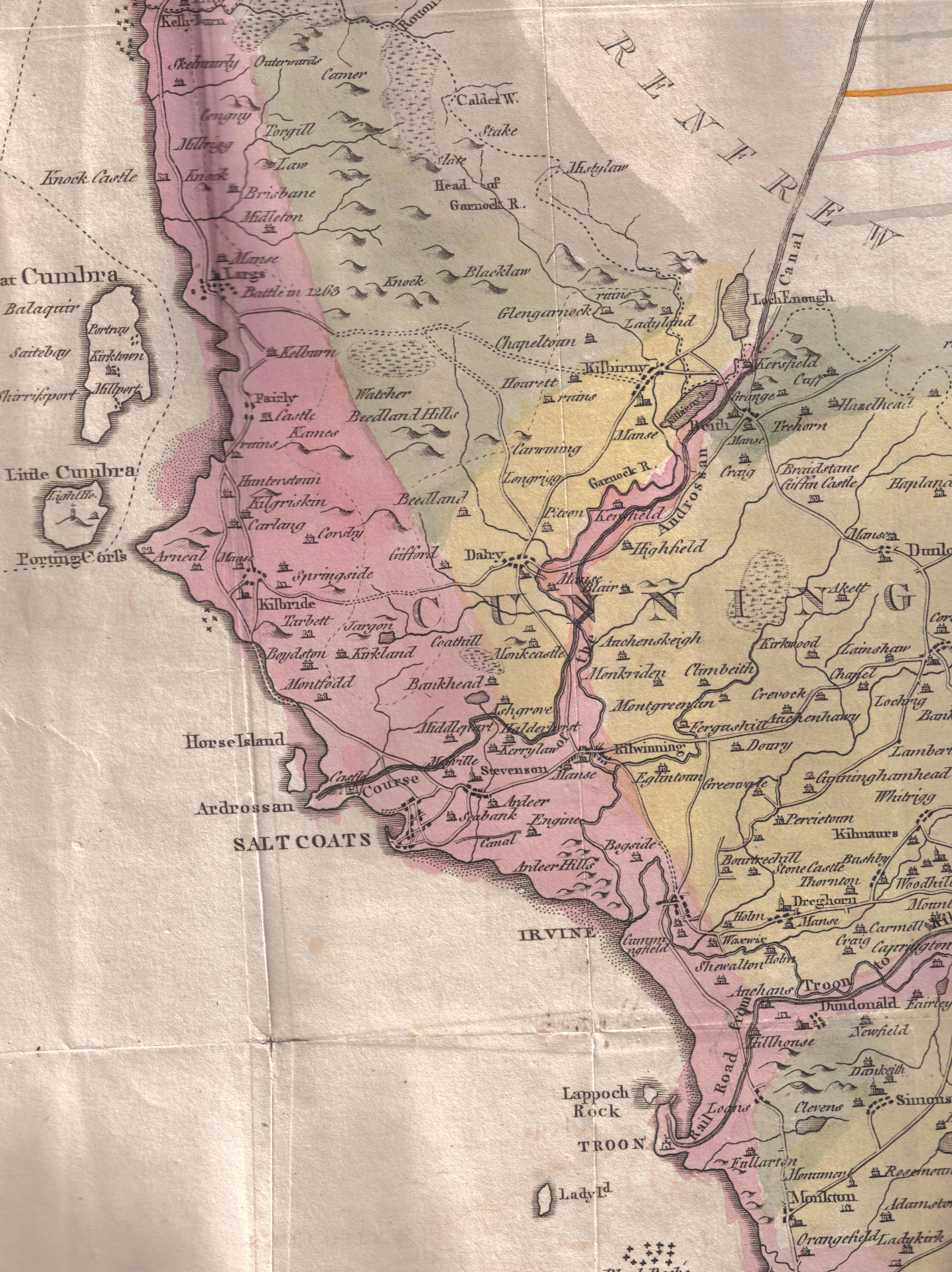
Monkcastle and Northern Ayrshire. The canal to Glasgow is shown, but this section was never built.

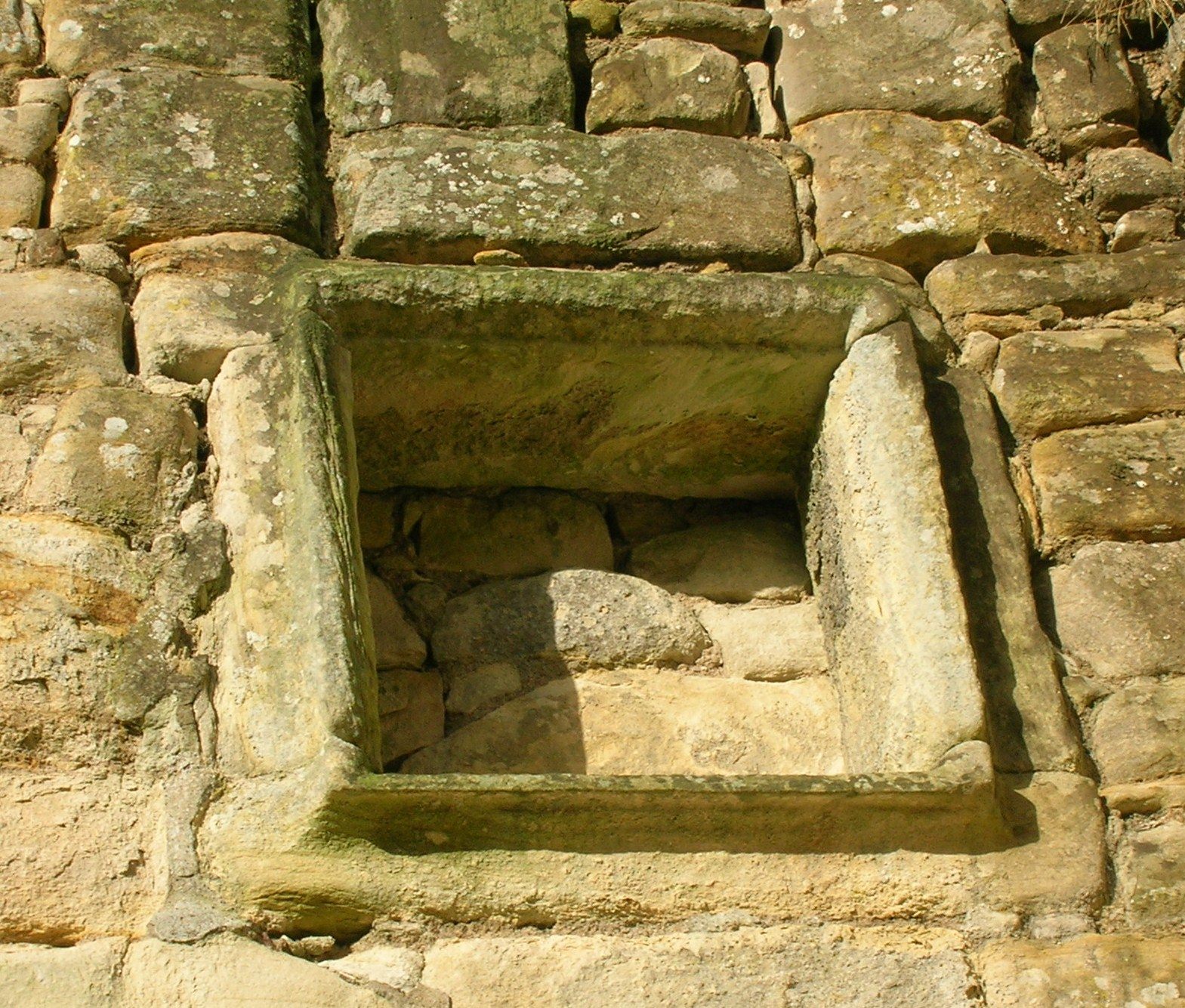
A blank armorial panel above the entrance

The ruins of Monkcastle are in woodland to the west of the A737 trunk road on the right bank of the River Garnock, 1 1/4 miles (2.0 km) south of Dalry and 2 1/2 miles (4.0 km) north of Kilwinning and represent a small, late 16th or early 17th century 'T-plan' laird's house which has replaced some of the earlier structures that stood on the site; a Monkcastle is recorded in 1536. The castle measures around 48 ft by 18 ft, standing two storeys high, with a central staircase tower projecting, and rising one storey higher. The entirely ruinous interior has extensive brickwork and concrete supports; the ground floor is vaulted. The entrance door is unusually wide and low, with carvings above. The building is domestic, rather than military in style, with corbie-stepped gables and stones laid in courses. In 1895 Smith records the castle ruins as having been recently restored, suggesting consolidation work. Hooks for window shutters survive at the first floor level. Crow stepped dormer heads were added in the 19th century and windows on the south elevation may have been enlarged at this time. The building's rear wall has been greatly altered to give access to another building circa the 19th century.

Close and Riches see the layout to be a mirror image of Crosbie Tower that may have been inspired by Monkcastle.

The Rev. William Lee Kerr in 1900 described the castle as ruinous and made reference to cellars "which can still be traced underground." No such cellars are visible today (2011).

Doocot and sundial

Nearby the ruins there are said to be the jumbled remains of an ancient dovecot, in appearance more like an ice house. The OS map shows a formal garden to the south of the castle ruins. Rob Close sees similarities with Crosbie Castle, Prestwick.

A facet-head sundial of the 17th or 18th century is recorded to have existed at 'Monk Castle', but listed as lost in 1987.

==== Monkcastle House ====
Alexander-William Miller built the surviving Monkcastle House nearby, circa 1820, probably designed by the architect David Hamilton and similar in architectural style to Swindridgemuir. John Campbell Arbuthnott, 16th Viscount of Arbuthnott married in 1949 Kathleen Maude Eginton Grant, only child and heiress of Charles Edward Grant of Monkcastle. Monkcastle House is in 2010 the private dwelling of Sir Charles Stuart-Menteth, 7th Baronet of Closeburn and Mansefield.

=== The estate ===
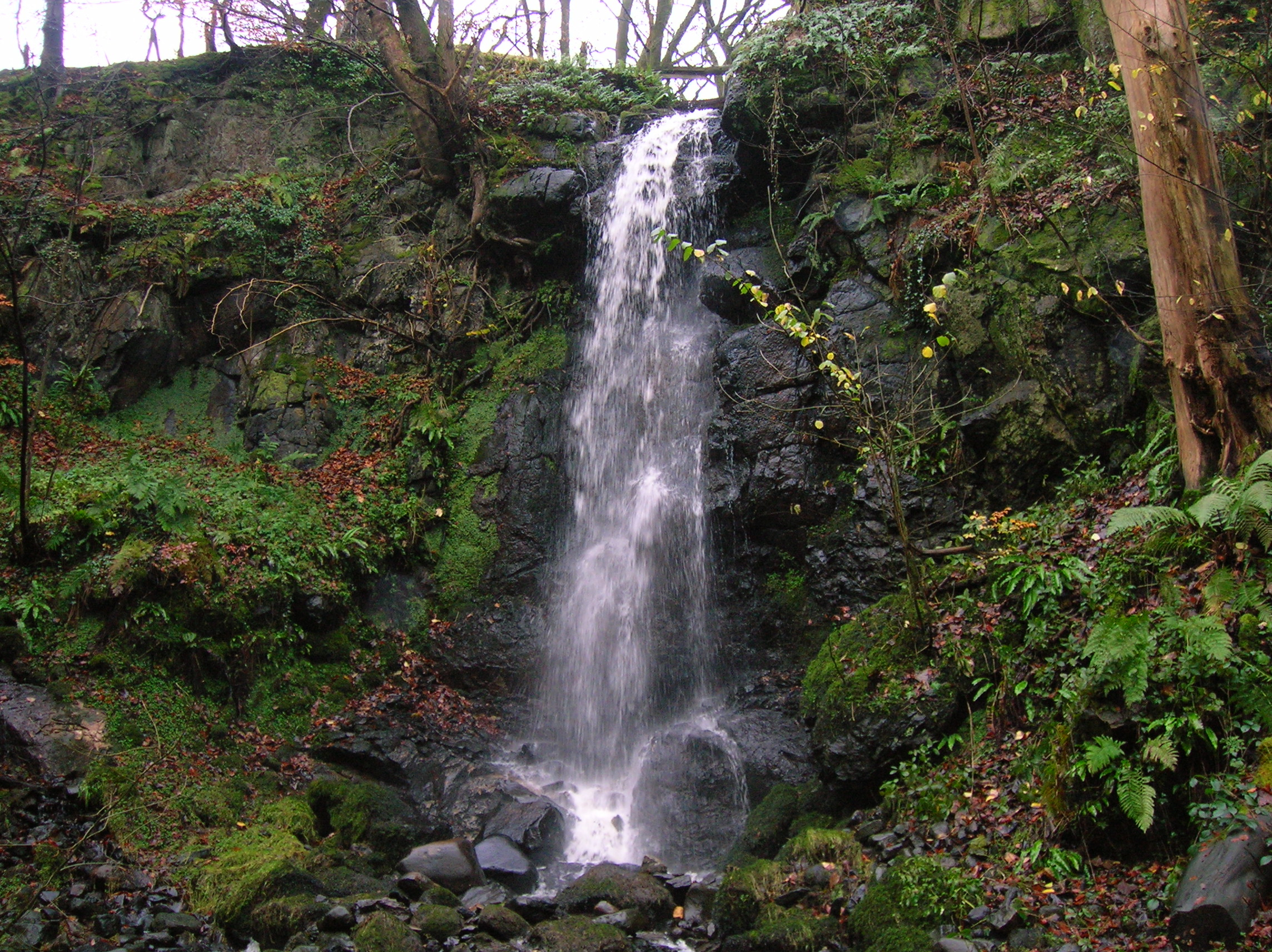
Monkcastle Spout at the top of the glen

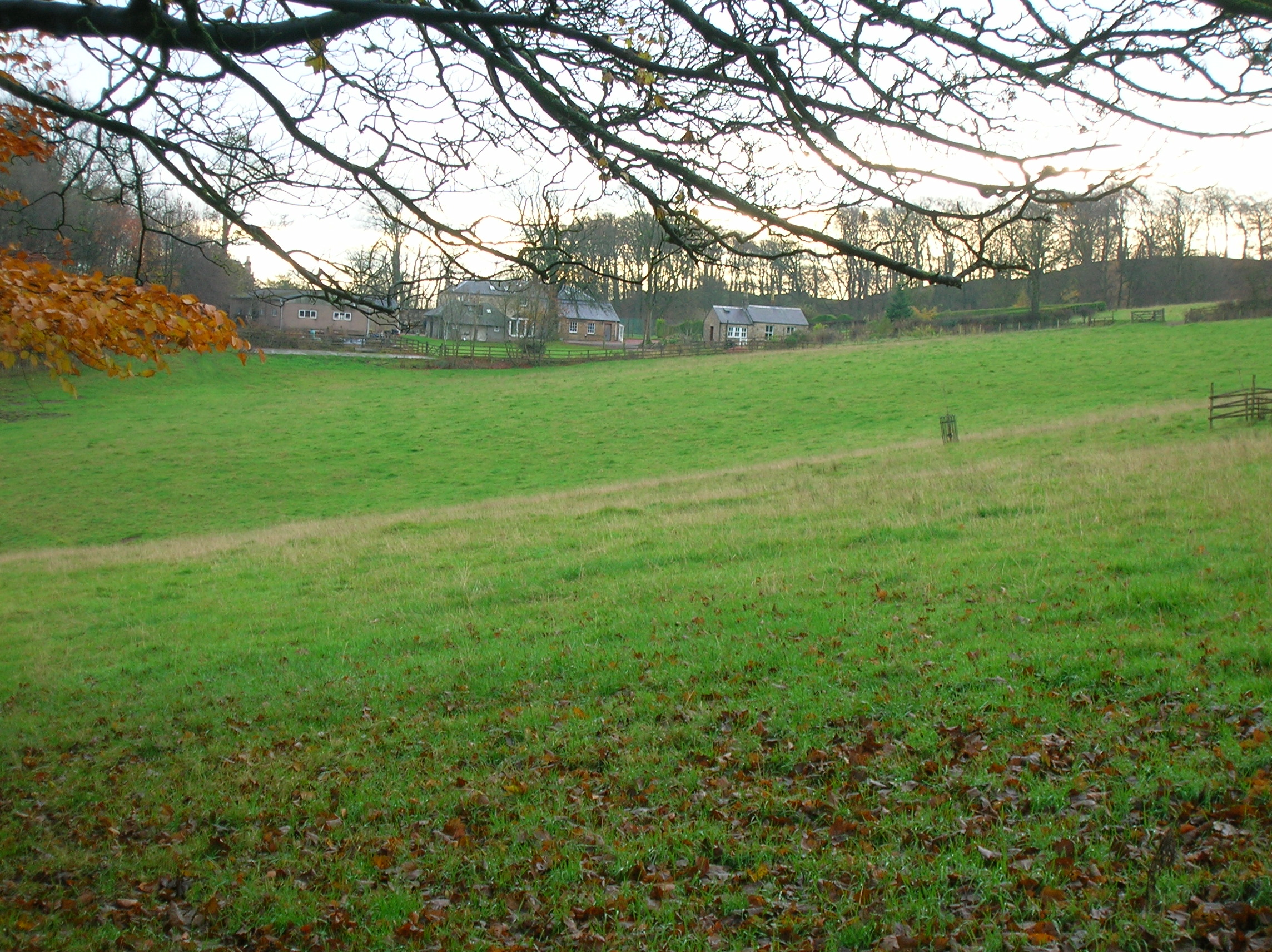
Monkcastle House from Old Monkcastle

In 1866 the estate amounted to around 360 acres. William Campbell Miller died intestate at the age of fifteen in 1857. At the time of his death his town residence was Saxe Coburg Hall, Edinburgh, and the following properties were listed in the inventory of his estate: Baidlandhill and Windyedge in the parish of Dalry; Hill of Fergushill, Kilwinning parish; Craighead, and Craighead Mill; High Monkcastle and Low Monkcastle; Hillend; Mansion House Grange; Cottages at Old House; Crofthead; Heatterhill; Bannock; and Monkridding House.

Under the ownership of the Grant family the farms were progressively sold off until only the core of the estate remained.

An old lane, probably built by the monks for their tenants, ran from the monk's mill at Craigmill in Lynn Glen via Craighead and then down to Monkcastle via High Monkcastle, joining the road to Kilwinning Abbey itself.

In 1691 the Hearth Tax Rolls record the following people and hearths on the estate: Montcastell housse 6; Martha Docheon 1;James Miller, Bryheid 1; Robert Miller, Cragmylne (In margin "no payet") 1; Robert Boyll 1; Robert Gaven 1; George Logane 1; William Miller 1; John Wilsonne 1; John Stewart 2.

The "Black Man"'s path ran from Old Monkcastle to Monkcastle House, named after a servant of the Grant's of Monkcastle House, Antonio Escazio, who walked this route regularly. It is not known which country this individual came from, but San Antonio de Escazu is a town in Costa Rica; he is buried in Kilwinning Cemetery.

An old cholera pit is located in the grounds of nearby Monkcastle House, dating from the 1830s.

Alexander-William Miller was an enthusiastic agricultural reformer and actively controlled the farming of most of the Monkcastle estate. He encouraged 'spade husbandry' and regularly achieved a crop of sixty to seventy bushels per acre, whilst with the plough only thirty was generally produced.

== The Monkcastle lairds ==
=== The Hamiltons ===
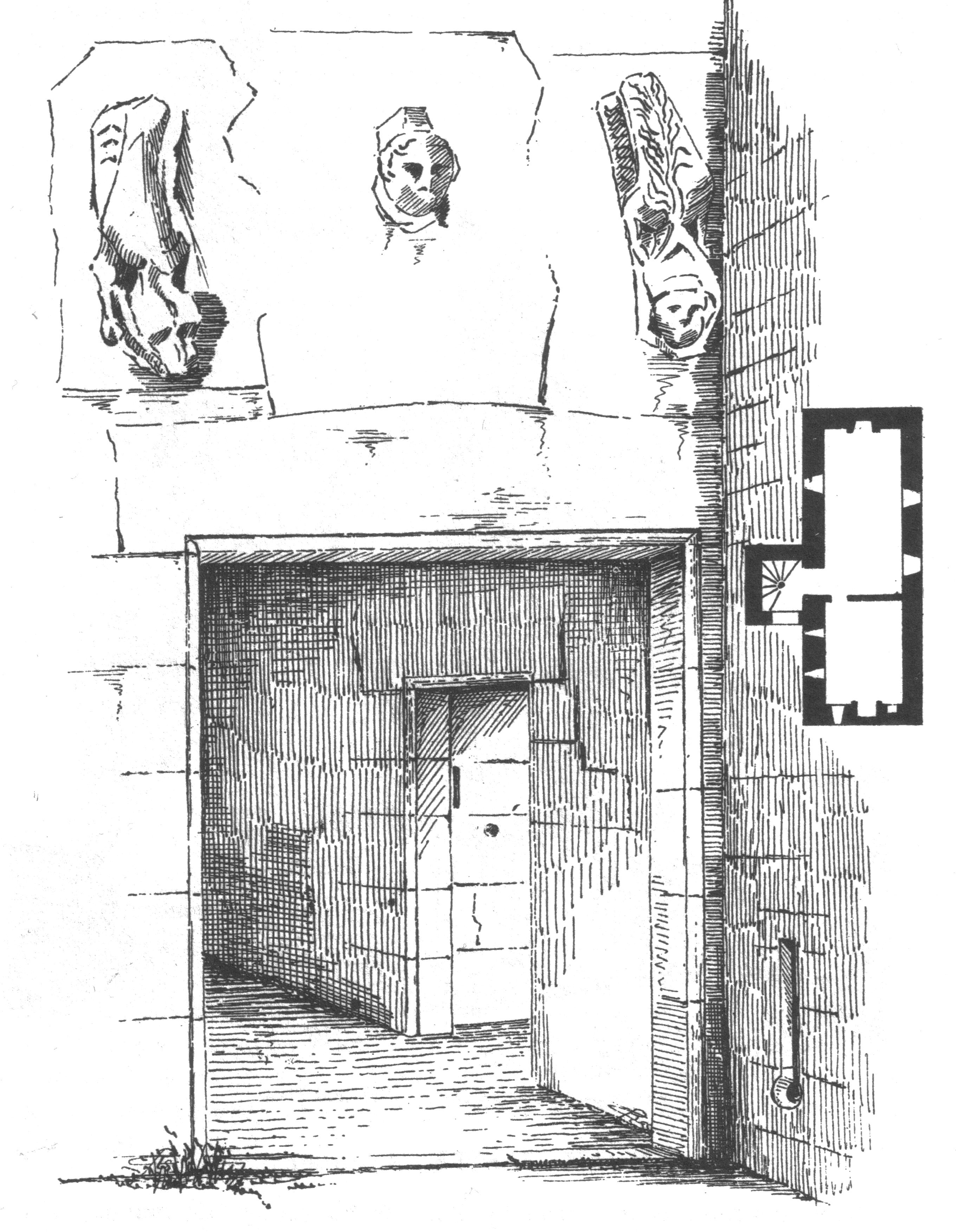
The entrance to Monkcastle with carvings (ground plan to right)

Lord Claud Hamilton, third son of Alexander, was created Lord Paisley on 20 July 1552. He was a great adherent to the cause of Queen Mary and after the Battle of Langside his lands were confiscated and passed to Lord Semple who "exercised all around a severe military discipline, displaying every violence and oppression on that power can do, to maintain a precarious position." By 1573 the lands had been returned to Lord Claud Hamilton.

Claud's son, James, was created Earl of Abercorn, Baron of Paisley, Hamilton, Mountcastle (sic), and Kilpatrick in 1604 or 1606; in the same year he was appointed as one of the commissioners to "treat of an union with England." In 1621, James, second earl, inherited the "8 merk lands of old extent of Monkcastle". In 1648, the lands of Upper and Lower Monkcastle and others passed to James, Duke of Hamilton. At this time (1661) Hugh, Earl of Eglinton, still claimed the lands as a right of superiority in his role of 'Lord of Erection' of Kilwinning Abbey. In 1673, Ann, Duchess of Hamilton, and Susanna, Countess of Cassilis, were heirs of these lands to their father, James, Duke of Hamilton.

=== Hay, Wallace, Cuninghame, Coleman, and others ===
The Earl of Abercorn sold the lands to George Hay, who then conveyed them to the Lairds of Dunlop and Pitcon. John Wallace, minister of Largs, obtained the Monkcastle lands and his son, George, sold them to an advocate, Adam Cuninghame. Adam's sister, Jean, sold the lands to Alexander Miller in 1723 with the permission of her husband, David Forrester of Denovan. The property in 2010 was owned by Major John Coleman.

=== The Millers ===
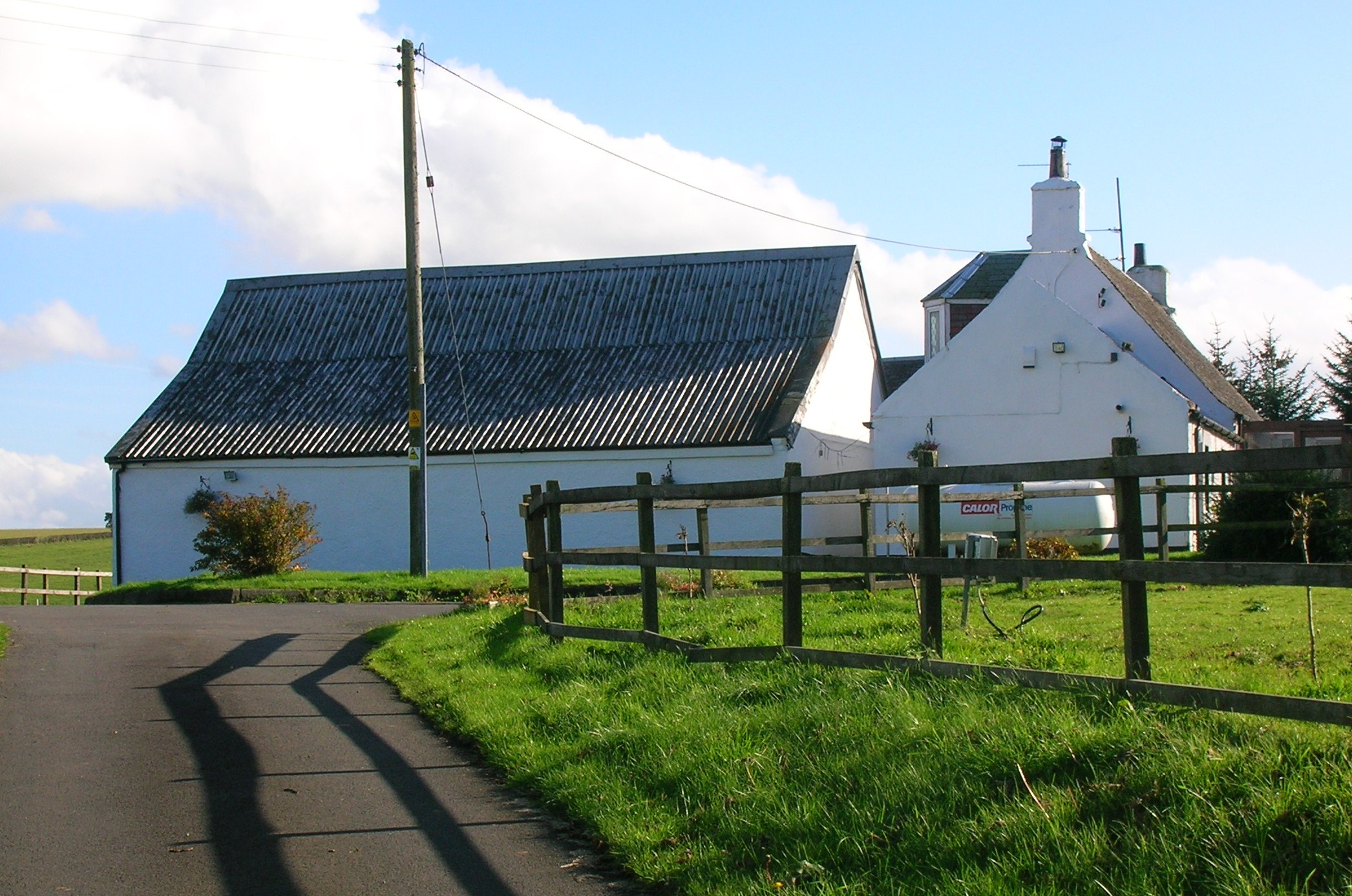
Craighead Farm, once part of the lands of Monkcastle

Alexander Miller obtained the lands of Monkcastle and Craigmill in 1723.

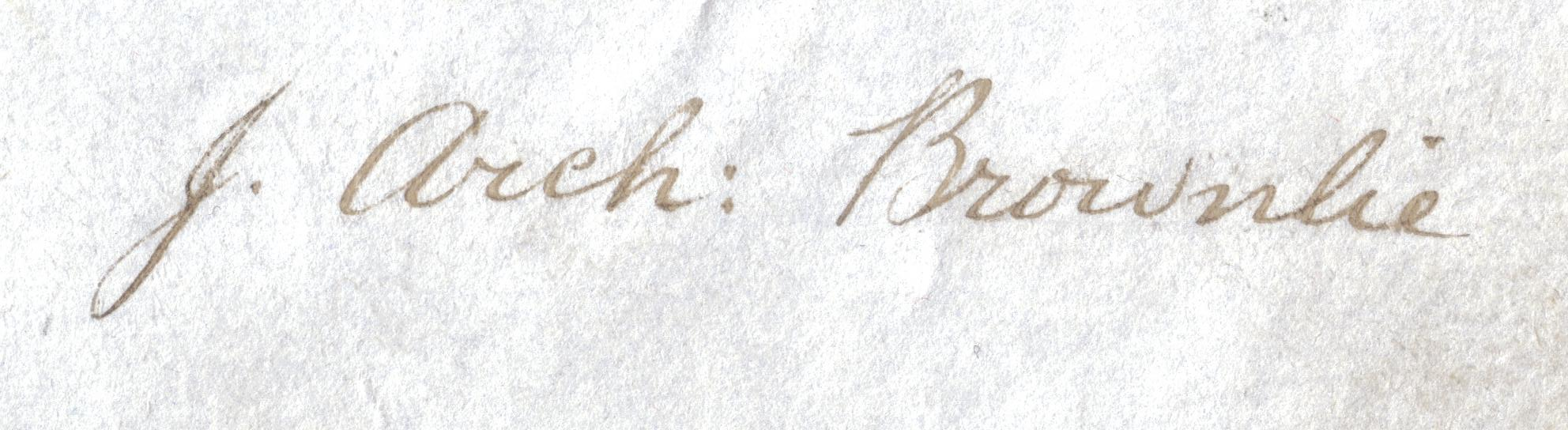
Signature of John Archibald Brownlie of Monkcastle. He purchased the Chapeltoun estate near Stewarton on 21 November 1888 from John Cunningham, Ironmaster, Barrhead.

Alexander Miller was a merchant and burgess of Glasgow, dying shortly after his purchase of the estate. His father was William Miller and had two sons, the other being William, also a merchant in Glasgow. The property passed to his elder brother, William Miller, who married Jean Nimmo of Bridgehouse in Linlithgow in 1727, acquiring through this marriage Netherhill House, in the parish of Torphichen. He died in 1757 at the age of 97, leaving two sons. The estate passed to the elder son, William, who in 1773 married Agnes Cunninghame, daughter of George Cuninghame of Monkredding. Agnes inherited one third of the estate of Monkredding when her brother, Fergusson Cuninghame, died without heir. On William’s death in 1802, he was succeeded by his only child, William Alexander Miller (known as Alexander). Alexander Miller married Warner, daughter of Patrick Warner of Ardeer, and had nine children. He died in 1828, and was succeeded by his eldest son, William.

William Miller died in 1802, he was succeeded by his only child, William Alexander Miller (known as Alexander). Alexander Miller married a daughter of Patrick Warner of Ardeer, and had nine children. Alexander died in 1828, and was succeeded by his eldest son, William.

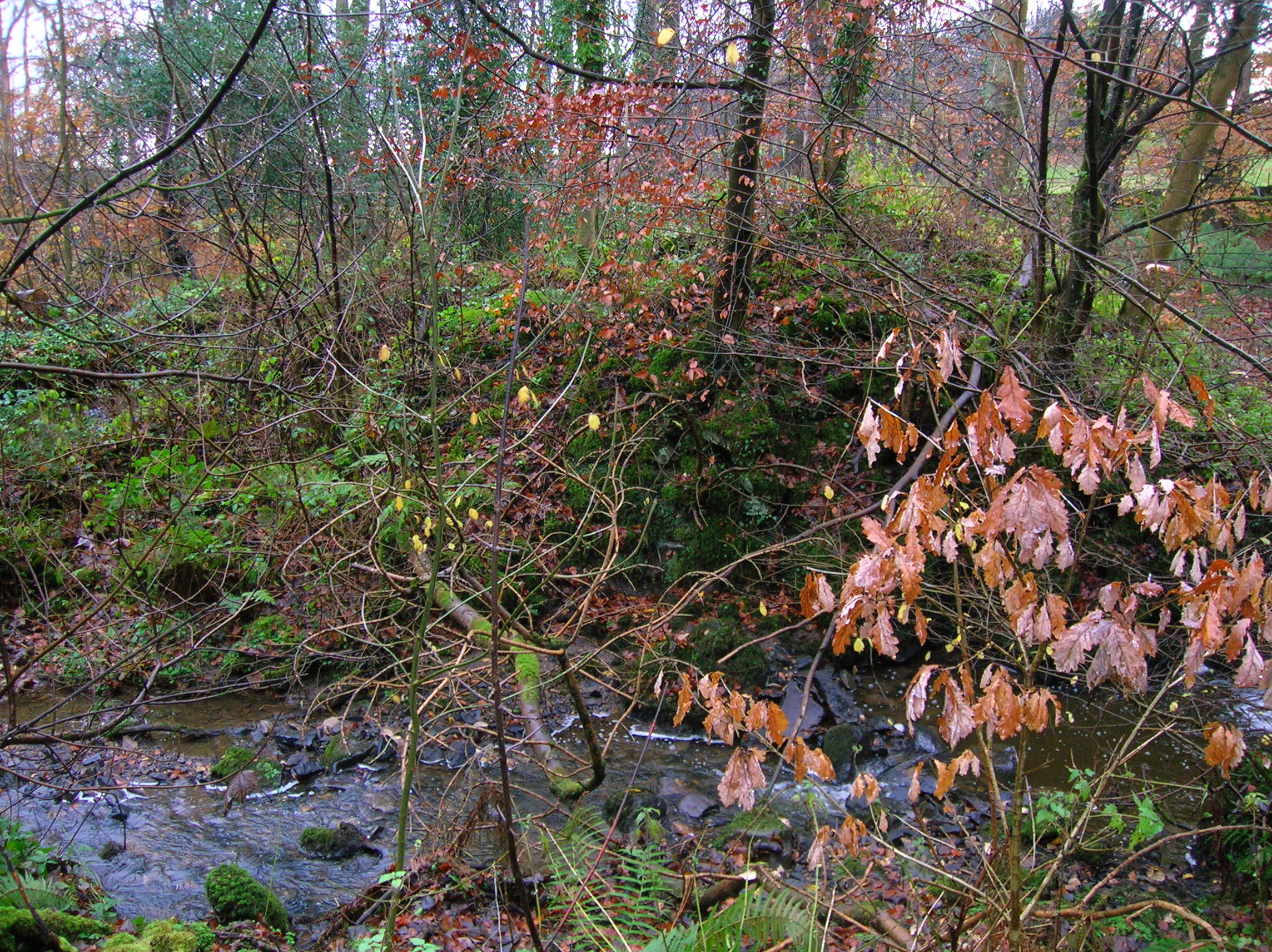
Remains of the old icehouse or doocot

William Miller, born in 1801, was a member of the Faculty of Advocates, a commissioner of supply in Ayr, as well as provincial grand master of the Freemasons in Ayr. He married Anna Maria Campbell in 1830 and had three sons and two daughters. The two older sons predeceased him, and upon the death of William Miller in 1846, the estate passed to his youngest son, William Campbell Miller. William died intestate at the age of fifteen in 1857 and the estates passed to his sisters. His town residence had been Saxe Coburg Hall, Edinburgh.

Monkredding, and an equal share of the combined estates, passed to Agnes Miller as the eldest sister. In 1802 her son William Alexander inherited, married the second daughter of Patrick Warner of Ardeer and had a son William, who inherited in 1828. William Alexander, who had lived at Monkcastle, married Anna Maria, second daughter of Admiral Campbell of the Portuguese Navy.

William Campbell Miller died unmarried in 1857 and his sisters inherited. Eliza Maria Louisa had married Thomas Miller Walnut of the 74th Highlanders and Alexandrina Georgina Campbell of Monkcastle had married Keith McAlister of Glen-bar, Argyllshire and lived at Monkredding.

The family motto was 'Forward' and the crest a lion erect, holding in his paws a cross meline of the second.

== Industry and transport ==
The monks established a network of tracks that linked their properties, one of which ran via Dalgarven Mill to Monkcastle and onto Craigmill via Craighead. Such tracks were necessary for many reasons, not least the obligation of thirlage, by which tenants had to take their corn to be ground at the mills held by the monks.

=== Minerals ===
==== Monkcastle fireclay mine ====
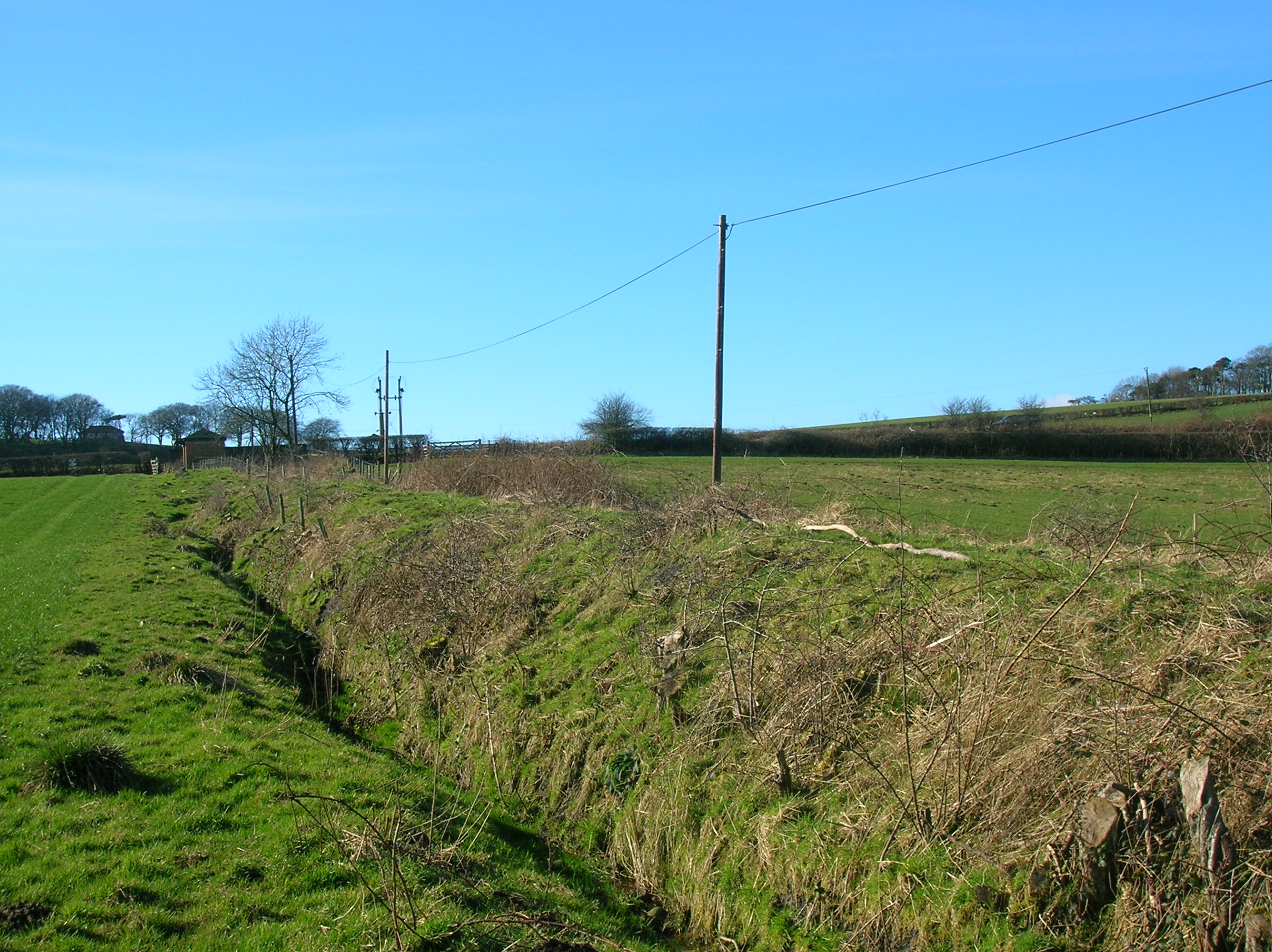
A view of the inclined plane railway's embankment

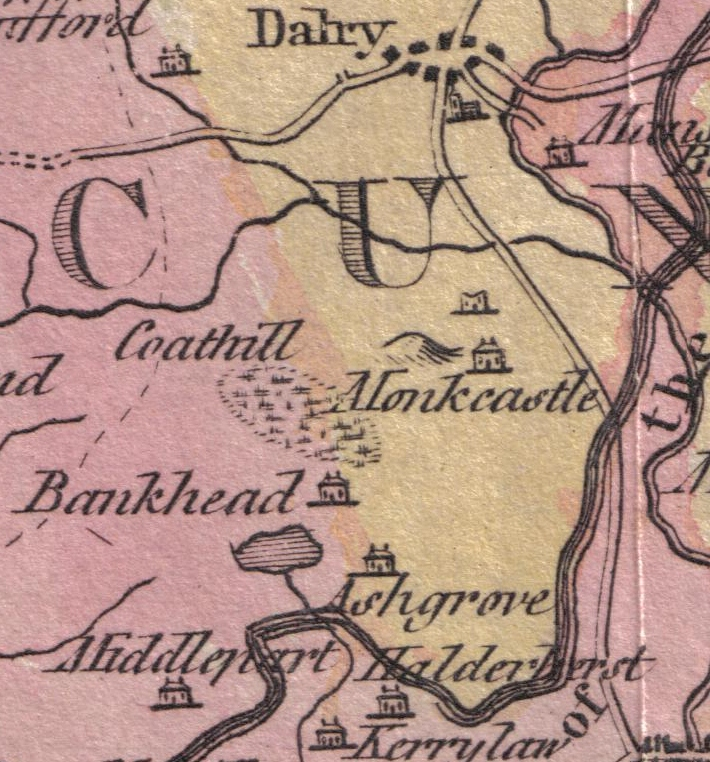
Monkcastle in 1811

Until 1945 the Douglas Firebrick Company Ltd had its works located where the Wilson Car Auction company now trades (2010). A double track narrow gauge railway, working through a gravity driven 'cable and pulleys' system ran from the works to the fireclay mine on the lands of High Monkcastle.

The surface of the inclined plane railroad was paved with firebricks, for employees to walk up the tracks to get to the main Dalry to Kilwinning road where they could catch a bus. The small brick structure gave them shelter from the weather, while they waited.

== Bessie Dunlop of Lynn ==
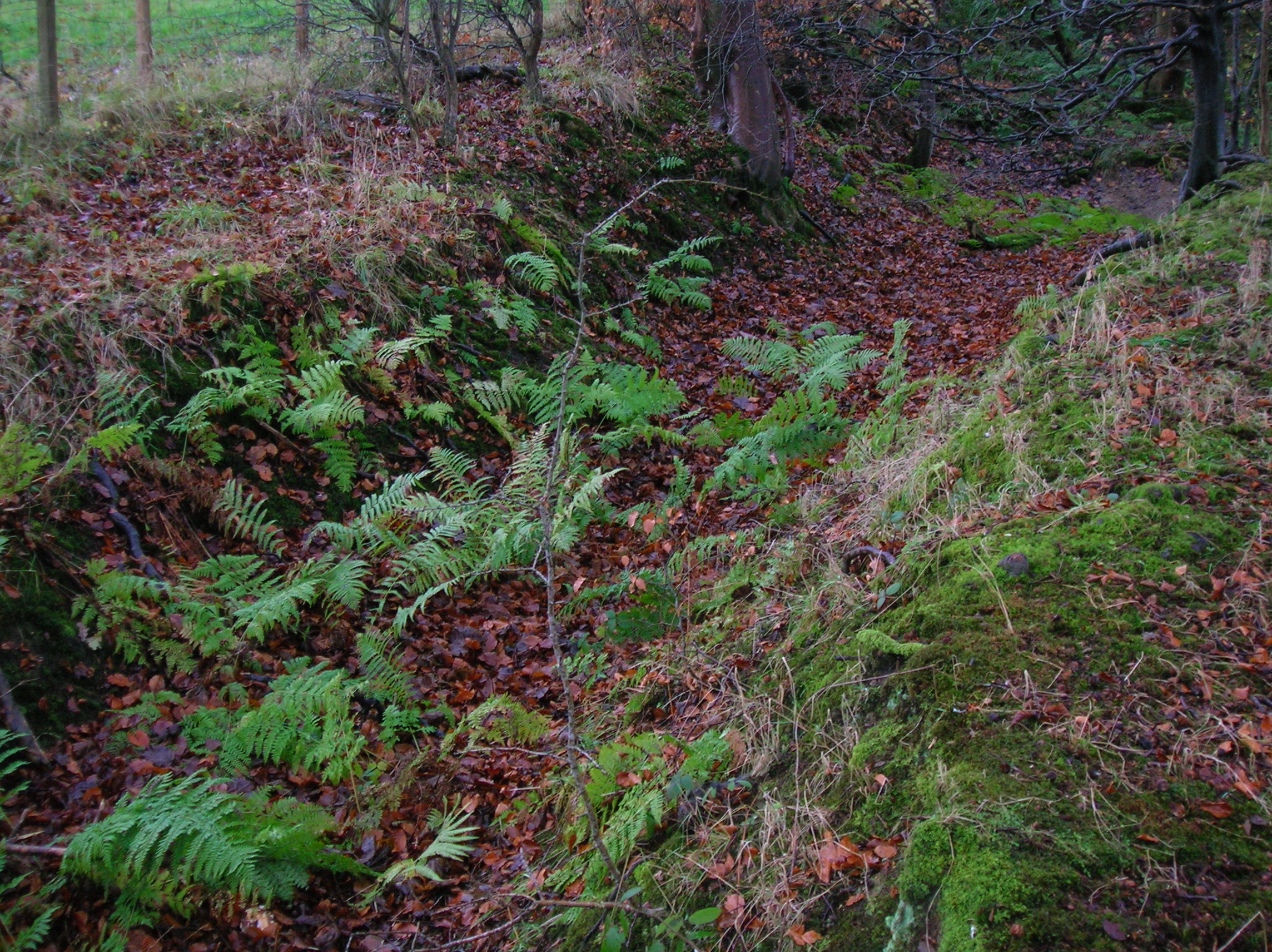
The old course of the previously diverted Monkcastle Burn

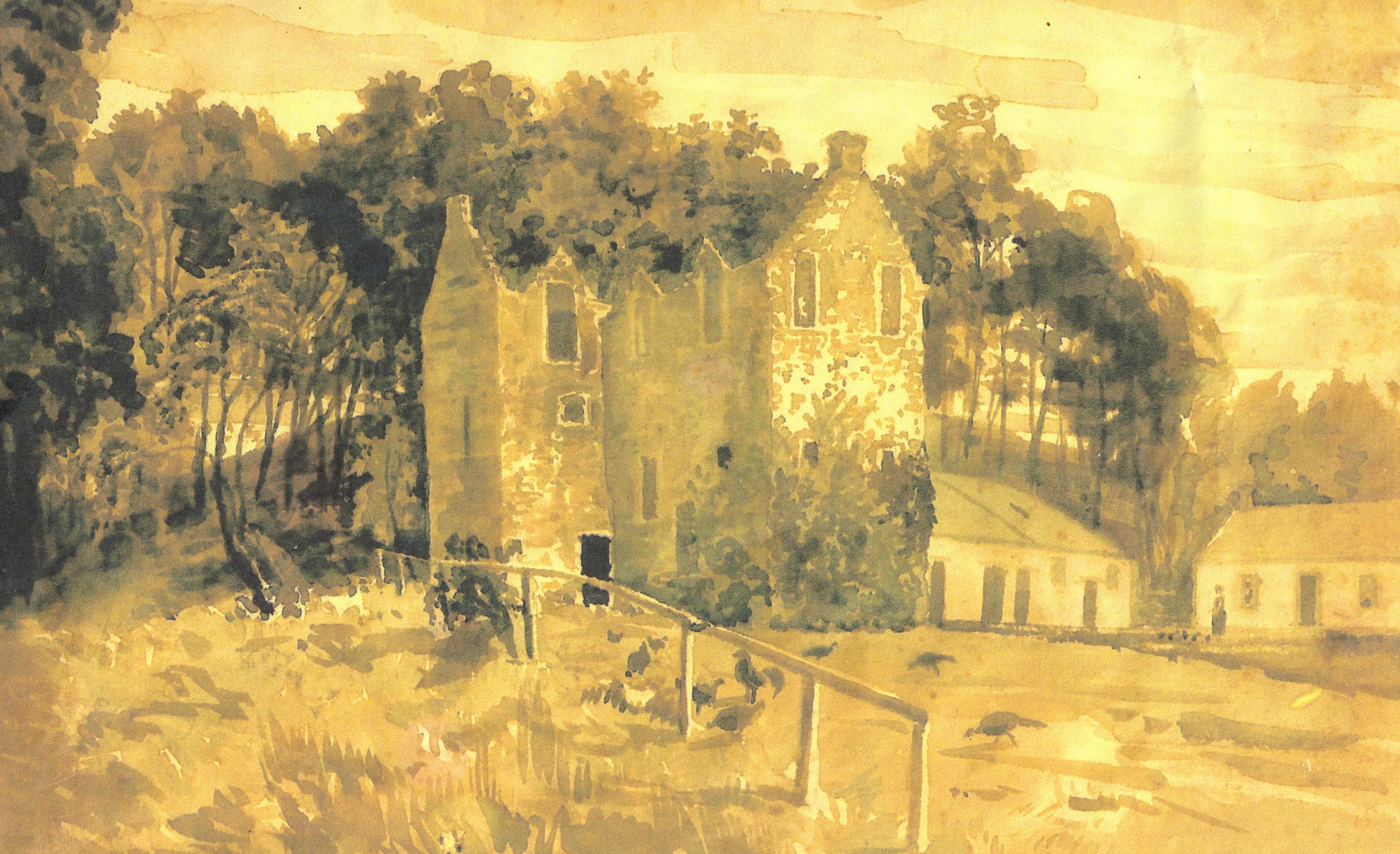
Monkcastle and Monkcastle's home farm buildings in 1906

On 8 November 1576, midwife Bessie Dunlop, resident of Lynne, in Dalry, was accused of sorcery and witchcraft. She answered her accusers that she received information on prophecies or to the whereabouts of lost goods from a Thomas Reid, a former barony officer in Dalry who died at the Battle of Pinkie some 30 years before.

She said she first met him while walking between her own house and the yard of Monkcastle, and after a discussion he disappeared through a hole in a wall or dyke, apparently too small for a normal person to pass through. Bessie also met with the warlock Laird of Auchenskeigh at a thorn tree near to Monkcastle.

She said she was trained by her "familiar" on how to make and use ointments to heal livestock and people. She was said to have cured and advised various people from poor children to gentry. As a “wise woman” her strange efforts at the time attracted the attention of the law. Her abilities were more akin to today’s current psychics, and with an understanding of medicinal herbs, she was identified in a time of witchcraft hysteria. It resulted in a conviction, and she was burned at the stake at Castle Hill in Edinburgh in 1576. Alternatively, she is said to have been burned at the stake at Corsehillmuir, just outside Kilwinning.

== Monkcastle Glen ==
A rocky glen runs up from Monkcastle with a significant waterfall and a listing as part of a Scottish Wildlife Trust local site for nature conservation. The glen was partly formed from quarrying work for freestone. A previous course of the Monkcastle Burn can still be followed and this probably resulted from the quarrying intruding into the original course of the burn at the head of the glen resulting in a waterfall and the burn then following the bed of the glen itself. The geology consists of Carboniferous limestone, macroporphyritic basalt, and an overlay of basalt and boulder clay. The quarry workers are thought to have made used of Old Monkcastle as office space for storage, etc. The OS maps show that quarrying had ceased by the start of the 20th century.

The woodland policies at Monkcastle are classified as one of the relatively few North Ayrshire 'Ancient Woodland' sites. Aspen (Populus tremulans) has been recorded here; liverworts, ferns, and mosses are common due to the conditions of continuous high humidity. The Scottish Wildlife Trust (SWT) have designated Monkcastle as part of Listed Wildlife or Local Site for Nature Conservation (LSNC) number 27, together with Monkcastle House, Dalgarven and Smithstone. Aspen (Populus tremula) is the most notable species present; however, the presence of broad-leafed helleborine (Epipactis helleborine) indicates a woodland containing many mature deciduous trees of some habitat value, together with wet flushes containing yellow flag iris, soft rush, lesser spearwort and golden saxifrage.

=== Mick's Pond ===
An area of open water known as Mick's Pond was created for John Coleman by Michael McMorn in the 2000s to the north and this site has been successful in attracting a good number of diverse waterfowl to the habitats created. Several hardwood trees within the policies have been added to the Woodland Trusts 'Ancient and Notable Trees' register.

== Micro-history ==
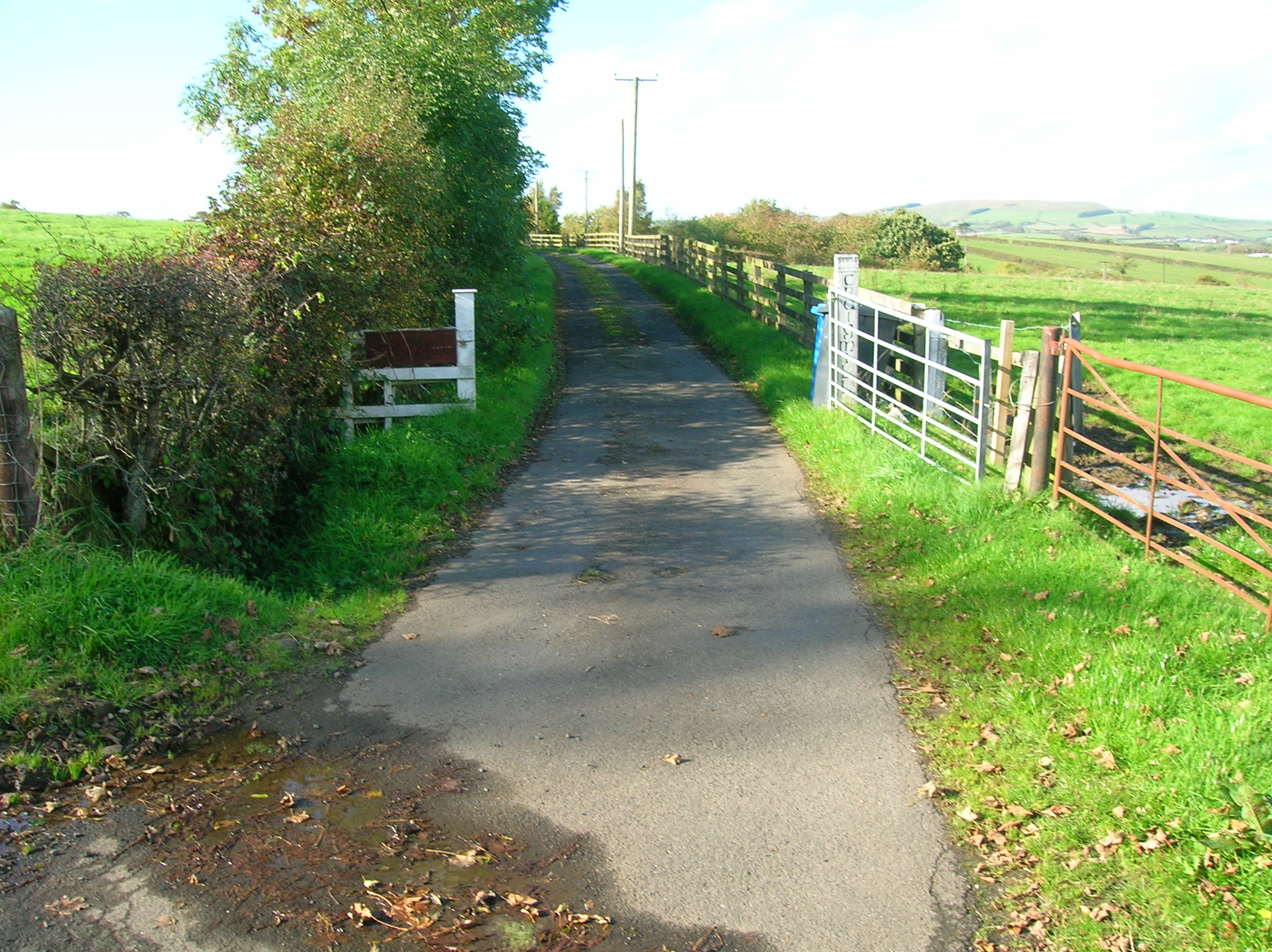
The old Monk's road into Craigmill

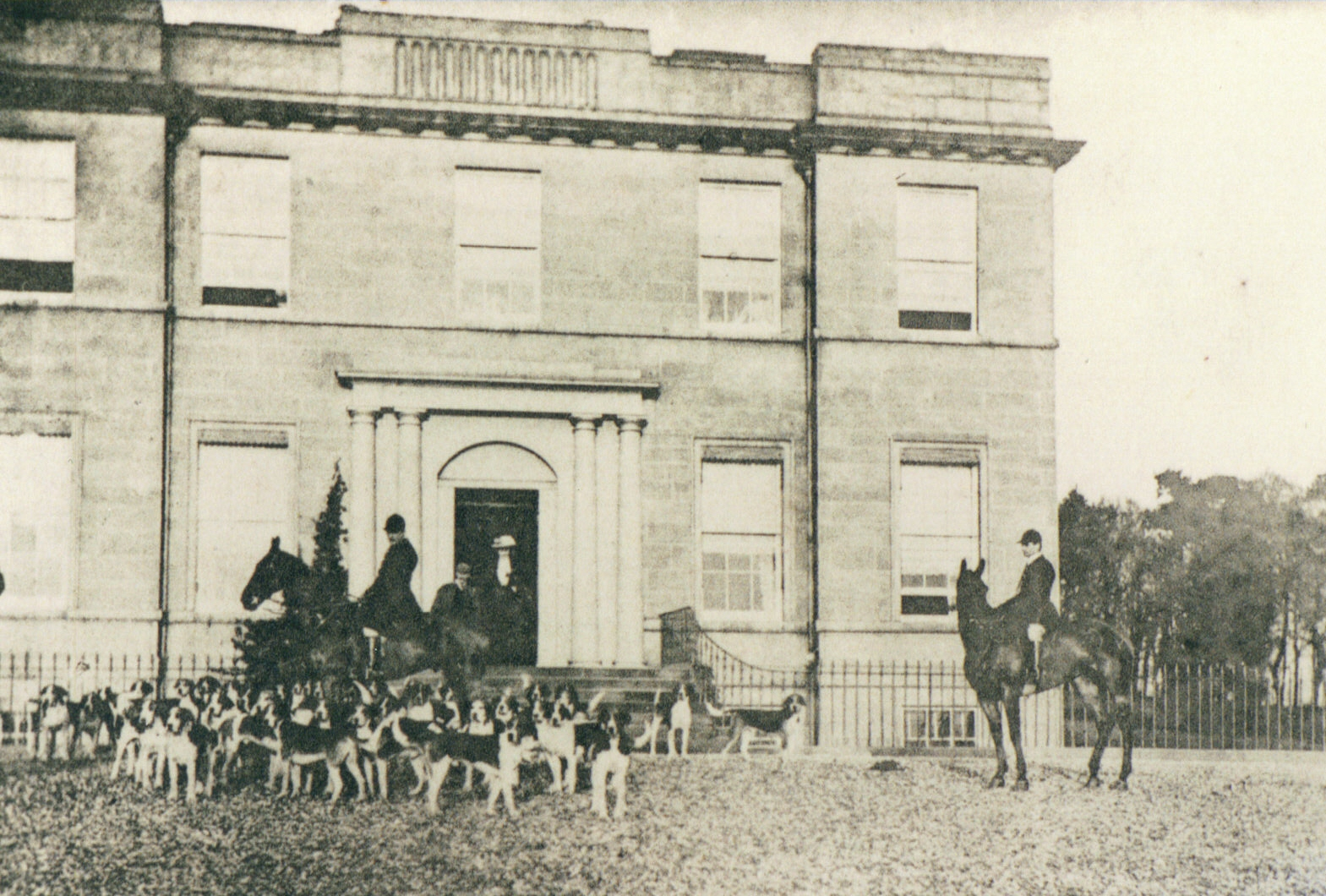
Monkcastle House and the Eglinton Hunt

In February 1903 the Ardrossan and Saltcoats Herald recorded that "Through the kindness of Mr and Mrs Grant of Monkcastle, the tenentry and servants were entertained to their annual supper and dance on Friday evening. Over 50 were present".

In 1780 it was legally settled that the right of the superiority deriving from the Duke of Hamilton was stronger than that arising from the Earl of Eglinton.

In the Memorables of Robin Cummell the castle is said to have built by the "Wee Pechs, langsyne." Pechs are translatable as pygmies, picts, or essentially the 'wee folk'.

The 'Monkcastle' element of the title 'Duke of Abercorn, Paisley and Monkcastle' has transmogrified into 'Mountcastle' and several streets in Edinburgh have acquired this version of the placename.

J. Archibald Brownlie of Monkcastle married Jessie Clark daughter of Robert Clark.

Captain Alexander Montgomerie lived at Monkcastle House in the 20th century.

Kilwinning Monkcastle was the name of a local football club, formed as a senior team in 1883 and disbanded in 1900 due to mounting debts. James Allan, born at Monkcastle, played successively for Monkcastle, Kilwinning, Queen’s Park, and appeared occasionally for (Glasgow) Rangers.

Mr Miller of Monkcastle was one of the official guests at the Eglinton Tournament of 1839.

== See also ==
- Bessie Dunlop of Lynn
- Towerlands, North Ayrshire
