= List of listed buildings in Fenwick, East Ayrshire =

This is a list of listed buildings in the parish of Fenwick in East Ayrshire, Scotland.

== List ==
Name	Location	Date Listed	Grid Ref. (Note: Sometimes known as OSGB36, the grid reference (where provided) is based on the British national grid reference system used by the Ordnance Survey. • "Guide to National Grid". Ordnance Survey. • "Get-a-map". Ordnance Survey.)	Geo-coordinates	Notes	LB Number (Note: Historic Environment Scotland assign a unique alphanumeric identifier to each designated site in Scotland, for listed buildings this always begins with "LB", for example "LB12345".)	Image
No. 66 Main Road				55°39′35″N 4°26′40″W	Category B	12492	Upload Photo
Nos. 93-105 Main Road (Odd Numbers)				55°39′43″N 4°26′38″W	Category C(S)	12494	Upload Photo
Nos. 12, 14, 16, 18 And 20 Main Road Laigh Fenwick				55°39′13″N 4°26′49″W	Category B	12502	Upload Photo
Bruntland Bridge				55°39′19″N 4°25′13″W	Category B	12512	Upload Photo
77-83 (Odd Nos) Main Road				55°39′39″N 4°26′42″W	Category C(S)	13048	Upload Photo
Nos. 68-78 Main Road (Even Numbers)				55°39′36″N 4°26′41″W	Category C(S)	12493	Upload Photo
Nos 82-88 Main Road (Even Numbers)				55°39′41″N 4°26′38″W	Category C(S)	12495	Upload Photo
Nos. 92-106 (Even Nos.) Main Road And No. 2 Skernieland Road				55°39′43″N 4°26′36″W	Category C(S)	12498	Upload Photo
Nos. 6 And 8 Kirkton Road				55°39′40″N 4°26′35″W	Category C(S)	12500	Upload Photo
Nos. 48, 50, 52 And 54 Main Road, Laigh Fenwick				55°39′19″N 4°26′44″W	Category B	12503	Upload Photo
Hallhouse				55°39′15″N 4°26′48″W	Category B	12506	Upload Photo
20-22 (Even Nos) Maunsheugh Road				55°39′34″N 4°26′30″W	Category B	12499	Upload Photo
Mansefield, Kirkton Road				55°39′40″N 4°26′34″W	Category C(S)	12501	Upload Photo
Waterside Mill, Including 16 Main Road, Waterside				55°39′43″N 4°24′31″W	Category B	12476	Upload Photo
Nos 34-44 Main Road Laigh Fenwick				55°39′15″N 4°26′44″W	Category B	13822	Upload Photo
Harelaw				55°41′36″N 4°24′19″W	Category C(S)	13823	Upload Photo
Manse				55°39′36″N 4°26′30″W	Category B	12491	Upload Photo
John Fulton Memorial Hall Main Road				55°39′16″N 4°26′38″W	Category C(S)	12496	Upload Photo
No. 90 Main Road				55°39′42″N 4°26′37″W	Category C(S)	12497	Upload Photo
No. 39 Main Road				55°39′20″N 4°26′45″W	Category C(S)	12504	Upload Photo
Dalmusternock				55°38′39″N 4°27′20″W	Category B	12507	Upload Photo
Lochgoyn Monument				55°41′37″N 4°20′35″W	Category B	12509	Upload Photo
Parish Church And Graveyard				55°39′38″N 4°26′31″W	Category B	12490	Upload Photo
Retreat Cottage				55°39′21″N 4°26′41″W	Category B	12505	Upload Photo
King's Well				55°42′00″N 4°23′18″W	Category B	12508	Upload Photo
School, Waterside				55°39′40″N 4°24′23″W	Category C(S)	12510	Upload Photo
Waterside Bridge				55°39′44″N 4°24′30″W	Category C(S)	12511	Upload Photo

== Key ==
The scheme for classifying buildings in Scotland is:

- Category A: "buildings of national or international importance, either architectural or historic; or fine, little-altered examples of some particular period, style or building type."
- Category B: "buildings of regional or more than local importance; or major examples of some particular period, style or building type, which may have been altered."
- Category C: "buildings of local importance; lesser examples of any period, style, or building type, as originally constructed or moderately altered; and simple traditional buildings which group well with other listed buildings."

In March 2016 there were 47,288 listed buildings in Scotland. Of these, 8% were Category A, and 50% were Category B, with the remaining 42% being Category C.

== See also ==
- List of listed buildings in East Ayrshire
