= Bessie Dunlop of Lynn =

Scottish woman accused of witchcraft

Bessie Dunlop
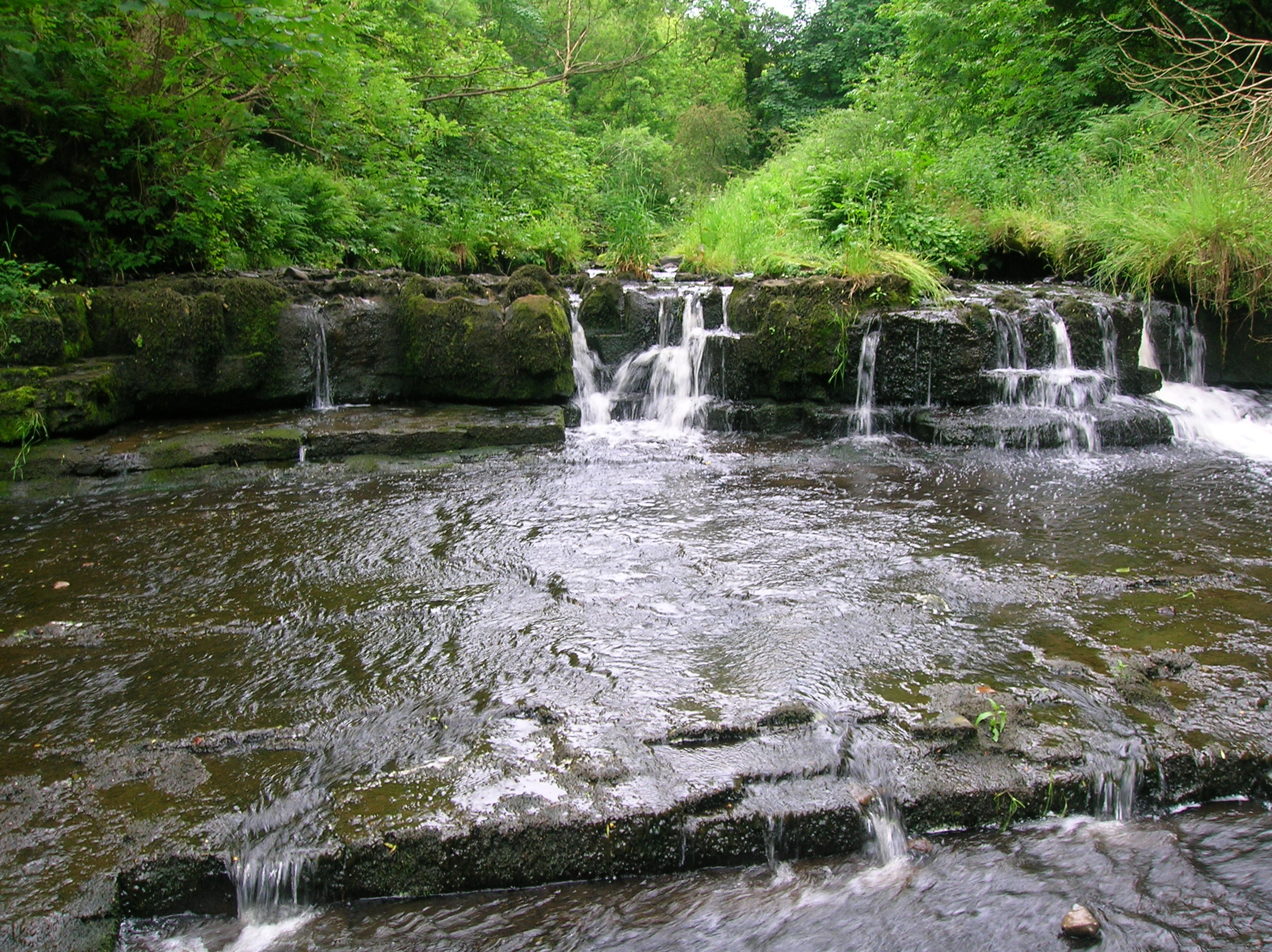
- The Caaf Water in the Lynn Glen
- Born: Scotland
- Died: 1576; Edinburgh, Scotland
- Occupations: Farmer and housewife

Bessie Dunlop, Elizabeth Dunlop or Elizabeth Jack (died 1576), was a Scottish farmer's wife from Ayrshire who was strangled and then her remains burnt, at Edinburgh for the crime of sorcery, witchcraft, and incantations. Her case was unusual in the amount of fine detail related in her testimony and the lack of anything but positive or neutral outcomes of her recorded ministrations and actions. Her admission to the use of a familiar spirit and association with the fairies were the main cause of her conviction and her death sentence.

== Life and character ==
Bessie was the wife of Andrew Jack of Lynn, Lyne, Lin, or Linn, a hamlet and the name of a glen through which the Caaf Water runs, lying in the Barony of Lynn, then owned by Robert, Master of Boyd, eldest son of Lord Boyd. It seems therefore that their farm lay near or at the bottom of the Lynn Glen on the Caaf Water, near Dalry in North Ayrshire, Scotland. She was married to Andrew Jack and her surname suggests an Ayrshire connection as the town of Dunlop in the old Cunninghame district lies in the nearby parish of Dunlop. She is recorded as driving cattle at one point and sheep are also mentioned together with a horse and a journey to Edinburgh and Leith with her husband to collect animal feed, so a small family farm is implied at the very least. Bessie also records a meeting at the 'Thorn of Dawmstarnik' which is probably Dalmusternock on the Kilmarnock to Glasgow road.

A kiln is mentioned on one of the visits of Thomas Reid to Bessie's house and it is possible that her husband was the miller at one of the mills in the Lynn Glen. She was called the 'goodwife' which was one step down from a laird and a miller's wife would have a right to that assignation. She was of child bearing age at the time of these events and had surviving children with another born during the four-year period that she knew Thomas Reid.

Her husband features very little in the story considering how often Thomas Reid is in her company, but very little evidence exists of any impropriety other than the breaking of relatively minor social conventions such as trying to tug her by her apron strings to encourage her to go to the elfhame. A John Jack is mentioned as the father of one of her patients.

== Association with Thomas Reid and the Queen of Elfland ==
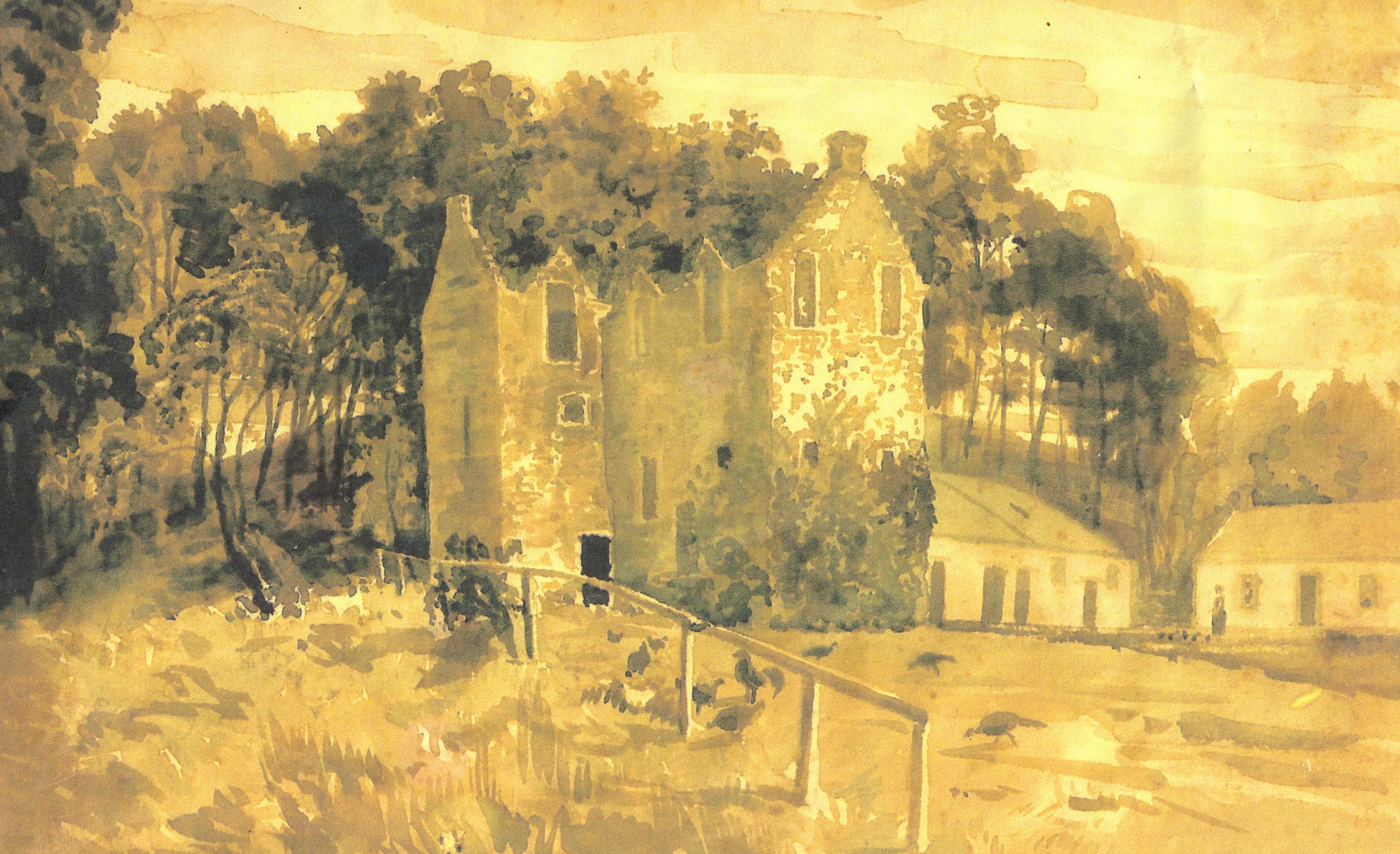
Old Monkcastle and Monkcastle's home farm buildings in 1906

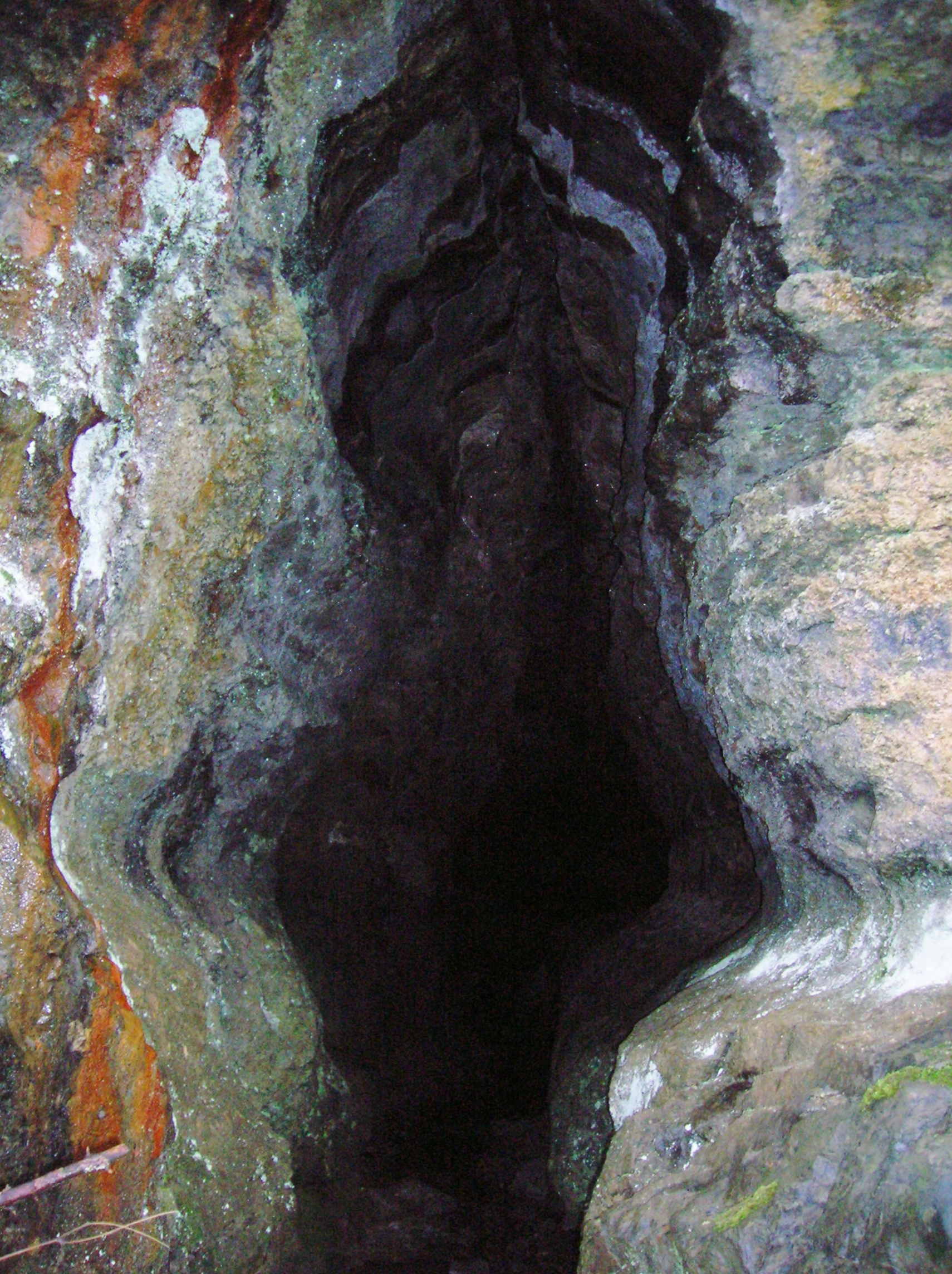
The entrance to the 'Elfhame' at Cleeve Cove in the Disk Water Glen

=== Thomas Reid ===
When Bessie Dunlop was accused of sorcery and witchcraft she answered her accusers that she received information on prophecies, the whereabouts of lost goods and the natural remedies from Thomas or Tom Reid, a former barony officer of Blair near Dalry who claimed to have been killed at the Battle of Pinkie some 29 years before in 1547. She describes him in terms of an elderly, well dressed, honest and respectable man with a long grey beard who carried a white wand. Bessie revealed to her interrogators that she had "Never known him when he was alive", but had first met Thomas or Tom Reid circa 1572 whilst driving cattle to the common grazing between her own house and the yard or garden of Monkcastle and after a discussion he then disappeared through a hole in a wall or dyke at Monkcastle garden, apparently a hole too small for a living person to pass through. Service records that he came out of a stone dyke, more than once, without reference to anything unusual.

On their first meeting she had been crying and at a total loss with worry for a cow had died, her new born was a sickly child, she was still weak from her child birth exertions and finally her husband was taken with 'land ill' and she did not expect him to live. It was at this point that they had first met, when he approached her.

It has been proposed from a number of lines of reasoning that Thomas Reid was actually a Catholic priest or an adherent to that faith, in hiding within the new Protestant regime. He seems to have known her for he greets her with "Gude day, Bessie" and uses the Catholic greeting "Sancta Maria". When she tells him of her troubles he replies in a priest-like fashion first asking "Why must tho make such dole and weeping for any earthly thing?", adding that she must have angered God by questioning him and his advice was to make amends to the Almighty. He had expressed an opinion that the Reformation was not good and when he tries unsuccessfully to draw her away from Christianity he oddly adds a comment about the faith she took at the font-stone. The scene of their first meeting and his supposedly odd disappearance, Monkland or Monkcastle, was a former property of the abbots of Kilwinning Abbey that may have afforded a good place to hide and had many small holes or gaps in garden walls, an ice house, the main dwelling and its cellars, etc. that could be seen as too small to squeeze through, especially as he was at some distance from her at the time. He himself said that he lived with the fairies in the Elfhame.

Thomas Reid's death at the Battle of Pinkie is unconfirmed, but his employer, John Blair, did die at the battle. The evidence for Thomas Reid being a ghost is not overwhelming for he is abroad during the day, physically able to hold objects, tug on her apron and even handle fruit, etc. His passage through a narrow hole in a wall or dyke is ambiguous at best and others being unaware of his presence in her house when her husband is busy talking to three tailors is again a matter of opinion as to how this should be interpreted. She is forbidden to speak to him when others are present, such as in Dalry and Edinburgh. His dealings with the members of the 'Court of the Elves' is also open to interpretation as to who they really were. The regular visits she made on his behalf to his son and relatives adds to the general picture of a man in hiding constantly covering his tracks as does an odd incident when Bessie visits a survivor of the Battle of Pinkie with proof of who sent her but no clear reason for the visit.

=== The Court of the Elfhame ===
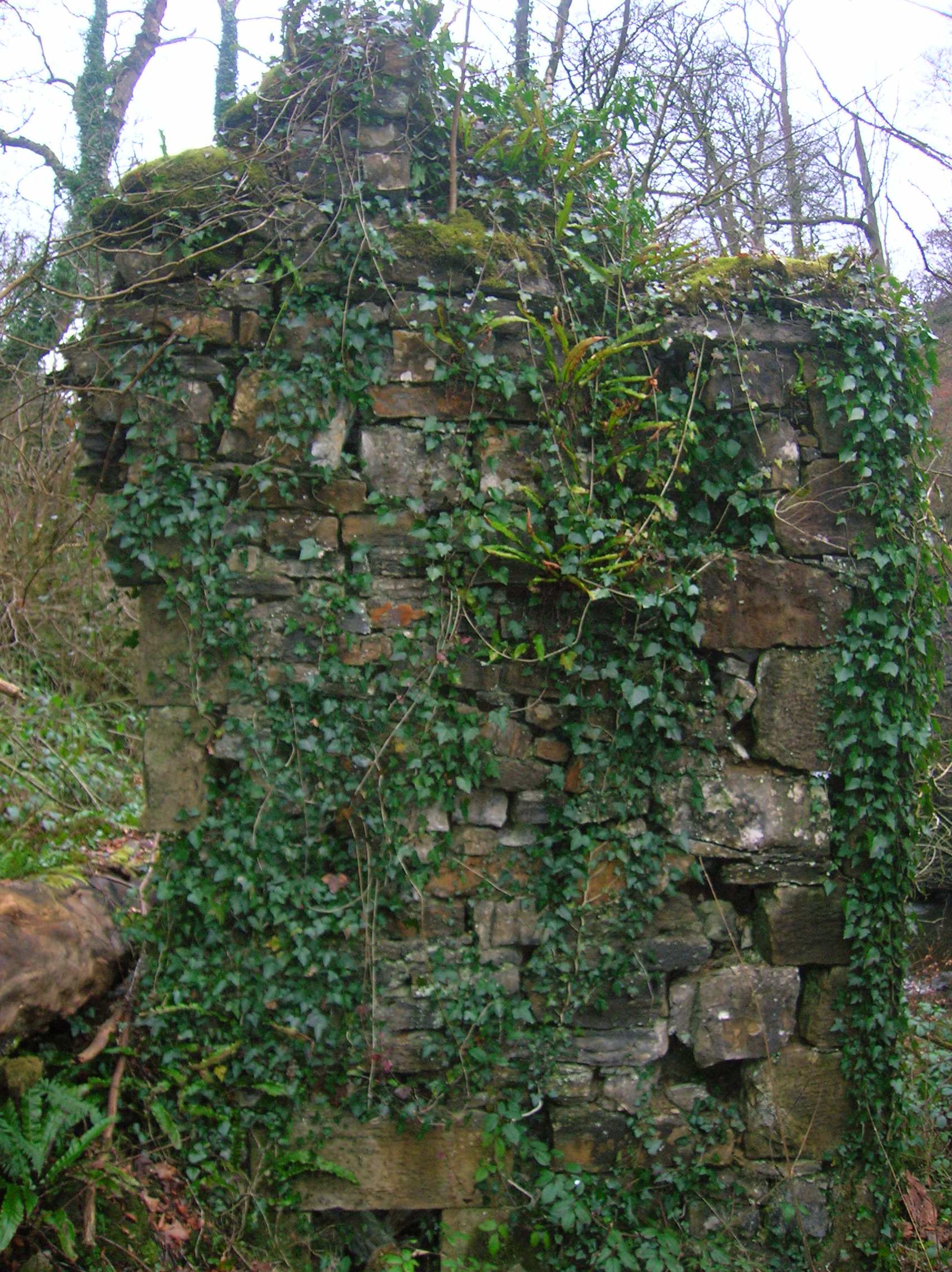
The gable end of the Caaf Mill in Lynn Glen on the Caaf Water

Bessie asked Thomas why she had been chosen as the recipient of his time, knowledge and advice, the answer was that he had been ordered to help her by the Queen of Elfland. It transpired that at the time of her recent labour a stout lady had come to her door seeking a drink and this was none other than the Queen herself. A drink had been provided and this element brings various traditional folklore aspects into the equation such as a changeling child as hers was sickly and both she and Thomas predicted its death as well as the recovery of her husband.

Bessie once met Thomas at the 'Thorn of Dawmstarnik' (probably Dalmusternock Farm near Craufurdland Castle) on the Glasgow to Kilmarnock road where he tried to persuade her to deny Christendom in return for living a 'life of luxury'. She turned him down flat and he left in disgust however he appeared again not long after at her home and this time he had eight women and four men from the Court of Elfland who hoped to persuade her to join them. Oddly Thomas had advised her not to speak and they left with a horrible howling hurricane-like sound. They were dressed smartly and Thomas referred to them as 'good wights' or fairies.

Bessie on one occasion had tied up her horse near Edinburgh at Restalrig Loch when she became aware of a group of riders passing and vanishing into the lake. Thomas explained that these were the fairies on one of their "cavalcades upon earth."

=== The Elfhame of the Blair ===
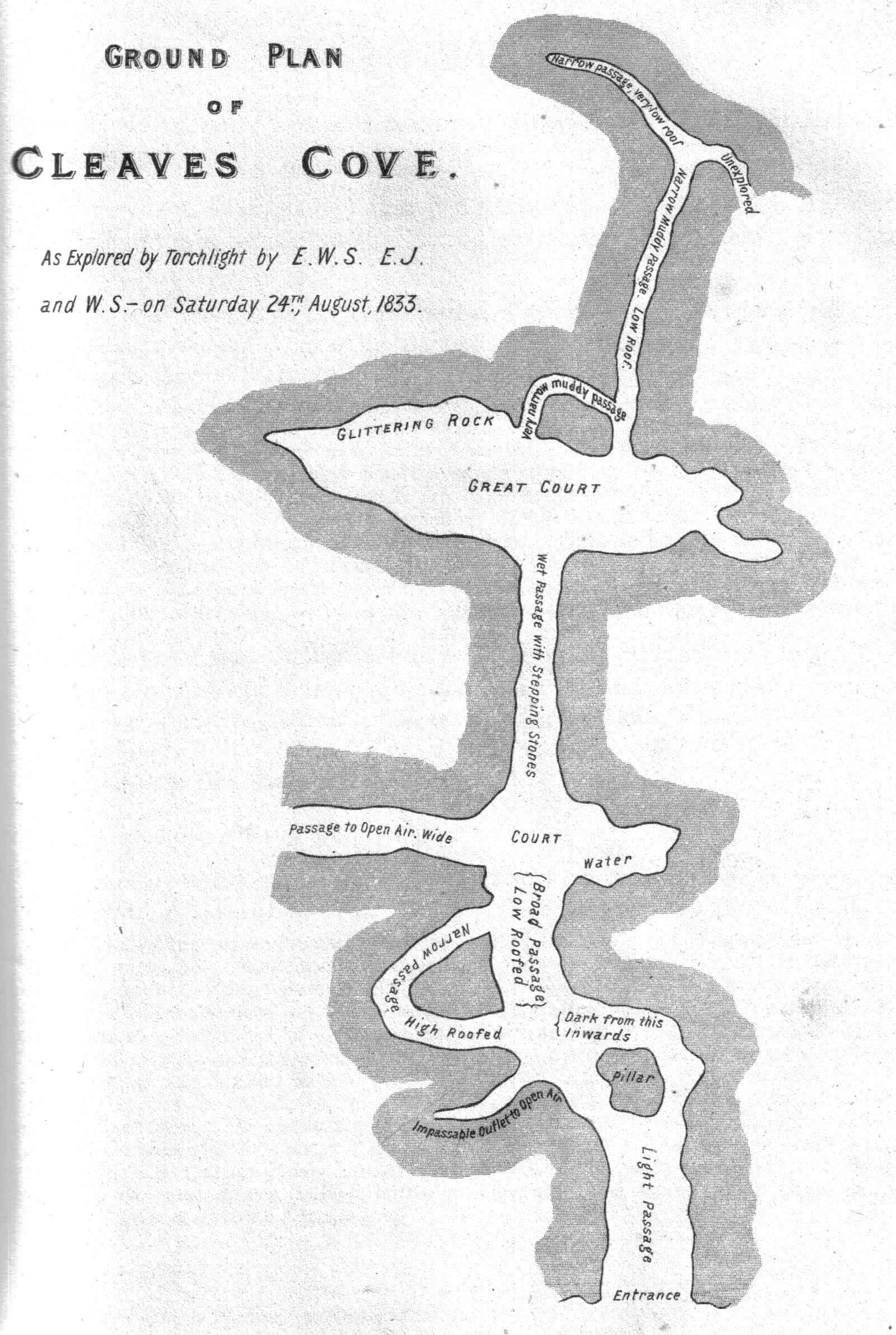
A map of the Cleaves Cove - The Elfhame o'the Blair

An interesting associated aspect of Bessie Dunlop's story is that the extensive limestone Cleeves Cove site, one of Ayrshire's greatest natural history sites, lies on the Dusk Water only a few miles from Lynn Glen and Monkcastle. As the barony officer to the Blair, Thomas Reid would have known this area well. Tradition records that the caves were the "Elfhame o'the Blair" or the 'Elfhouse' and the locals at that time believed that these magical creatures had made this their abode within the many chamber containing stalactites and stalagmites. At Halloween it was said they would come riding out of the caves on horses that were the size of mice, their long yellow hair straming or tied in knots with crimps of gold. Their quaichs were acorn cups and they drank wine beneath the toadstools. Their clothes were green velvet and their arrows were made of moss-reed tipped with flint arrow heads that were dipped in hemlock poison. The bows were made from the rib bones of unbaptised babies who had been secretly buried in the shaws and glens. It is not known how old these 'Elfhame' traditions are, however excavation shows that it was dwelt in by man and was used by Covenanters seeking a hiding place from the king's troops.

== Healing and other practices ==
The veracity of Bessie's testimony at court will never be known for sure, however torture seems to have been used as Service records that a "witch doctor, a skeillie man, was fetched frae yont Glesco' to deal wi' the case". He goes on to say that she was stripped and a search made for the Devil's Mark and she was also "scored abune the breath", that is being slashed with a knife above the mouth as a form of torture used on witches and that other tortures may have been used. She does not seem to have benefited financially from the help that she gave people although gifts of food are noted such as "a peck of meal and some cheese". Bessie had various clients from the aristocracy and merchant class, none of whom came to her assistance at her trial. The Laird of Stanely's wife, daughter of Lady Johnstone sought Bessie’s assistance when her daughter became ill and Bessie prepared a potion of strong ale, bolstered with ginger, cloves, aniseed and liquorice. Lady Kilbowie was suffering from a 'crooked leg' and Thomas this time advised that nothing could be done to help the elderly patient without making the condition worse. Lady Thirdpart in the barony of Renfrewshire involved Bessie in the search for gold coins stolen from her purse and indeed the money was found after Bessie named the thief.

William Blair of the Strand in Dalry is an example of a person who received unsolicited advice. William Blair’s eldest daughter was due to be married to the Crawford Laird of Baidland. Bessie advised him of dire consequences if the marriage went ahead such as madness and suicide. The Laird of Baidland agreed to marry William Blair’s youngest daughter although the thoughts of the elder sister are not recorded.

Bessie had some involvement in midwifery, disclosing that as usual she could do nothing for them without Thomas's assistance, specifically he gave her a green silk lace that she tied around her clients left arm in contact with the skin. She treated the children of John Jack and Wilson of Townhead with herbs and they recovered.

== Events leading to the trial and execution ==
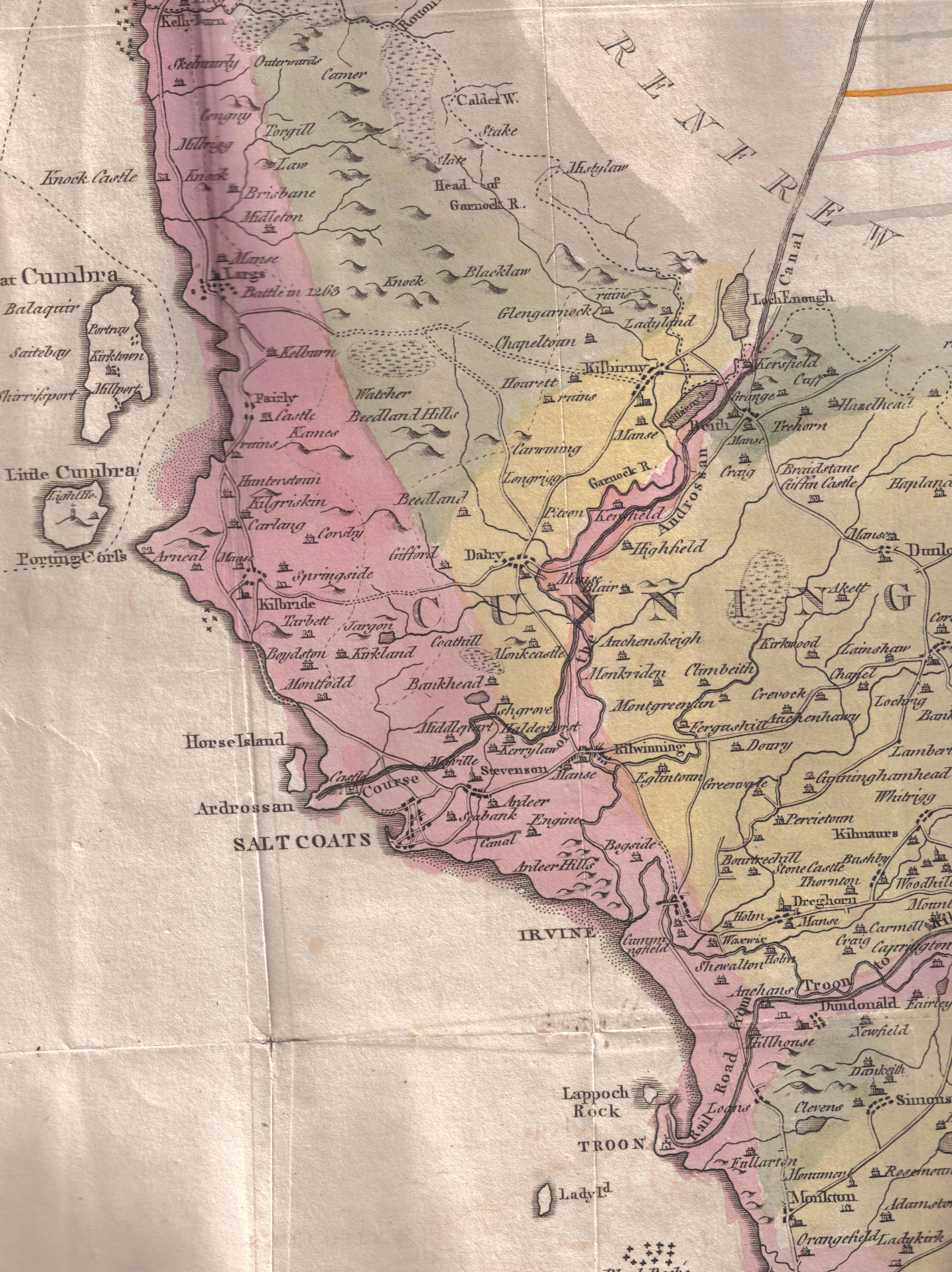
An 1811 map showing Dalry, Monkcastle, the Blair, etc.

Bessie's problems with the authorities seem to have started with the incident regarding the theft of a cloak belonging to a Hugh Scott. William Kyle, an Irvine burgess, had come to her about this and after gaining a promise of his discretion about her involvement she told him that the culprit was one Mally Boyd, who had quickly made the cloak into a kirtle to disguise her actions. William Kyle dealt with this failure to recover the item by having Bessie arrested and confined in Irvine's tolbooth until released thanks to an influential acquaintance, James Blair.

James Jamieson and James Baird of Mains of Watterton asked for Bessie's help over the theft of plough-irons, of which two blacksmiths, Gabriel and George Black, were accused and the items were said to have been moved to their father’s house at Locharside. The Archbishop of Glasgow, James Boyd of Trochrig, was brought into the affair when the blacksmiths took official steps to try to repair their reputations. William Dougal, sheriff's officer, is also said to have taken a bribe of £3 not to find the plough-irons.

Bessie's public profile had been growing and unwanted attention was focussing on her activities. She was then accused by person or persons unknown of "the using of sorcerie, witchcraft and incantatione, with invocation of spretis of the devill, continewand in familiarite with thame, at all sic tymes as sche thocht expedient, deling with charmes, and abusing pepill with devillisch craft of sorcerie foirsaid .. usit thie divers yeiris bypast". She was made to confess by sleep deprivation, a torture known as "waking". This was in 1576, thirteen years after Scotland had passed the Witchcraft Act. She was taken to the High Court of Justiciary in Dalkeith 20 September 1576 and on 8 November she was found guilty and sentenced to be strangled and then burnt. on Castle Hill in Edinburgh.
