= The Lands of Pitcon =

Coordinates: 55.7191°N 4.7099°W

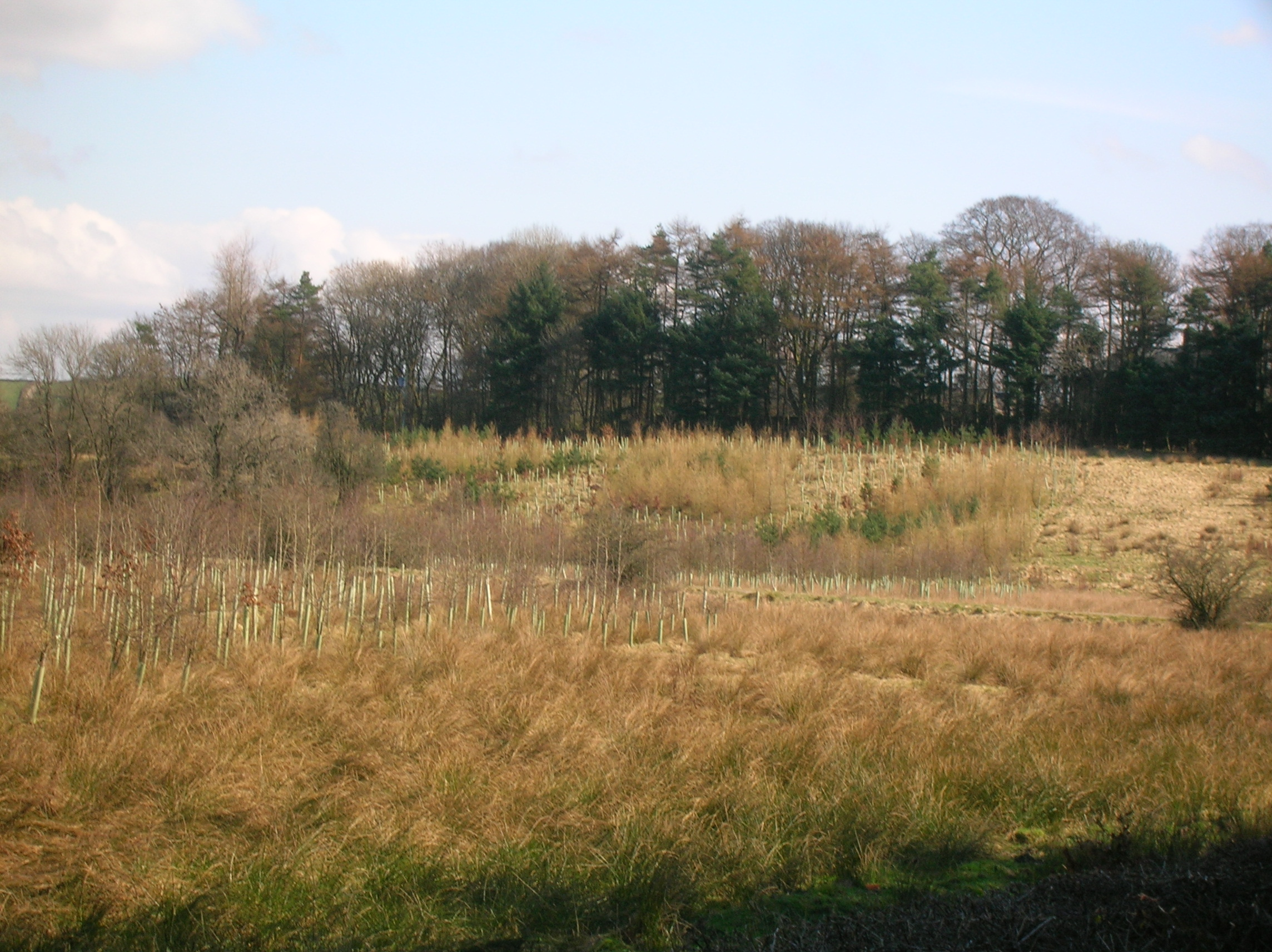
The Pitcon Knoll.

The Lands of Pitcon, previously Potconnel now form a small estate of around 100 acres in the Parish of Dalry, North Ayrshire in the old Barony of Dalry. The present category B listed Georgian mansion house (OS NS 229879, 650628) dating from 1787, replaces an older castellated dwelling. Pitcon lies on the outskirts of Drakemyres, now a suburb of Dalry, close to the confluence of the Rye Water, River Garnock, and the Mains Burn, standing on a low knoll. Such a marshy area would have provided a degree of protection to the old castle.

== History ==
=== The Mansion house and walled garden ===
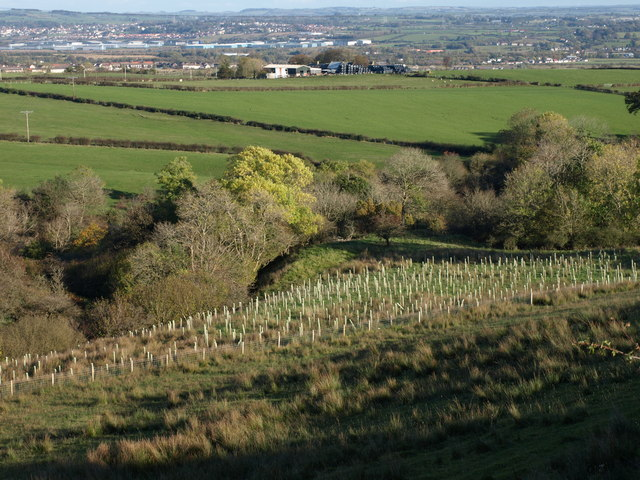
The Pitcon Burn and the view towards Boag Farm

The location of the Pitcon Estate, North Ayrshire

The OS Name Book of 1856 records that the western end of the building had been part of the ancient dwelling and a summer house bore the arms of the Boyd family, and a stone inscribed 'Thomas Boyd 1530'. By 1956 the ancient part of Pitcon had been demolished and the stones noted in 1856 were in the wall of the walled garden. A marriage stone inscribed '1660 RB AW' is located in the wall of an outhouse.

Paterson records that the old manor house stood close to the present building.

The present Pitcon mansion house mainly dates from 1787, a new wing having been added in the 1920s to plans drawn up by James Houston. An old stone dated 1660 is incorporated into the laundry house. The walled garden dates from the late 18th century.

=== The estate ===
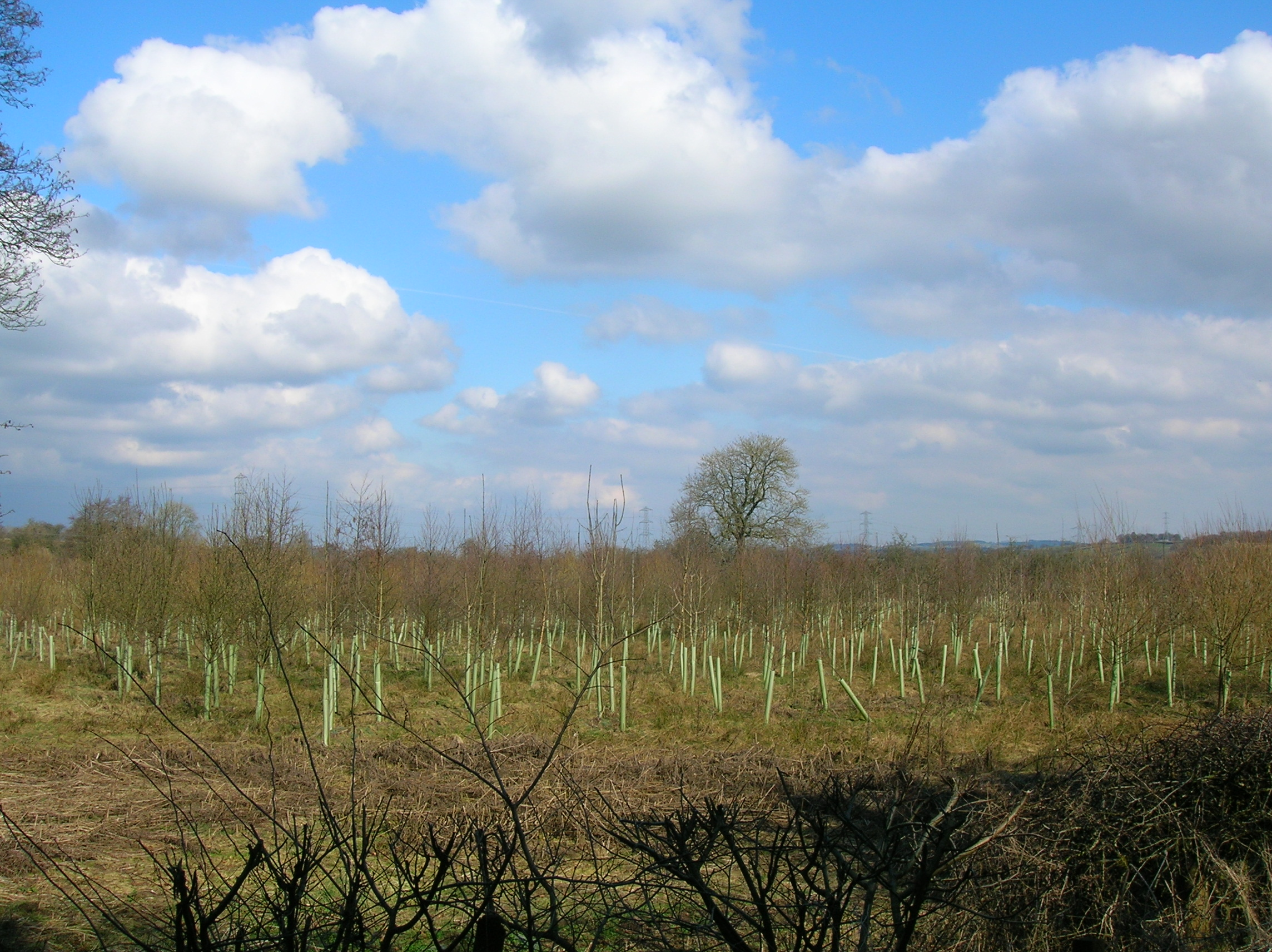
Tree planting on the site of old ironstone pits.

The Lands of Pitcon were "a seven merk land of old extent" and were given to Thomas Boyd by his father, Alexander Boyd, who was in turn given the lands by his father, Robert, the first Lord Boyd, also Great Chamberlain of Scotland. Thomas Boyd in 1608 also held 'Linget-rig' (Lintseedridge) in Over Mains of Pitcon, and Nether Mains of Pitcon. He also held the Chapel Lands near Fairlie Crevoch in the parish of Stewarton.

In the mid 19th century a valuable stratum of ironstone was discovered and exploited, leaving substantial mining remnants from two pits, their mineral railways and waste tips, that were close by. Several other ironstone pits were in the vicinity as shown by the OS maps of the time. Extensive tree planting has helped to hide the scars of this industrial activity of the past.

The lodge house, Pitcon Cottage, is marked on mid 18th century OS maps but no longer exists. A network of estate roads existed with a ford crossing the River Garnnock before the mineral railway was built.

== The Lairds of Pitcon ==
The Pitcon family are recorded as holders of the property since the 13th century, Sir Robert Pitcon is recorded in 1488, William Pitcon was the Chamberlain of Kilwinning in 1557 and Hugh Pitcon is recorded as holding Lintseed Ridge in 1693. In 1520, Pitcon was held by Alexander Pitcon of that Ilk, indicating that the family name was the same as the name of their property. The surname 'Pitcon' is rarely encountered, however the contraction 'Conn' is more commonly encountered.

=== The Boyds ===
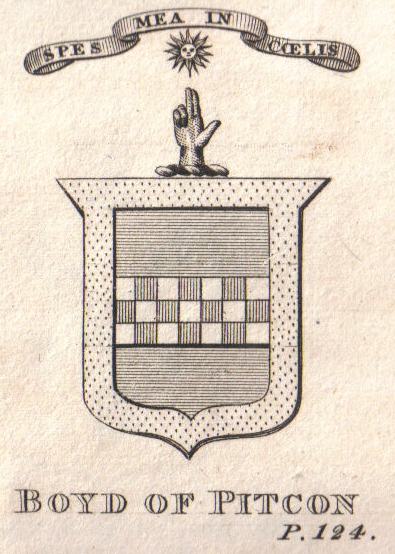
The Coat of Arms of the Boyds of Pitcon.

The Coat of Arms of the Cuninghames of Caddel.

King Robert the Bruce conferred the Barony of Dalry upon Sir Robert Boyd and the first Boyd of Pitcon was Thomas Boyd. In 1632 Thomas was styled of Lin, a nearby property customarily spelled Lyn or Lynn. The Boyds had acquired part of the minor barony of Lynn in 1532, when John Lynn "for a sum of money to him paid, sold" to Thomas Boyd "forty-shilling land of the old extent of Lyn". The earliest reference to a Boyd of Pitcon in all the document extracts at the website of the National Archives of Scotland is dated 1571 and relates to Thomas Boyd of Pitcon.

Thomas was the brother of Robert Boyd of Kilmarnock, married Marion Fairlie, daughter of John Fairlie of that Ilk and was buried at the family burial ground in Kilmarnock. He predeceased his wife whose second husband was James Stewart, giving rise to the line that led to the Marquess of Bute. His son, also Thomas, together with his brother Richard supported Mary Queen of Scots and fought at the Battle of Langside; they were both pardoned.

In 1608 Thomas Boyd, son of Thomas, inherited and married Isabell, heiress of William Glen of Barr, dying young in 1617 however and succeeded by his son Robert, who married Anna Blair in 1633, the daughter of Brice Blair of that Ilk. Bryce Boyd inherited the lands from his father in about 1650 and married Isabell Henderson, daughter of Henderson of Baike. This Isabell later married Alexander Crawfurd of Fergushill as Bryce Boyd died in 1660. Thomas Boyd, heir to Bryce, married Agnes Scott and had a son Robert who inherited, dying before 1725 when his son Thomas inherited; this heir was the last of the Pitcon Boyd male line and sold Pitcon to George MacRae. He was comptroller of the Customs in Irvine and had four daughters, three of whom married, however the sons did not marry. Thomas Boyd in 1696 married Janet, daughter of John Cunninghame of Caddel.

The Arms of the Boyds of Pitcon were the same as the Kilmarnock branch of the family, with the motto; "Spes mea in Colis" (My hope is in heaven).

=== Macrae, Robison and others ===
George MacRae or McCree, a wine merchant from Ayr, purchased the lands in 1770 from the last of the Boyds of Pitcon and after the ruin of the originally Ayr based Douglas, Heron and Company's Bank the estate was sold by his creditors in 1787, James Robison being the purchaser. Mrs Ann Robison Orr, his sister, inherited as he had no direct heir, and she left the property to a distant relative, John Cockburn, on the condition that he took the name Robison. In the 1829 John Cockburn sold Pitcon for £13,000 to Dr Ebenezer Smith of Kilmarnock, who in turn sold the estate to a Glasgow based merchant, Alexander Alison of Lintseedridge. The Eglinton Iron Company, in the persons of James Baird of Camusdoon and others, held the Pitcon lands in 1874.

The McCosh family held Pitcon since at least the 1920s. In 2011 the estate with 96.87 acres of land was purchased by Dr Michael Boles and Mrs Robin Boles, LVO.

== Micro-history ==
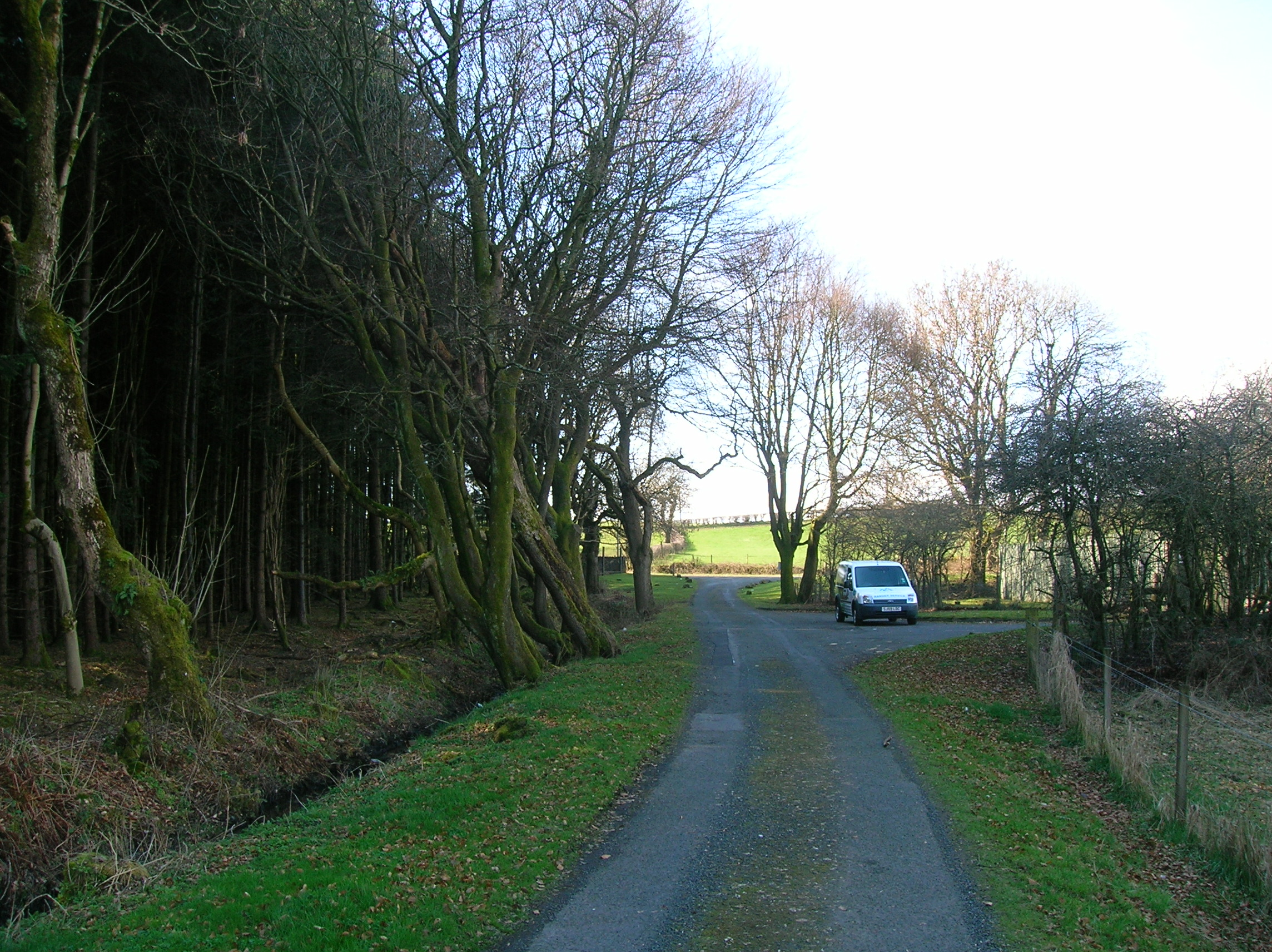
The Pitcon driveway road end

Thomas Boyd, the last of Pitcon, was Baillie for the area to the Right Hon. Patrick Lindsay-Crawfurd, 2nd Viscount of Garnock in 1730. John Boyd of Pitcon married Marion Cunninghame of Carlung, the last of her line in the early 18th century. Thomas Boyd, son of Bryce, was a Commissioner of Supply for the County of Ayr in 1695 and 1703. His daughter Jane married Andrew Macredie of Perceton. The laird of Pitcon held Monkcastle at one time, having obtained it from George Hay, and later it passed to John Wallace, minister of Largs in the 17th century. Saint Margaret's parish church in Dalry contains an oak armorial pew decoration, the shield of Blair impaled with that of Boyd of Pitcon, and this now adorns a transept wall.

A Pitcon Brickworks was located near Dalry.

== See also ==
- Clan Boyd
- Dalry
