= Dalmusternock, East Ayrshire =

Dower house in East Ayrshire, Scotland

Dalmusternock
- Fenwick, East Ayrshire, Scotland; UK grid reference NS455417
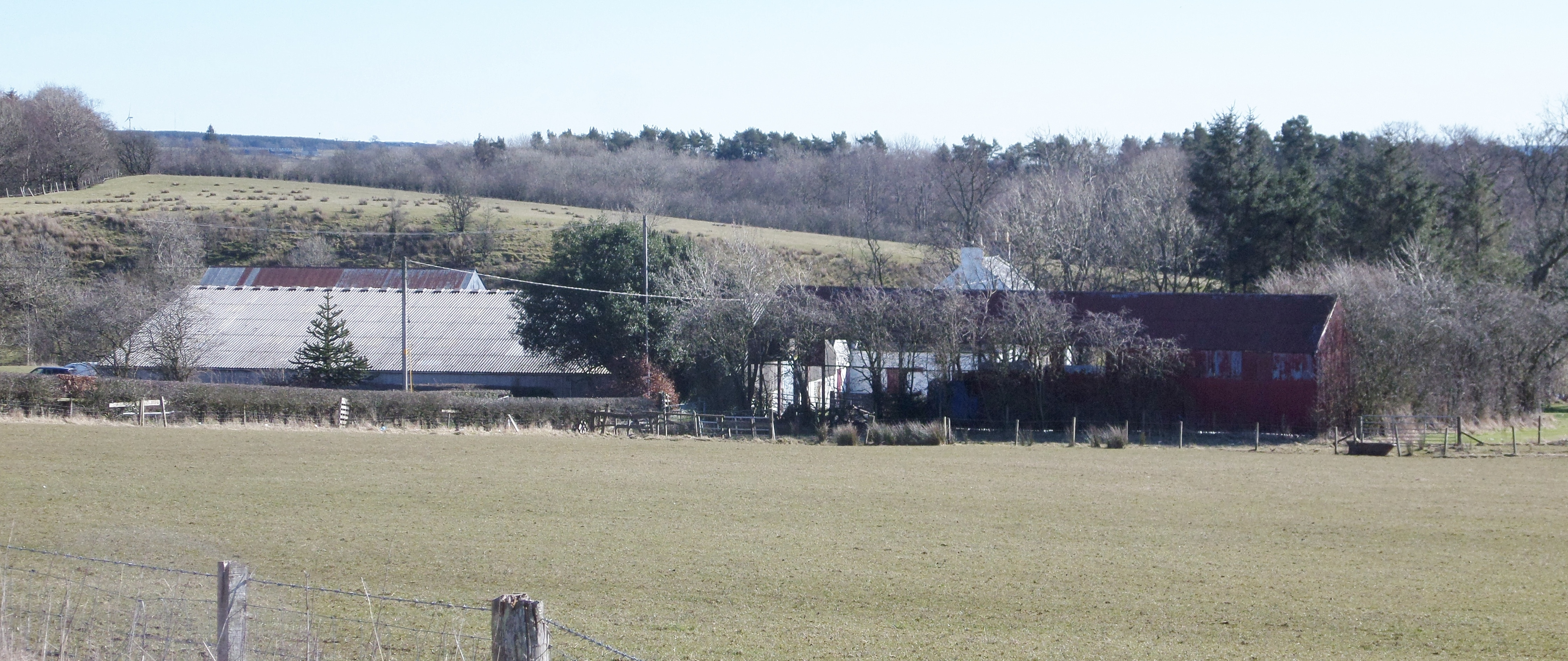
- Dalmusternock Farm

Site information
- Owner: Private
- Controlled by: Mure family
- Open to the public: No
- Condition: Occupied

Location
- Shown within East Ayrshire
- Location within East Ayrshire
- Coordinates: 55.6441°N 4.4554°W

Site history
- Built: 17th century
- Built by: Mures
- In use: Remodelled in the 19th century
- Materials: stone

Dalmusternock (NS455417) was a dower house built and occupied by William Mure after his marriage and prior to inheriting the family seat of Rowallan Castle. The property is located near Fenwick, in the Barony of Rowallan, lying 3 miles north of Kilmarnock and 18 miles south of Glasgow, Parish of Fenwick, East Ayrshire, Scotland. The estate is recorded as Dalmunsternoch circa 1654; Dalmasternock circa 1747; Dalmusterknok 1775

== History ==
=== The Lands of Dalmusternock ===
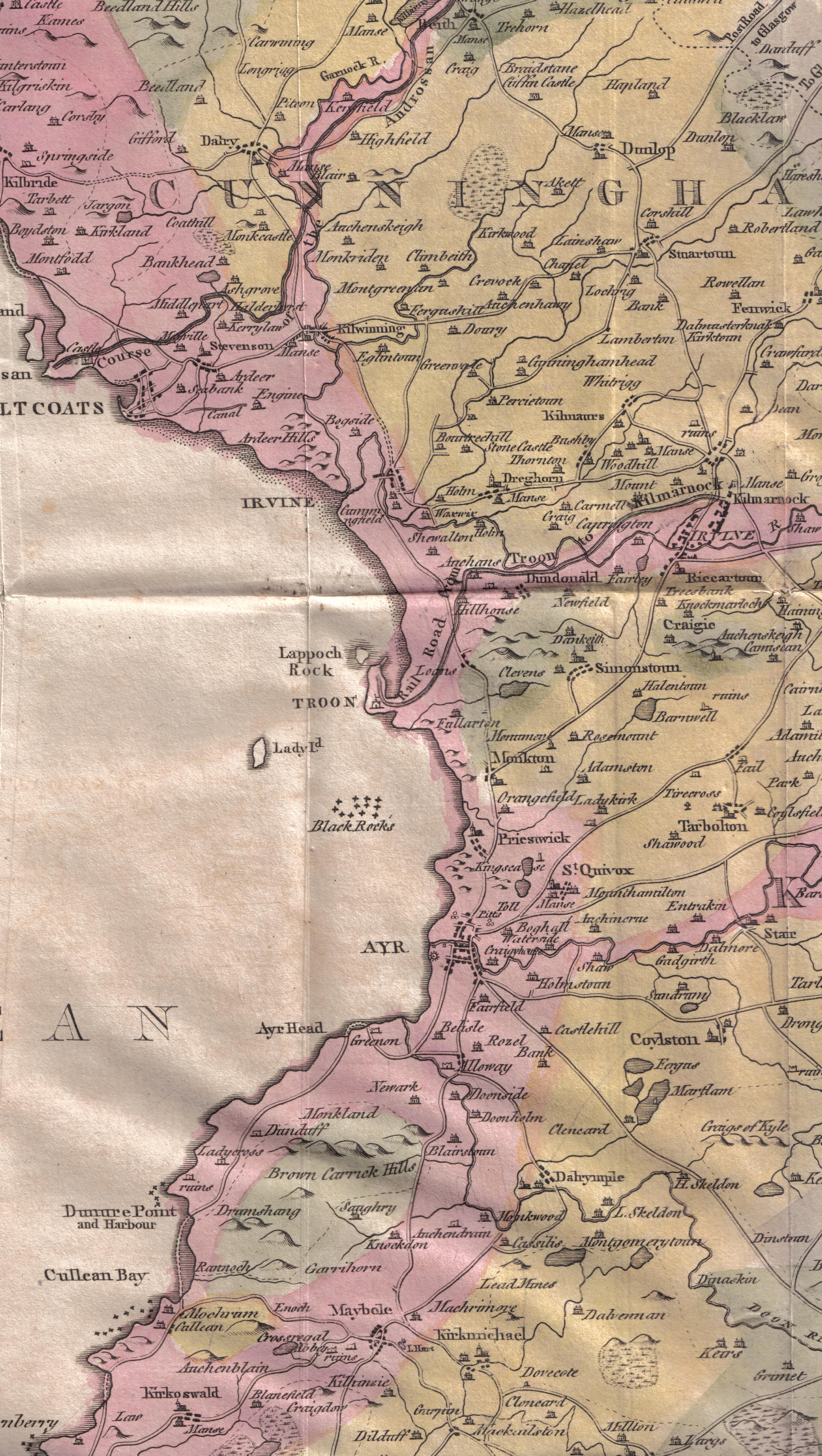
William Aiton's map of 1811 showing Dalmusternock and Rowallan.

In 1615 the poet Sir William Mure of Rowallan Castle married Anna Dundas, the daughter of the laird of Newliston, an estate located near Edinburgh. William was the son of Elizabeth Montgomerie, sister of the well known poet Alexander Montgomerie of Hessilhead Castle near Beith. In 1643 William Mure was a member of the Scottish parliament through which the Solemn League and Covenant was ratified with England and took part in the English campaign of 1644. He fought and was wounded at the Battle of Marston Moor, shortly after commanding a regiment at Newcastle.

As a first home or dower house he built Dalmusternock in 1615 for although he was the eldest son he had not as yet inherited the family properties and would not do so until 1639. Dalmusternock is in an attractive location on the Fenwick Water within easy reach of the family seat at Rowallan Castle. The coat of arms of Sir William and his wife are still located above the entrance door. The 1615 date of his marriage is carved on a stone to the right of the doorway with the initials A. D. for his wife Anna Dundas on a stone to the left.

Five sons and six daughters came of this first marriage, namely William who succeeded, Captain Allexander who was killed fighting rebels in Ireland, Major Robert who married Lady Newhall in Fife, John of Fenwickhill and Patrick, who in 1662 was created a baronet of Nova Scotia. Only one daughter, Elizabeth, reached maturity and married Uchter Knox, Laird of Ranfurly. His first wife Anna died comparatively young and Sir William then married Dame Jane Hamilton, Lady Duntreth, having two sons, James and Hugh and two daughters, Jeane and Marion from this union.

In 1616 his father inherited the family estates and in 1639 he in turn inherited at which point he moved to Rowallan Castle and Dalmusternock remained as a small dower house before its final transition to a farmhouse.

Dobie records that it was the property of the Marquis of Hastings and by 1874 it was part of the Barony of Rowallan then held by the Earl of Loudoun. As stated it was used as a dower house by the Mures of nearby Rowallan Castle although it is not recorded as to which members of the family lived there. Three heraldic panels are inserted, one with a date of 1671. It was remodelled as a farmhouse in the 19th century.

A watermill of some sort was located at Dalmusternock in the 19th century as indicated by the lade, sluice and mill pond shown on OS maps of the time. Hugh Robertson was farming 129 acres at Dalmusternock in 1851 showing that the dower house had been remodelled by this time.

=== Bessie Dunlop of the Lynn ===
Bessie Dunlop of Lynn near Dalry recalled at her trial for witchcraft that a meeting with her 'familiar' Thomas Reid at a place known as the 'Thorn of Dawmstarnik.' This was probably Dalmusternock as it lies on the Stranraer to Glasgow road via Kilmarnock that would have been a busy thoroughfare which Bessie might well have used. Thomas offered her great rewards if she would deny her Christian faith however Bessie refused and Thomas was very displeased however she said that she would take his advice on lesser matters. Bessie Dunlop was burned at the stake in Edinburgh as a witch in 1576.

== Cartographic evidence ==
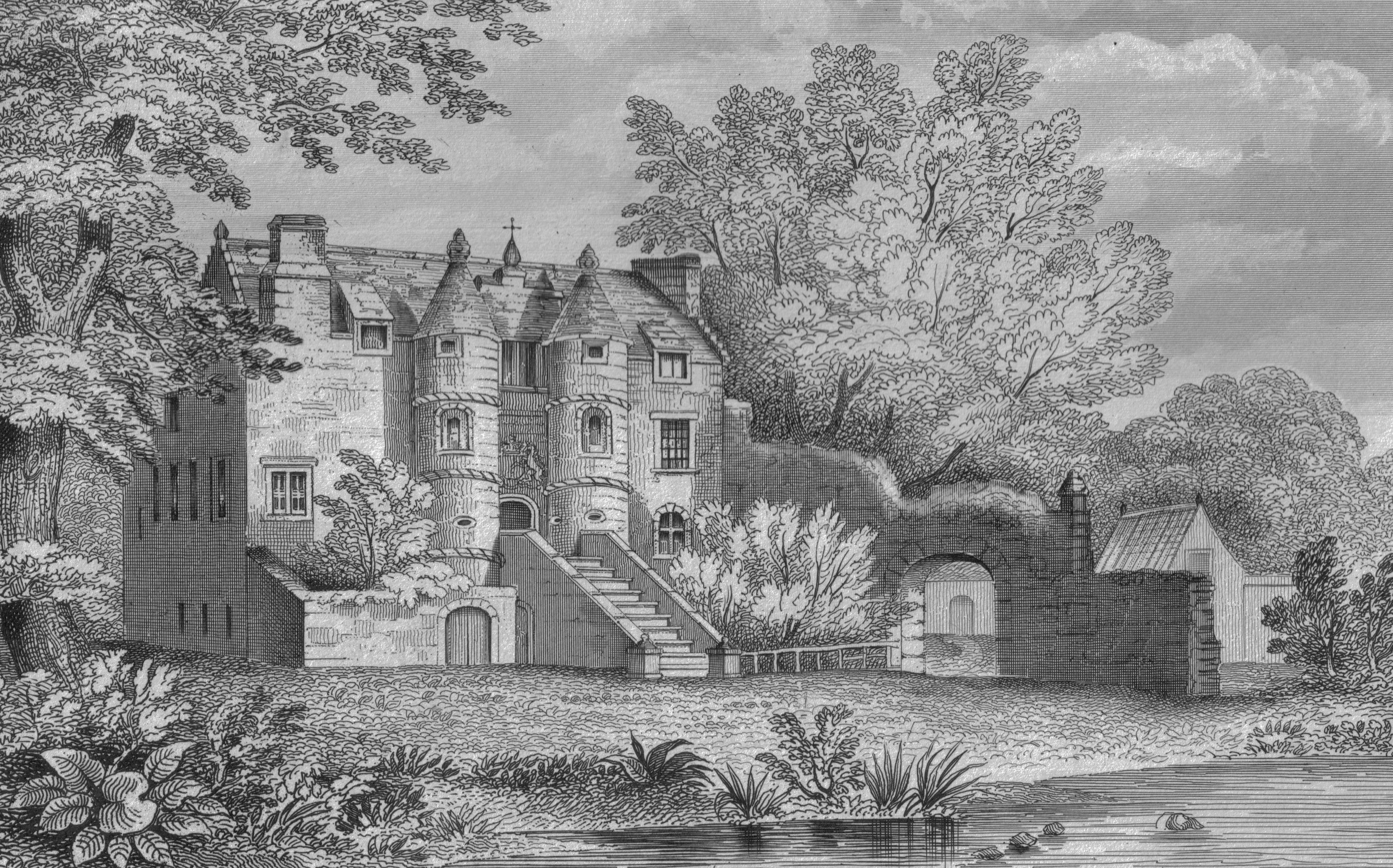
The old Rowallan Castle in 1876.

Pont's map of circa 1600 shows a small wooded estate surrounded by a fence or pale. Moll's 1725 map shows the Glasgow to Stranraer road running close to Dalmusternock. Roys map of 1747 shows Dalmasternock (sic) lying close to the Glasgow to Stranraer Road and a dwelling known as 'Stepends' which may relate to stepping stones across the Mathernock (later Fenwick) Water. The 1856 OS map shows a long lade running upstream and a sluice that suggests a waterwheel. The 1895 OS records a mill pond in addition to the other noted features.

== Micro-history ==
In 1684 John Kirkland and Thomas Rainie are listed as Covenanters on the fugitives roll as living at Dalmusterlock.

James Miller, son to Mathew Miller and Mary Smith of Dalmusternock was buried in Fenwick cemetery on Tuesday, 1 August 1749. Sara Steill of Dalmusternock was buried on Monday, June 24, 1723.

In March 1851 Hugh Robertson, aged 36, was farming 129 acres at Dalmusternock.

Dalmusternock is a Category B Listed Building.

== See also ==
- Bessie Dunlop of Lynn
- Rowallan Castle
- Polkelly Castle
