= Semaška =

- Lithuanian surname
- m.: Semaška
- f.: (unmarried): Semaškaitė
- f.: (married): Semaškienė
- Related names: Semashko Simashko

Semaška is a Lithuanian-language surname. Variant: Simaška Notable people with the surname include:

- Darius Semaška (born 1967), Lithuanian diplomat and statesman
- Jonas Semaška (1907–1947), Lithuanian officer and Lithuanian independence resistance fighter
