= Tunnels in popular culture =

Appearance of tunnels in media

The Lugton Water and Eglinton Castle in Scotland. A "vowt", passing under two rivers, is said to link the castle with Kilwinning Abbey.

Mysterious tunnels or "secret passages" are a common element of the local folklore tradition in Europe. Such tunnels are said to physically link prominent places such as country houses, castles, churches, ancient monuments and other, often medieval, buildings.

Legends about the existence of secret tunnels usually involve improbably long subterranean passages, sometimes running under major obstacles such as rivers and lakes to reach their destinations. Religious buildings, monks and the landed gentry are particularly common elements in many tunnel stories.

It is unlikely that many of the recorded tunnels exist physically, for this is a characteristic of their very nature; their significance lies in the number of similar legends of tunnels that have arisen and in connection with the more esoteric notions of channels or paths of earth energy, and such.

== The origins of secret passage myths ==
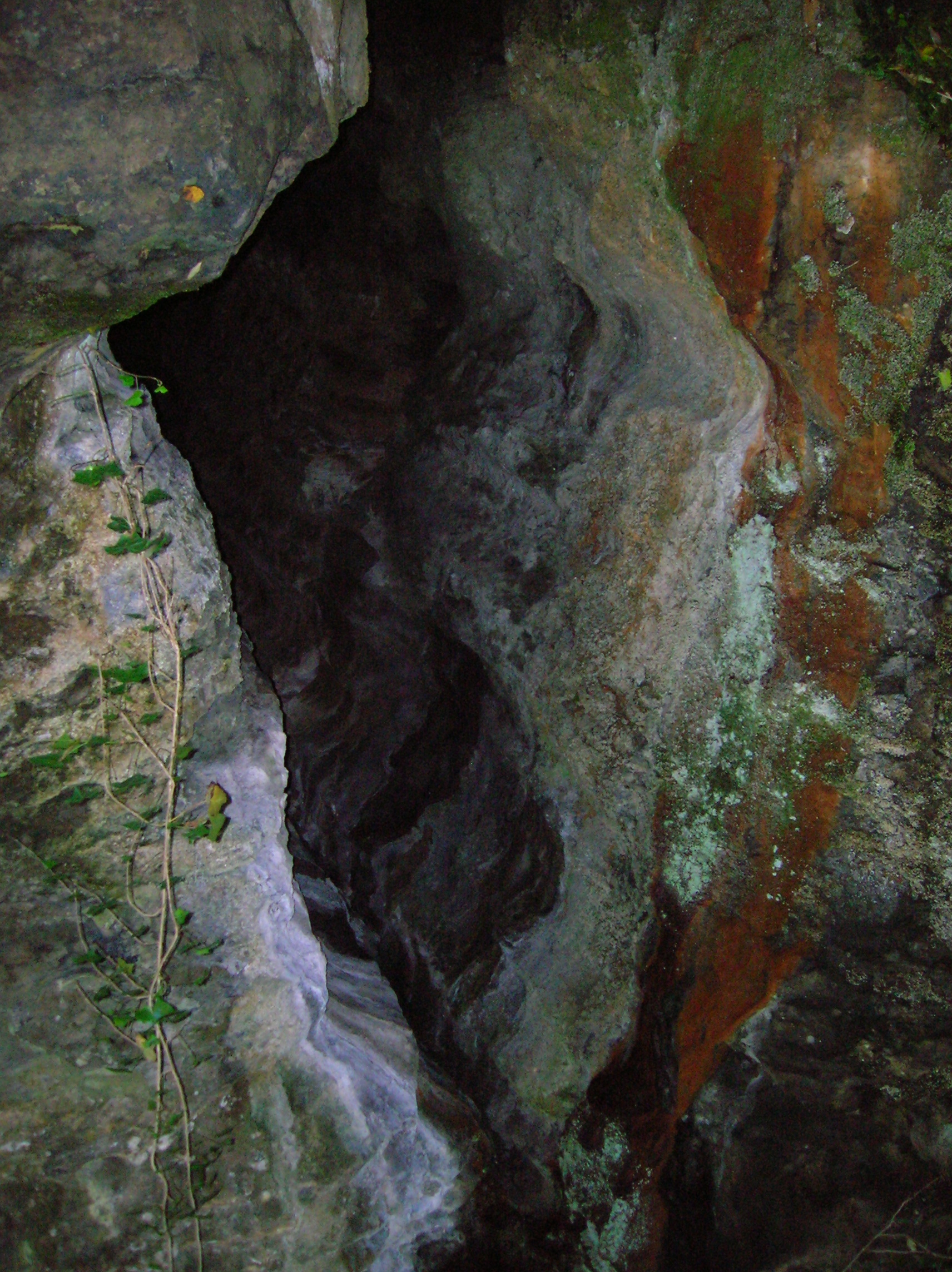
One of the entrances to the Cleeves Cove cave system in Scotland, known as the Elfhame

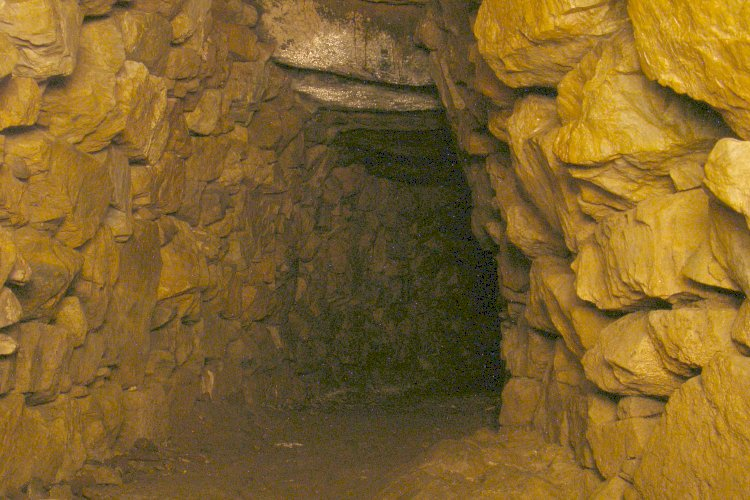
Inside the main chamber of Halliggye Fogou, Trelowarren, Cornwall

Underground structures have a fascination due to their being hidden from view and their contents, purpose, extent and destinations remaining unknown. Over the centuries many underground structures have been discovered by chance, ranging from Cornish fogous, souterrains that are possibly Pictish, Roman and medieval sewers to smuggling tunnels, escape tunnels, siege tunnels, and the like.

On occasion, possible tunnels prove to be of purely natural origin, such as at Cleeves Cove cave in Scotland, or Kents Cavern in England. The site at Cleeves Cove cave was previously known as the 'Elfhouse' or 'Elfhame', the locals at that time believing that elves had made it their abode.

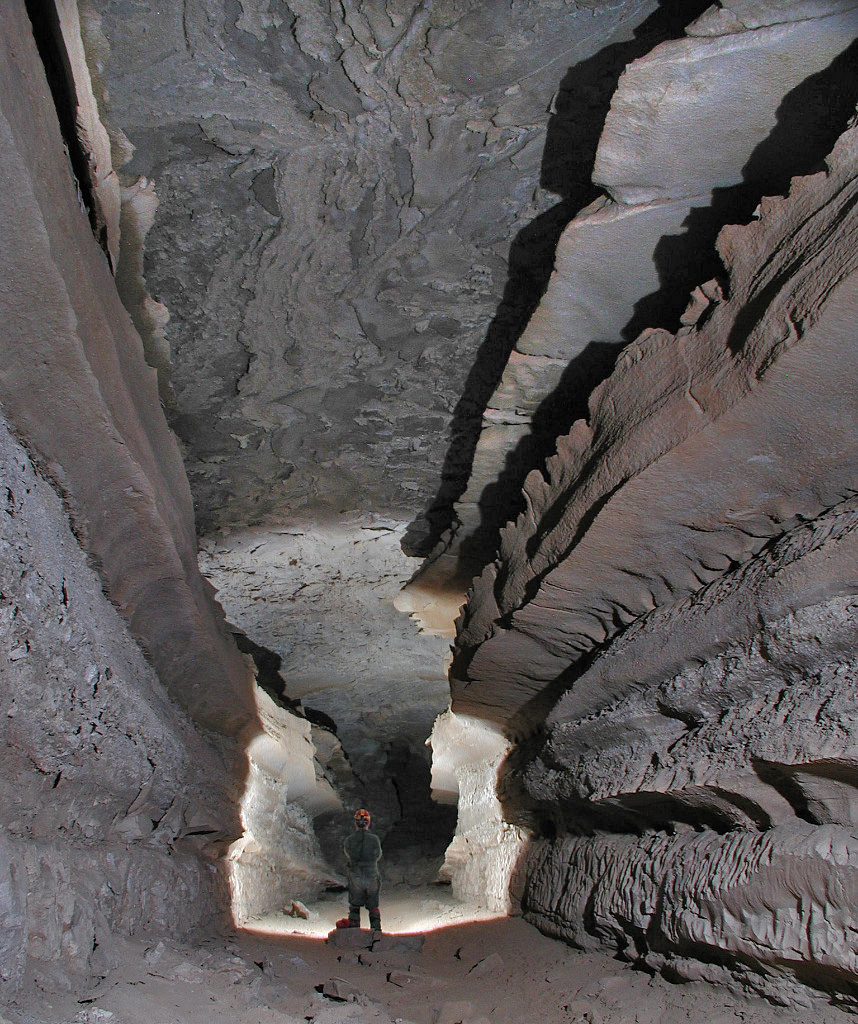
Canyon passage in Mammoth Cave, the world's longest cave

Rarely, natural caves or tunnel systems can be of great extent; the cave system with the greatest total length of passage is Mammoth Cave (Kentucky, USA) at 591 kilometers (367 mi) in length, whilst the next most extensive known cave is Jewel Cave near Custer, South Dakota, USA, at 225 kilometers (140 mi).

Some castles really did have escape tunnels, such as possibly the short passage located at Loudoun Castle in East Ayrshire, Scotland, which leads from the old kitchens to a 'tunnel-like' bridge over the Hag Burn; this may however have been a drain of some kind. Other examples were longer: the young king Edward III was imprisoned by Roger de Mortimer, 1st Earl of March at Nottingham Castle, and in 1330 a small group of armed supporters of Edward III made use of a long, winding secret passage which led directly into the castle, allowing them to surprise and capture Mortimer.

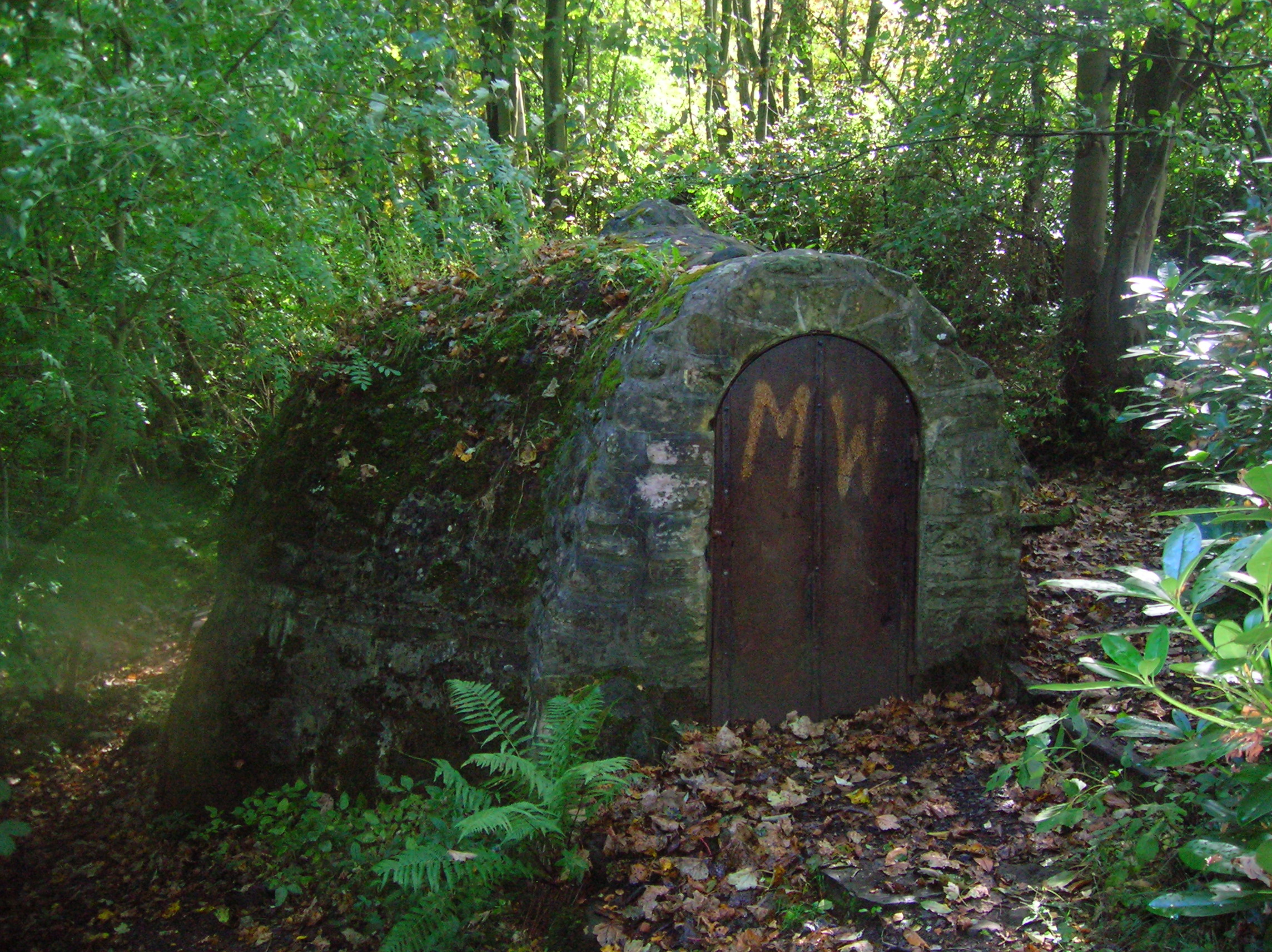
The ice house entrance, Eglinton Country Park

Other tunnels are products of an excessive desire for personal privacy, such as at Welbeck Abbey and Brownlow Castle. Another tunnel allowed for the supposed free and secret movement of monks, abbots and other ecclesiastics who may have had cause to keep a low profile for fear of attack or abusive treatment during periods of unrest or persecution. Smugglers at times avoided the excise man by making use of drains, sewers or water supply conduits, although in a few cases they seem to have constructed tunnels for the purpose of smuggling.

Bruce Walker, an expert on Scottish vernacular architecture, has suggested that the relatively numerous and usually long-ruined ice houses on country estates may have led to Scotland's many tunnel legends. The appearance of ice house entrance could have prompted the uninitiated to make such deductions since ice houses are often inconspicuously located in such places as ha-ha walls, house and stable basements, woodland banks, and open fields.

Many legends are associated with the actual and supposed activities of the Knights Templar and they are rich in stories about tunnels connecting the various properties that the order possessed up to the 12th century, when it was suppressed.

Sigmund Freud, Carl Jung and others had various psychological interpretations of the symbolic meanings of tunnels and these may have a part to play in the origins of tunnel myths.

== Examples ==
=== Denmark ===
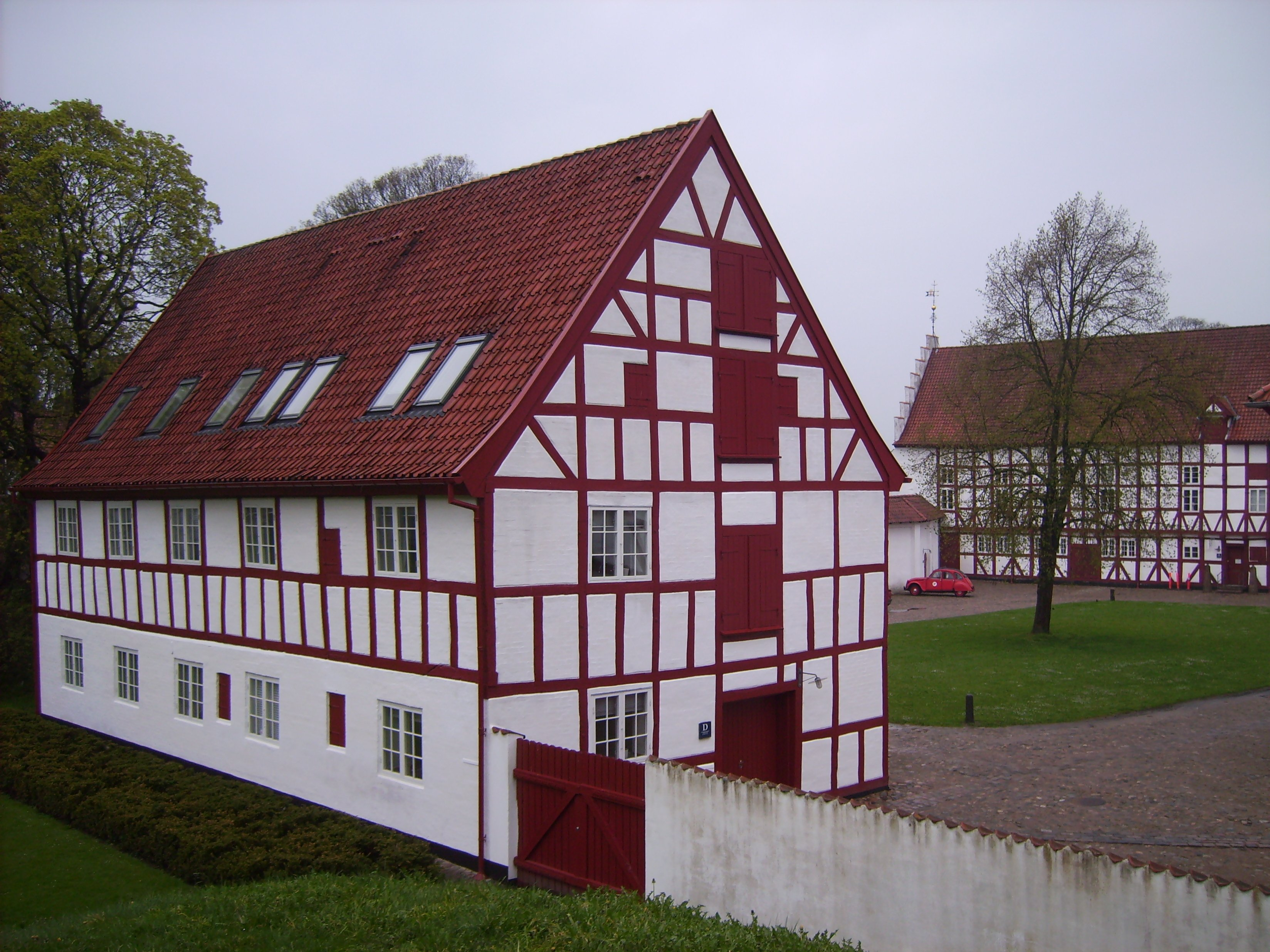
Aalborghus castle

In the city of Aalborg, a tunnel is said to have run from the convent under the fjord to another convent near Sundby. This tunnel had branches which ran to an old bridge, two churches and to the castle of Aalborghus. A student once tried to explore the tunnels with a long cord, a sword and a light. The broken cord was retrieved, but the student was never seen again.

=== England ===
At Furness Abbey a tunnel has been said to run underneath the Abbey to both Piel Castle and Dalton Castle. This was said to be how the monks travelled between each monument to receive foodstuffs and keep watch over the towns. It has also been rumoured that the Holy Grail and King John's missing jewels are hidden somewhere inside it.

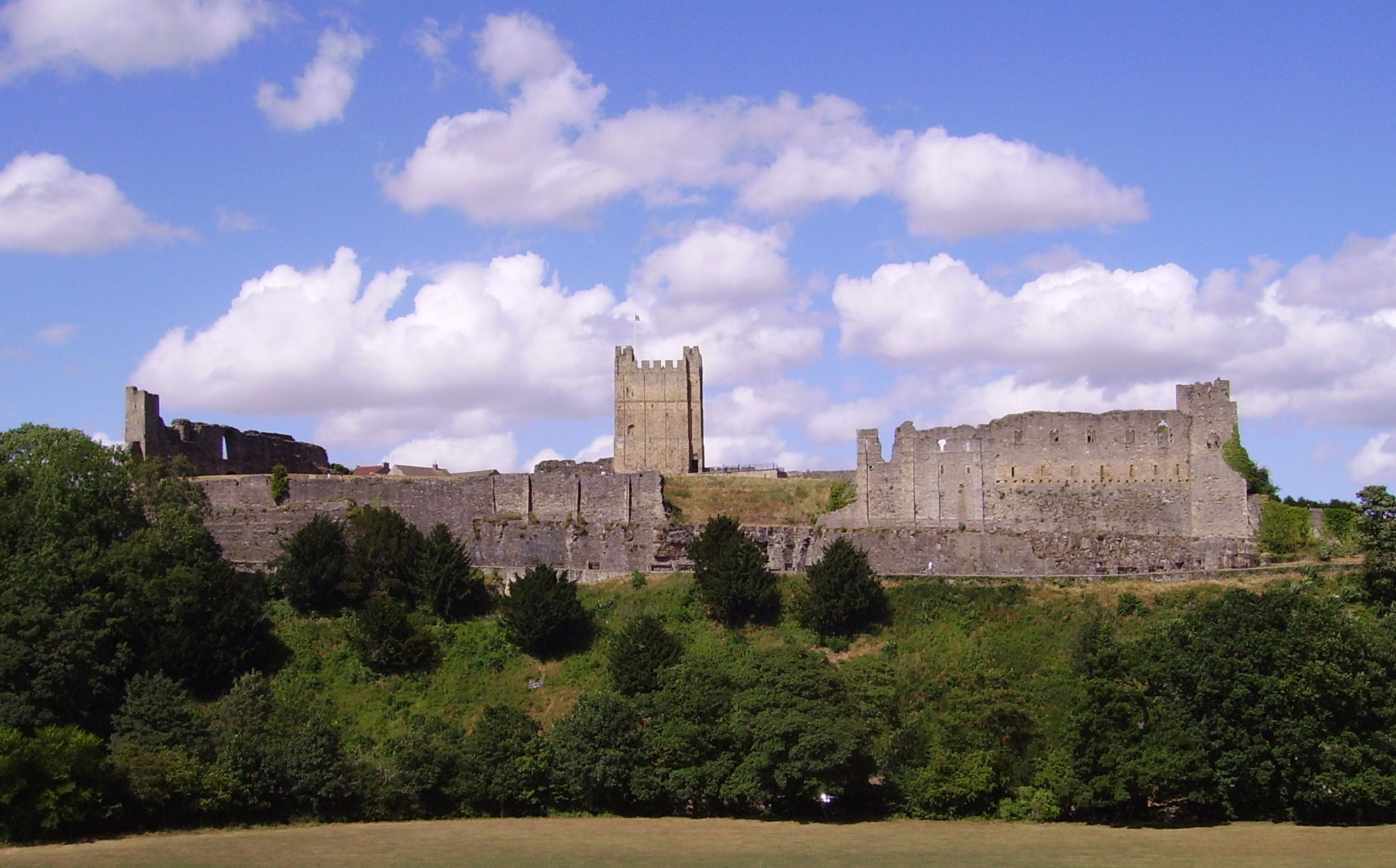
Richmond Castle

Richmond Castle in North Yorkshire stands in a cliff-top position overlooking the River Swale. A potter named Thompson is said to have discovered a tunnel entrance at the bottom of this cliff. Following it deep into the hillside, he came to a large cavern where slept King Arthur and his knights around the famous Round Table. On the table lay an ancient horn and a mighty sword. Thompson reached out and picked up the horn, but the sleepers began to awake and, fearing for his life, the potter fled. As he raced down the tunnel back to daylight and safety, he heard a voice behind him declare:

"Potter Thompson, Potter Thompson!
If thou hadst drawn the sword or blown the horn,
Thou hadst been the luckiest man e'er was born."

The tunnel appears to have been well known, though the cave remains hidden. A second story tells how this subterranean passage is supposed to run from the Castle to nearby Easby Abbey. Some soldiers once sent a drummer-boy along it to test the theory and followed the sound of his drum almost halfway to the Abbey. The drumming suddenly stopped and the boy was never seen again, but his ghost is said to haunt the tunnel, from where a slow drumbeat is still sometimes heard. A memorial stone marks the spot at which the drum beat was last heard. It is believed that the legendary tunnel was constructed in medieval times as an escape route to the castle for the abbot and canons of the abbey in case of an attack from the Scots, who were continually making raids into the northern counties of England.

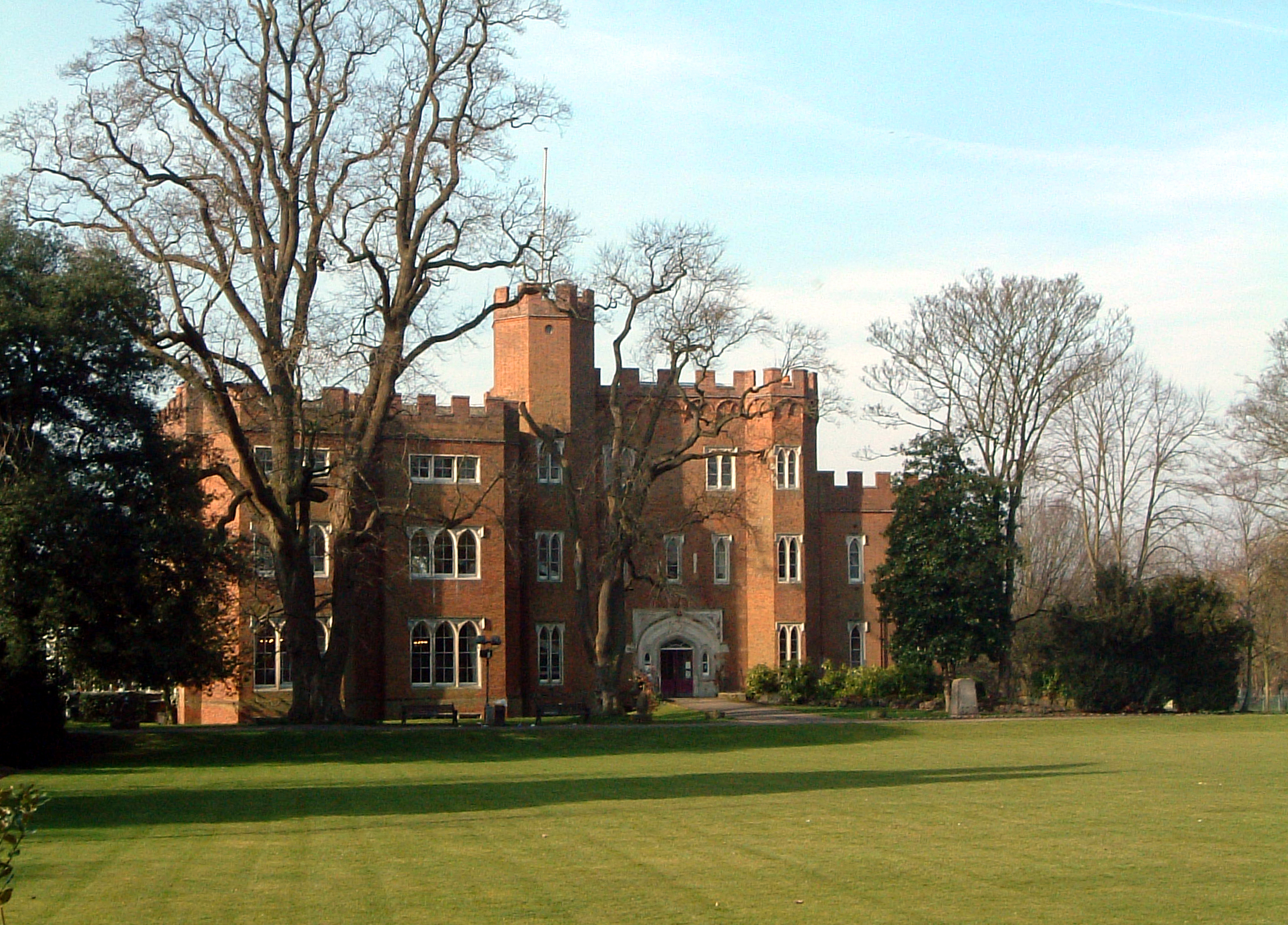
Hertford Castle

A smugglers' tunnel is said to run from Smugglers' Farm in Herstmonceux, Sussex to the Pevensey Marshes, a good distance away. A whole network of secret Knights Templar tunnels is said to run beneath Hertford Castle, running to Dinsley and other local places.

A 'secret tunnel' exists at Pevensey Castle in East Sussex, although not open for public access. It links the keep with the former market square and is thought to be Norman in origin; it was reused during the Second World War.

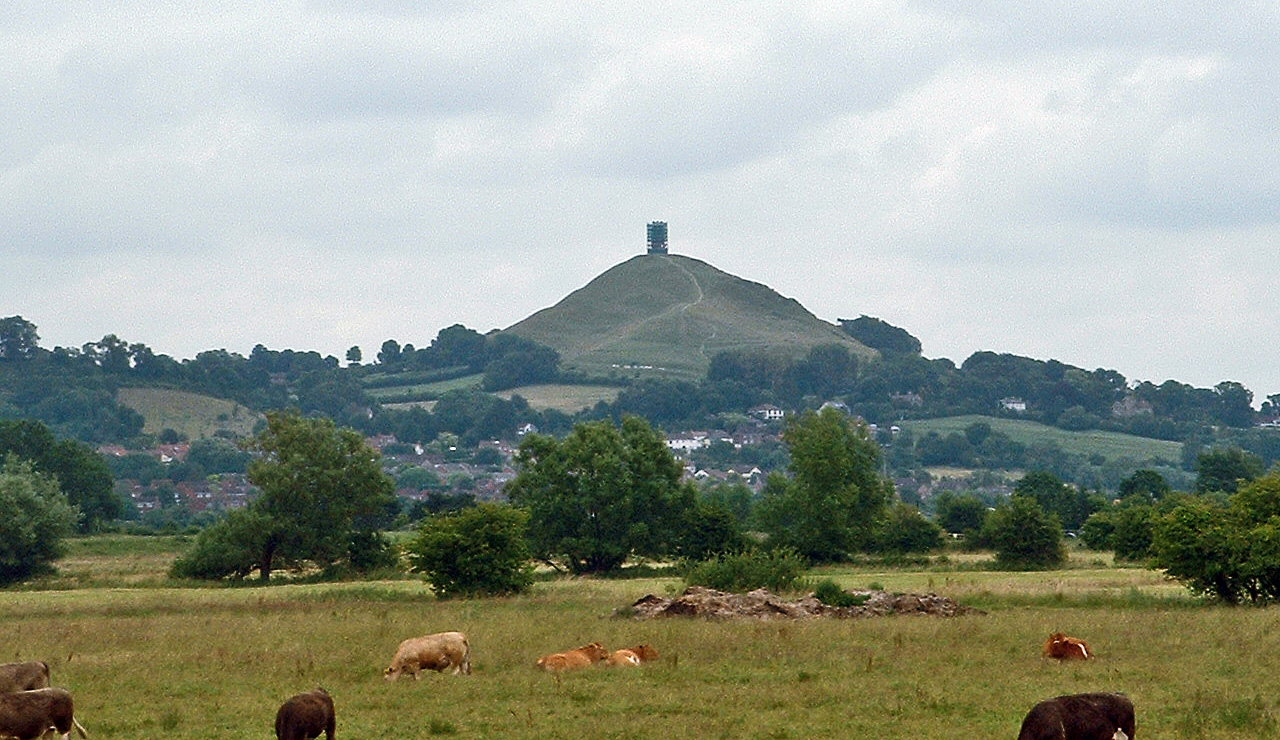
Glastonbury Tor

A series of tunnels are said to lie beneath Glastonbury Tor. The most famous tale is about a tunnel from Glastonbury Abbey to the Tor. At one time some thirty monks were rumoured to have entered the Tor via this tunnel, but only three came out again, and two of them were insane and one was struck dumb. Another widely believed legend is that of a long-distance tunnel leading from the crypt of the Lady (or Galilee) Chapel, under the River Brue to a distant point, possibly to the village of Street, where a passage exists from an outlying building in the grounds of the old manor house. A dog is said to have been put into the tunnel at Street and found his way out at the Glastonbury end.

A tunnel is said to run from King's College Chapel to Granchester Manor, Cambridge, passing under the river Cam.

A tunnel is said to run from Newbury Town Hall to St Nicolas Church. This belief may have started because there are east-west flowing brick Victorian service tunnels running from roughly the Newbury arcade towards this church; these were exposed to the public's gaze during construction work. A tunnel is also said to run from Newbury Castle (400 ft above sea level) and Shaw House (260 ft, thus 140 ft below it). The point of entry is said to be a hollow space (now blocked) in the south-east angle of the enclosure. In 1930 workmen investigated the legend by excavating the entrance, but found nothing.

At Necton in East Anglia a tunnel is said to run from the restored 14th-century church of All Saints to Necton Hall, in possession of the Mason family since the time of Henry VII.

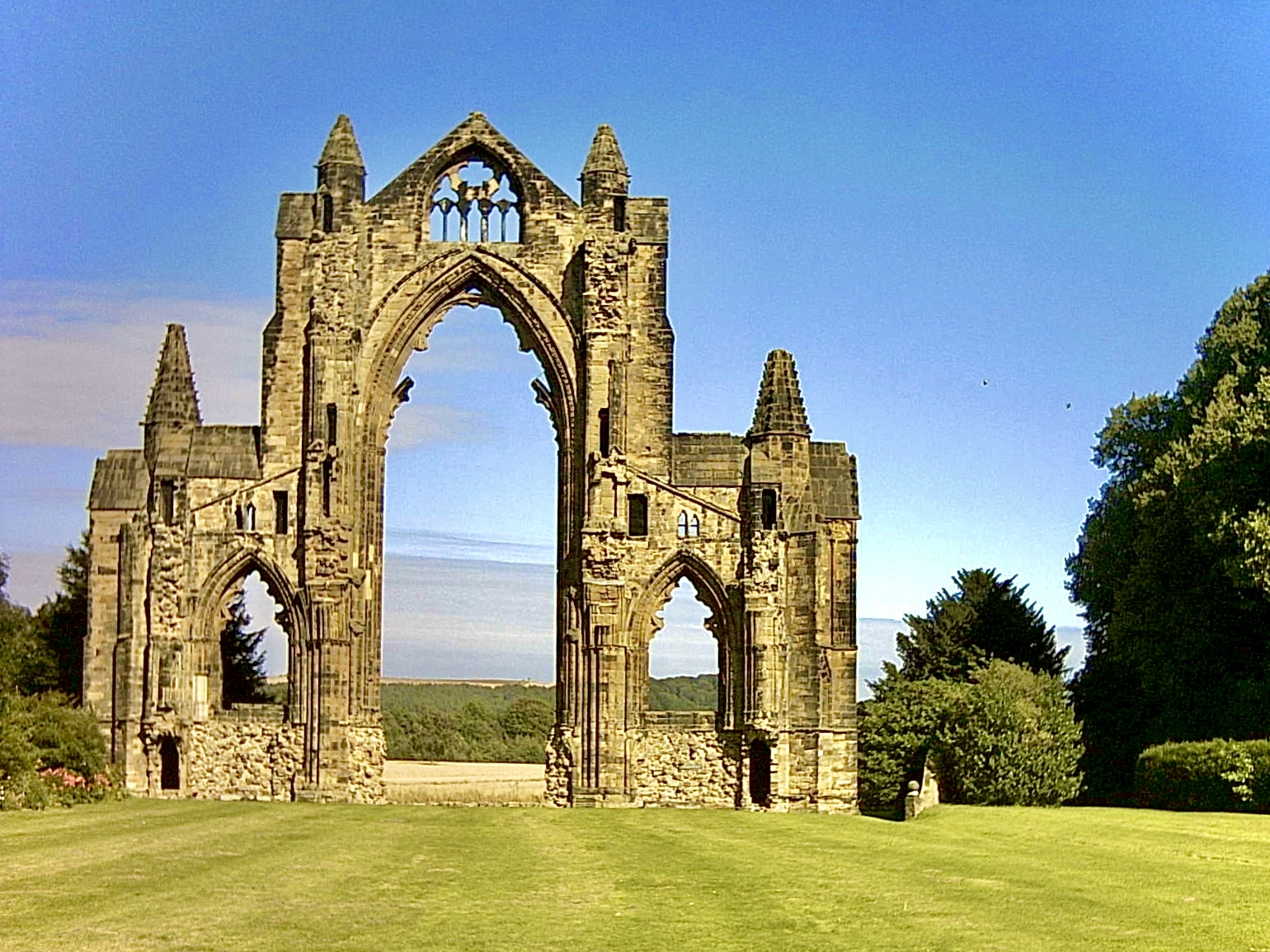
Gisborough Priory

The first of a number of legendary tunnels under Norwich leads from the Castle (TM232085) to the Guildhall (TM231085) near the market-place, erected 1407-13 on the site of the old tollhouse. It still has a 14th-century vault below it that was the crypt (and prison) of the former building. A second tunnel (in which a pig was once lost) heads from the Castle for Carrow Priory (TM242073 area), a Benedictine nunnery whose scant 12th century remains on the outskirts of Norwich are incorporated into a residence of the Colman family, near the junction of King Street and Bracondale. The third tunnel from the Castle ran to the Norman cathedral to the north-east (TM235089), begun in 1096 by Bishop Herbert de Losinga and finally consecrated in 1101-2. Yet another subterranean way links the Castle with the Crown Derby near the Guildhall.

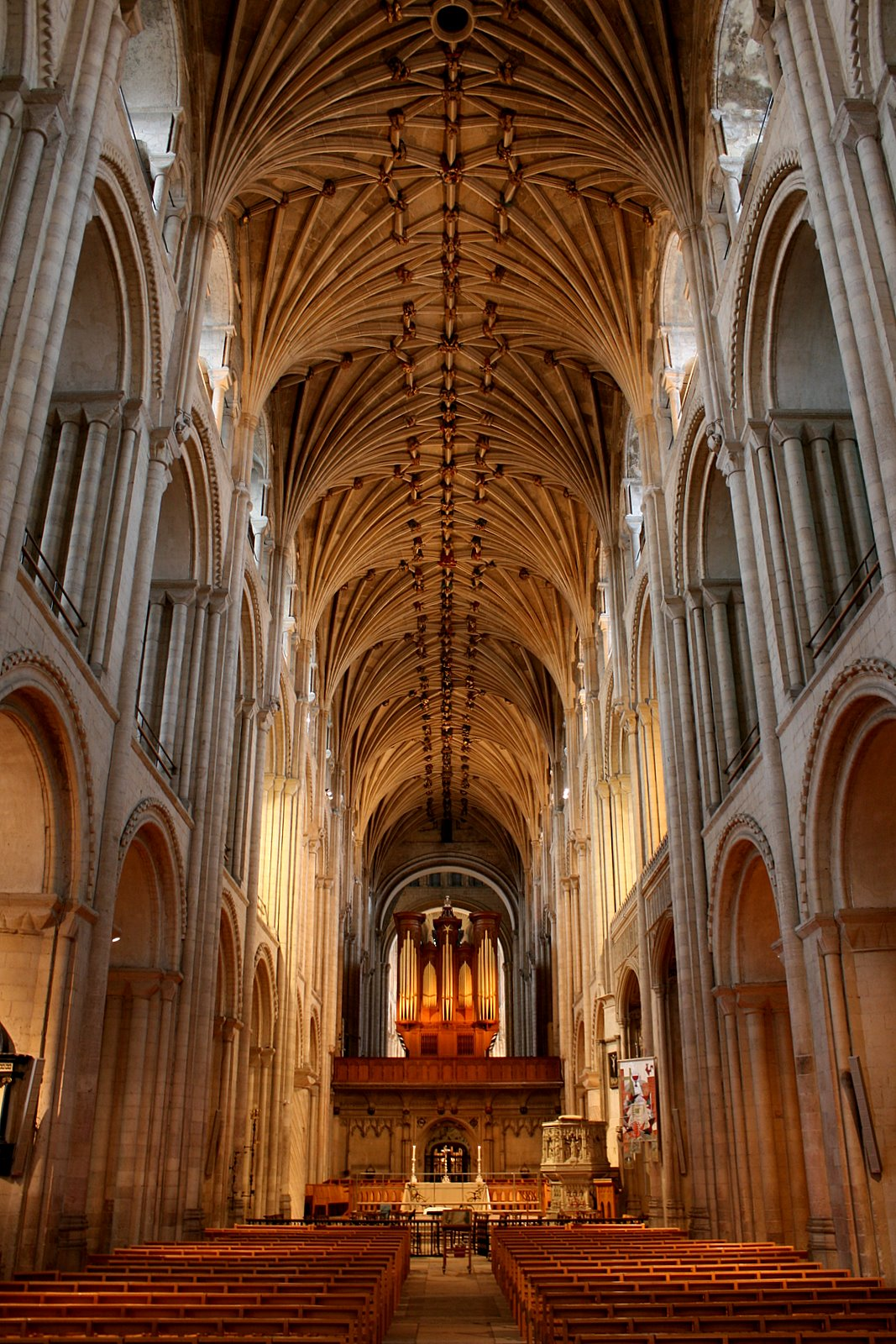
The interior of Norwich Cathedral - the Nave

At Norwich Cathedral another tunnel begins, running for about nine miles to the ruins of St Benet's Abbey (TG383157) on the marshes at Ludham. A much shorter one, allegedly used by monks, was said to run from the cathedral to Samson & Hercules House. The Anglia Restaurant in Prince's Street has a splendid groined crypt for a cellar, and two tunnels from here are said to lead to the cathedral and to St. Andrew's Hall. Monks supposedly used a tunnel from the cellars of the Shrub House at the corner of Charing Cross Street to the site of St. Benedict's Gates.

In early January 1644, Cromwell sent his forces to Norwich to demand the surrender of a small group of Royalists, whom he heard to be present at the Maid's Head Hotel. According to legend, as the Parliamentarians entered the hotel, the Royalists retreated through a secret tunnel, stretching steel ropes across the way behind them. Many of Cromwell's men (and their horses) were beheaded as they raced through the tunnel in pursuit, and this incident is used to explain the sound of ghostly hoofbeats often heard emanating from under the ground around the Cathedral Close.

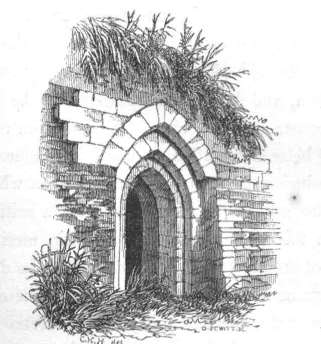
A postern at Northampton Castle

One smugglers' tunnel was rumoured to run from Kinson, now a Bournemouth suburb, to the coast some four miles away.

In the 19th century, it was said that an underground passage ran from the remains of the 12th century Gisborough Priory, immediately south of Guisborough parish church, to a field that lay in the parish of Tocketts. Halfway along was said to be a chest of gold guarded by a raven or crow. In Redcar and Cleveland almost every old castle and ruined monastery has its legend of a subterranean passage leading therefrom, which someone has penetrated to a certain distance, and has seen an iron chest, supposed to be full of gold, on which was perched a raven. The raven may suggest a Scandinavian origin of the legends.

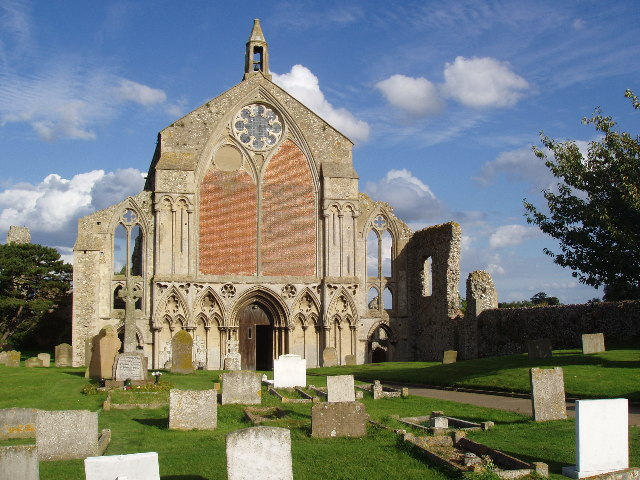
Binham Priory

Bracknell's Old Manor is a sturdy 17th century brick manor house having a priest hole and is said to have secret passages connecting to the exterior.

Droitwich Spa is said to have a passageway that leads from St Augustine's church, Dodderhill, to Friar Street in the town centre. A system of tunnels is said to run from there to St Augustine's and St Andrew's churches.

The story that Thomas Becket fled from Northampton Castle is a well documented part of 12th century history, but how the persecuted Archbishop of Canterbury managed to flee from the fortress remains a mystery. One myth is that he fled from the clutches of Henry II through a tunnel that linked the castle to All Saints Church in Mercers Row.

At Binham Priory in Norfolk a fiddler entered the tunnel which ran beneath the building and could be heard for some distance before all sound of him suddenly ceased. The fiddler was never seen again.

The rhyme below dates from the 17th century and recalls the tradition that a tunnel connects what is now Syon House with the friary of Sheen at Richmond in Surrey, a considerable distance away.

"The Nun of Sion, with the Friar of Shean,
Went under water to play the Quean."

The origin of the legend remains a mystery.

In Leicestershire a subterranean passage is said to connect a nunnery which once stood near the Humber Stone with Leicester Abbey. In the cellars under Leicester Castle a witch known as 'Black' or 'Cat Anna' is said to have lived. She is said to have journeyed to the Dane Hills through an underground passage.

=== Ireland ===
In Lurgan a tunnel supposedly went from Brownlow House to the local police station, the courthouse and to the church in the middle of the town. Another tunnel was from Soyes Mill to Lurgan Castle. One explanation for the Brownlow tunnel was that Lord Brownlow had a very over protective wife, and after many years of a good marriage, things went sour, so Brownlow had this tunnel dug so he would be able to exit the castle after dark without his wife's finding out. Once out, he would go on the hunt for some Lurgan lassies, book a room at the Ashburn Hotel, then leave early in the morning to get back in time for breakfast at the castle with his wife. Lakafinna, to the South of Bullaun, has a castle and local folklore relates that a tunnel exists between this castle and the village of Ballyara.

=== Scotland ===
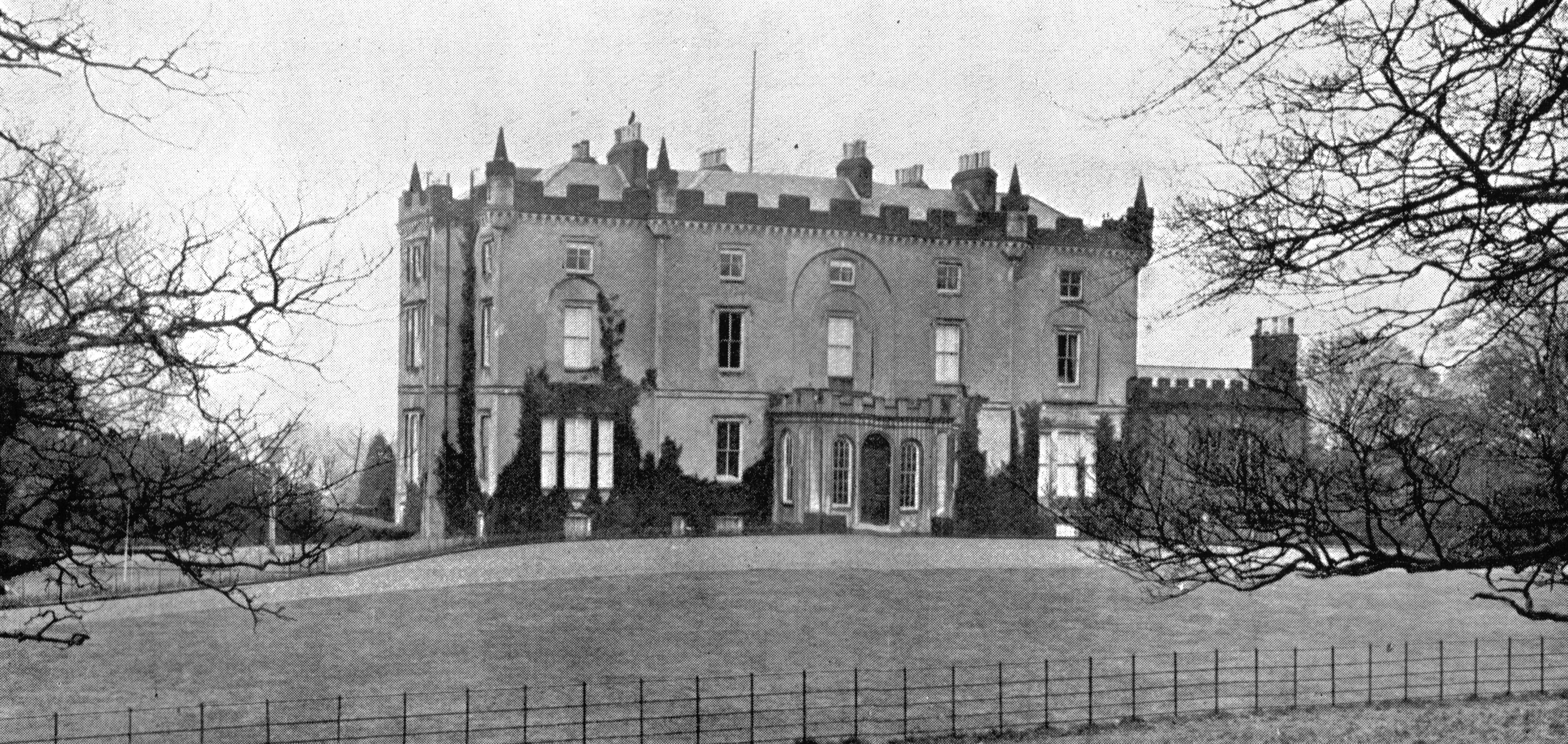
Caldwell House circa 1910

Blackness Castle in Lothian is said to have a tunnel linking it with the House of Binns, about three kilometres distant. A tunnel is said to run from Stanecastle near Irvine to Eglinton Castle and another from Stanecastle to Seagate Castle in Irvine, complete with a mythical piper. Monkredding was a property of Kilwinning Abbey and a tunnel is said to link the two properties. Another tunnel is said to run from Stanecastle to Dundonald. A subterranean passage was found by workmen at Stanecastle in the 19th century.

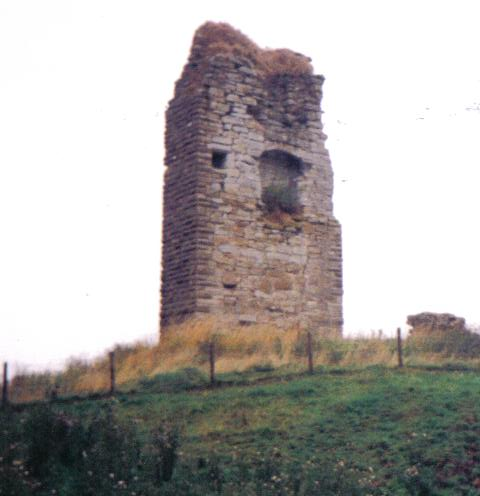
Ravenscraig Castle in Scotland

A tunnel is said to run from near Ravenscraig Castle down to the Annick Water just up stream of Lainshaw Castle. The tunnel was reportedly crawled through by the grandfather of a local man and may be related to the drainage of the nearby, now flooded, Hillhouse quarry, the Water Plantation area, and other Lainshaw estate lands.

A tunnel is said to run from Loudoun Castle under the River Irvine to Cessnock Castle in Galston, East Ayrshire, Scotland.

Culzean Castle in South Ayrshire was built on top of a cave system, the castle's previous name was 'Cove', Scots for cave. The Marquess of Ailsa sent his piper into the cave and he was never seen again however, according to the legend, the sound of bagpipes can still be heard at the piper's brae that lies above the caverns.

A tunnel is said to run from the old Giffen Castle near Beith to the now abandoned farm of Bank of Giffen; some years back some children are said to have found and made their way safely through the tunnel.

Cleeves Cove cave, the site of the Elfhame, is said to be connected to Loudoun Hill. It is reported that once the Laird of Auchenskeich's collie dog entered the cave at its entrance above the Dusk Water and came out at Loudoun Hill near Darvel, many miles away. The end of the Cleeves Cove system is said to have never been found. Mauchline Castle is said to be linked to Kingencleugh Castle by a tunnel.

A tunnel is said to run the one and a half miles from Craufurdland Castle to Dean Castle in Kilmarnock, Ayrshire. It was used to provision Dean Castle when it was besieged for several months in the time of Edward I, and the siege was only abandoned when the besieged hung several freshly killed sheep over the wall and offered them to the attackers. The tunnel entrance was only blocked up in the early 19th century. Cuthbertson records the tradition of a tunnel running from Dean Castle down to the Kilmarnock Water near the old Begbie's Tavern of Burn's fame. This tunnel is said to have become a public sewer.

Greenan Castle is said to be linked by a tunnel to St John's Tower at Montgomerieston in Ayr. Stories of it containing skeletons in chains and the entrance being found circulated in the 1950s.

A local tradition was that an underground passage ran from Caldwell House to the old Lugton Inn (now demolished), under the Lugton Water. A search by owners in the cellars did not reveal any signs of a hidden passage.

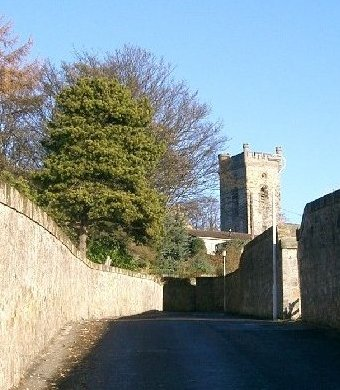
Culross Abbey in Fife

Persistent rumours exist of a tunnel which is said to run from Kilwinning Abbey, under the 'Bean Yaird', below the 'Easter Chaumers' and the 'Leddy firs', and then underneath the River Garnock and on to Eglinton Castle. No evidence exists for it, although it may be related to the underground burial vault of the Montgomeries, which does exist under the old abbey, or to the main sewer that would have led from the monastery to the river.

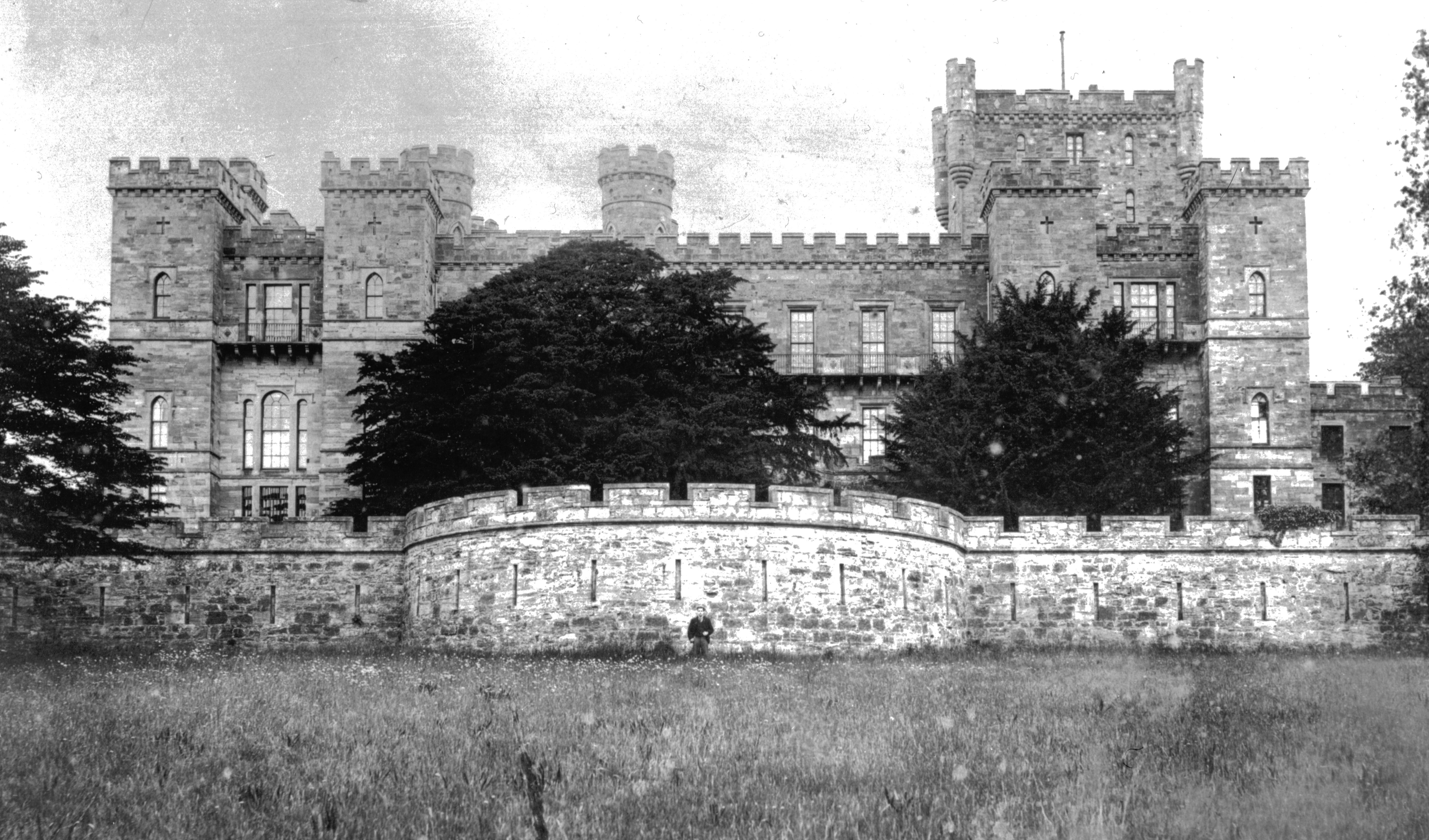
Loudoun Castle, Galston in the 1890s

In the village of Carmunnock near Glasgow a tunnel is said to have connected the parish church with dwellings used by the monks on what is now Busby Road. No sign of the tunnel has yet been found.

A submarine passage is said to run from the Monks' Cave on Little Cumbrae at Stor Hill to Kingarth on the Isle of Bute.

A tunnel was said to have run between James V's Boghouse Castle to the nearby village of Crawfordjohn in South Lanarkshire. King James had built the castle for his mistress the daughter of Carmichael of Crawford.

At Strathaven Castle in South Lanarkshire tunnels are recorded in local tradition as running from the castle to the Sweetie's Brae, Mill Brae, and the Tower. Road works in the 19th century did not reveal anything of their existence.

A tunnel is believed to exist beneath Culross Abbey in Fife and within a man is said to sit on a golden chair waiting to give valuable treasures to anyone who succeeds in finding him. Many years ago a blind piper decided to try and upon entering at Newgate with his dog he proceeded to search and could be heard playing his pipes as far as the West Kirk, three quarters of a mile away. Eventually the dog emerged into the daylight, but the piper was never seen or heard of again. The caves below Keil Point on Isle of Arran contain a slab which may have been an ancient altar. It has the prints of two right feet on it, said to be those of Saint Columba.

In the 19th century some women found the secret tunnel of Coupar Angus Abbey near the entrance to the churchyard. One went in and was never seen again; however, in 1982 a local mason found the entrance again and went in some distance before finding a cave-in. It is said that the tunnel ran a further two and a half miles to a souterrain at Pitcur. Fingask Castle has underground passages, still partly open in 1766, said to run to Kinnaird Castle, two kilometres away.

A ley tunnel is said to run under the River Tay between the hospital of Seggieden and the nunnery at Elcho. Newton Castle in Blairgowrie is said to have a tunnel that runs to Ardblair. Ashintully Castle in Strathardle and Glenshee has a tunnel linking it to its predecessor, Whitefield Castle. In the Weem area, Saint David's Well is said to have a cave beneath it which connects with another cave at Loch Glassie, two kilometres away. At Monzievaird Castle in Strathearn a secret tunnel is said to run from the castle to the Turret Burn.

Near Moniaive in Dumfries and Galloway a tunnel is said to have run from under the Caitloch bridge over the Dalwhat Water to Caitloch House, some distance away. The tunnel is said to have been used by Covenanters evading the king's dragoons during those troubled days and is now blocked.

Brodick Castle on the Isle of Arran had a tunnel which apparently ran down to the shore in Brodick Bay. Circa 1920 the duchess was renovating the castle and had a hollow-sounding section of wall opened up. This work quickly ceased when a story was remembered of two plague victims in the 18th century having been walled up in an old tunnel after they were first covered in quicklime and rubble.

Alexander Gordon in 1726 records that at Ardoch Roman Fort near Dunblane in Perth and Kinross a subterranean passage was said to run from the fort, under the River Tay to the fort or 'Keir' on Grinnin Hill. This tunnel is said to contain a great deal of treasure as recorded in these lines;

From the Camp of Ardoch,
To the Grinnin Hill of Keir,
Are nine Kings rents,
For seven hundred year.

=== Serbia ===
In addition to known real tunnel networks, various legends of tunnels exist as well. According to one, Church of Saint George in Petrovaradin is connected by a tunnel under Danube with Church of Saint John of Nepomuk in Novi Sad. Similarly, Kalemegdan fortress is said to be connected with Zemun.

=== Sweden ===
It is said that a tunnel was constructed between the Holy Cross Priory, Dalby and Lund Cathedral to serve as an escape route for fleeing monks.

=== Ukraine ===
A mysterious tunnel said to run to Kniazh Hill was used during emergencies by the Semashko Princes and other owners of Hubkiv Castle, the powerful princes Danylovych. This tunnel, it is said, starts near the deep well in the castle yard.

=== Wales ===
Local legend states that a tunnel connects the now ruined Court Farm with the nearby church in Pembrey, South Wales.

=== India ===
Local and anecdotal traditions have long circulated in India of ley tunnels between sites such as pilgrimage sites and temples. Reports appear in contemporary newspapers from time to time of mysterious underground tunnels.

== Subterranean passages ==
Tunnels differ from most of the numerous examples of actual secret passages and the like in that they are usually very long. Many examples of extensive underground passages do actually exist, built for a variety of purposes. However, they often lack a link with churches, aristocracy, or some historical event and do not necessarily involve prominent buildings.

An exception is the tunnel that is said to run from the 'bottomless' Saint Michael's Cave in Gibraltar continuing under the Strait of Gibraltar and exiting in Morocco, Africa.

=== Drains, sewers and water supplies ===
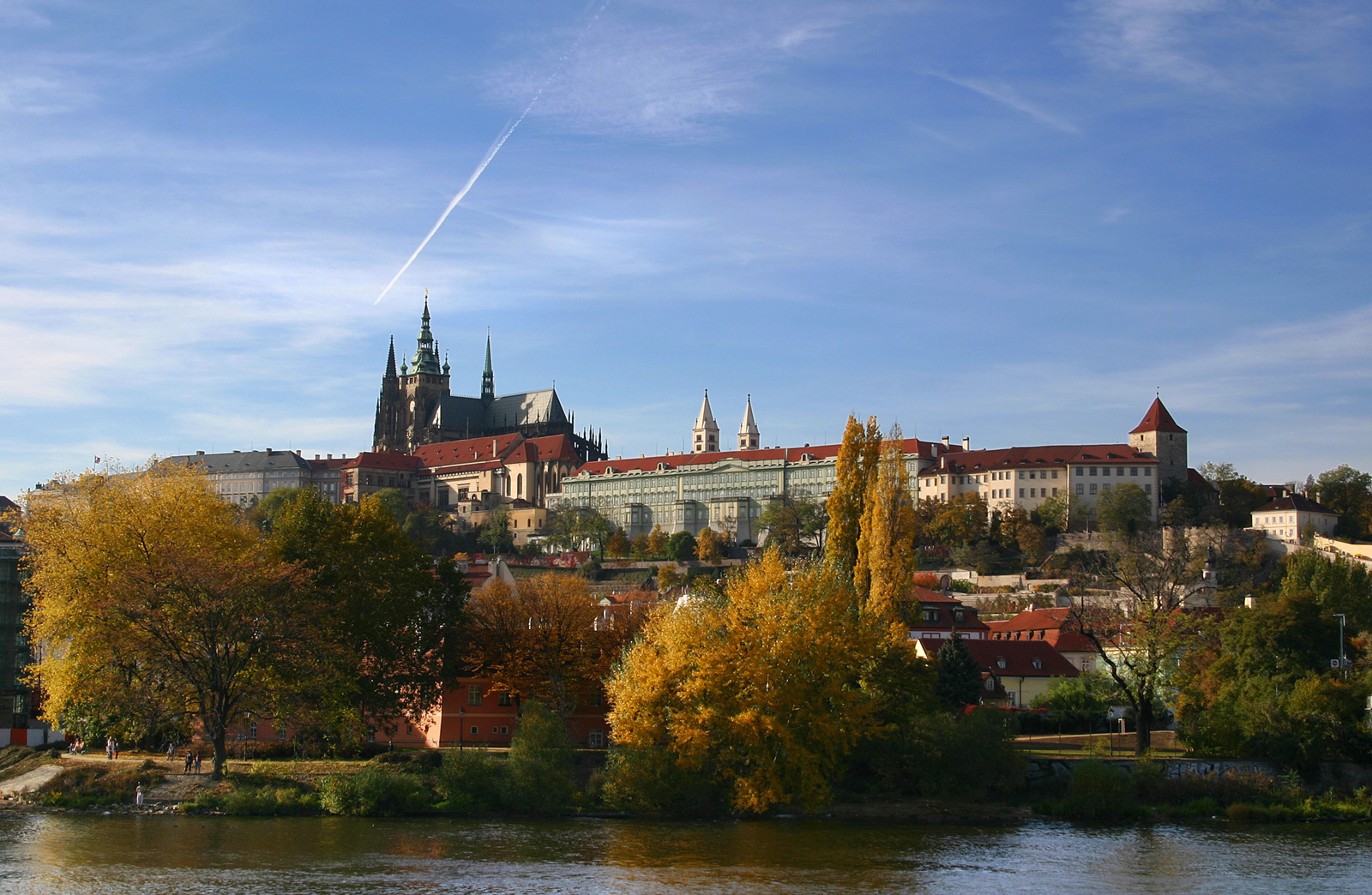
Prague Castle

Drains, sewers and water supply tunnels often have a more than superficial resemblance to pedestrian tunnels and have added to legends of mysterious passages of secretive and ambiguous purposes.

An example of a medieval building with many subterranean passages is Prague Castle. In the Middle Ages underground passages were dug out mainly for purposes of defence. Later drainage conduits transported waste water to the foot of the castle wall and then let it fall freely over the slope of the bare cliff face into the bed of the Brusnice stream. The inhabitants of the castle complained of the smell of the slope, so the conduits were extended to the Brusnice stream. One leads from Hradcany Square and the other, known as the castle passage, from the second castle courtyard to the bottom of the Deer Moat.

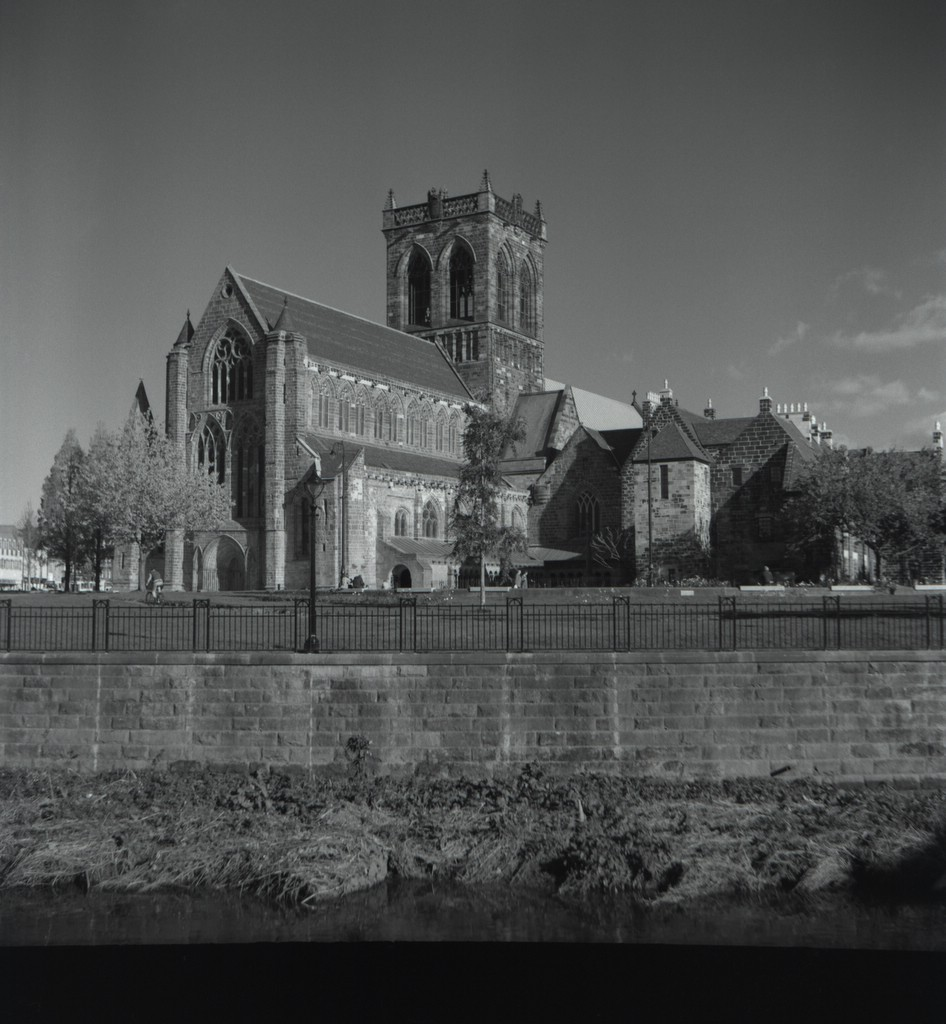
Paisley Abbey

At Paisley Abbey in Scotland, few of the original monastic buildings survived into the 20th century, so landscaping of the area around the church in 1990 provided an ideal opportunity to investigate the positions of those now "lost" channels. The main drain, which would have brought fresh water into the complex and taken away the effluents, would have acted as the spinal column of the buildings. Local knowledge led to the rediscovery of a substantial medieval drain with fine stonework and enough space for a person to walk through.

In Exeter, South Devon, medieval tunnels dating from the 14th century under the High Street are a unique ancient monument. The tunnels were built to house the pipes that brought fresh water to the city. These underground passages have long exercised a fascination over local people, bringing stories of buried treasure, secret escape routes, passages for nuns and priests—even a ghost on a bicycle. Their purpose was simple: to bring clean drinking water from natural springs in fields lying outside the walled city through lead pipes into the heart of the city.

=== Siege mines or tunnels ===
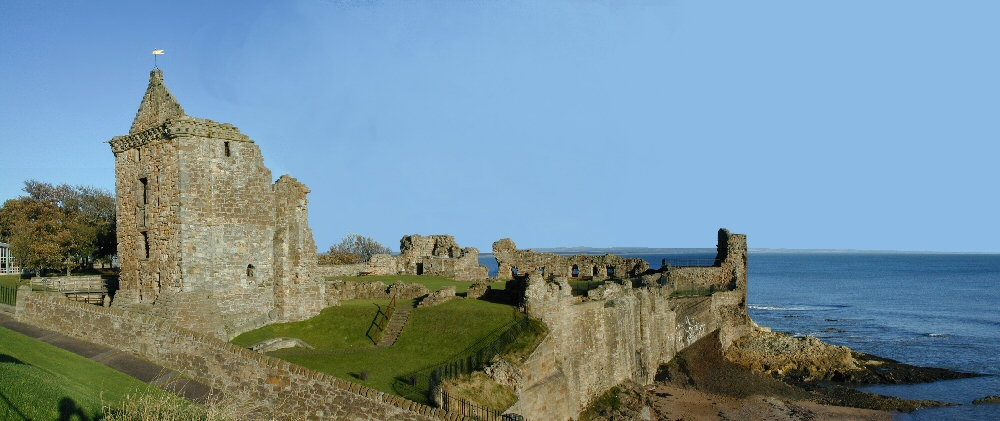
Saint Andrews castle ruins

Such tunnels may have led to the creation and survival of local legends of subterranean passages. An example of a well documented tunnels is the one dug at St Andrews in Scotland. Cardinal Beaton in March 1546, had the Protestant preacher, George Wishart, burnt at the stake in front of his castle walls and this was subsequently used as a pretext for Beaton's murder at the hands of local Protestant lairds who captured the castle by stealth.

A long siege followed on the orders of the Regent, the Earl of Arran, but by November 1546 this had resulted in a stalemate. A determined effort to undermine the walls of the castle via a spacious tunnel large enough to take pack animals was intercepted, after several false starts, by the defenders. They dug a low, narrow and twisting countermine through the rock that eventually broke into the mine itself.

=== Escape tunnels ===
Many medieval buildings are said to have had escape tunnels, secret by nature and hence likely to be the stuff of myth, legend and exaggeration. One example is the escape tunnel running from Maynooth Castle with its exit at the tower in Laraghbryan. A short escape tunnel has been located at Loudoun Castle in Ayrshire, Scotland, which leads from the old kitchens to a 'tunnel-like' bridge over a burn. Other escape tunnels were longer, such as at Nottingham Castle, where the young king Edward III was imprisoned by Roger de Mortimer, 1st Earl of March. In 1330 a small group of armed supporters of Edward III used a secret passage to attack Mortimer. The attackers entered through a long, winding secret passage which led directly into the castle, allowing them to surprise and capture Mortimer, releasing the king, who was unharmed.

An example exists of an escape tunnel built in Covenanting times at Newholm in Dolphinton parish, Lanarkshire. This tunnel was built by Major Joseph Learmont, a leading member of the Covenanter cause who fought at Rullion Green and Bothwell Bridge. He hid within the 40 yard long stone lined tunnel when necessary and evaded capture for 16 years until traditionally said to have been betrayed by a maidservant. The stone lining was eventually used to build a walled garden; it had run from a cellar to a turf dyke in mossy ground. Remains of it may have been discovered in the 1960s, however details are sparse.

=== Smugglers' tunnels ===
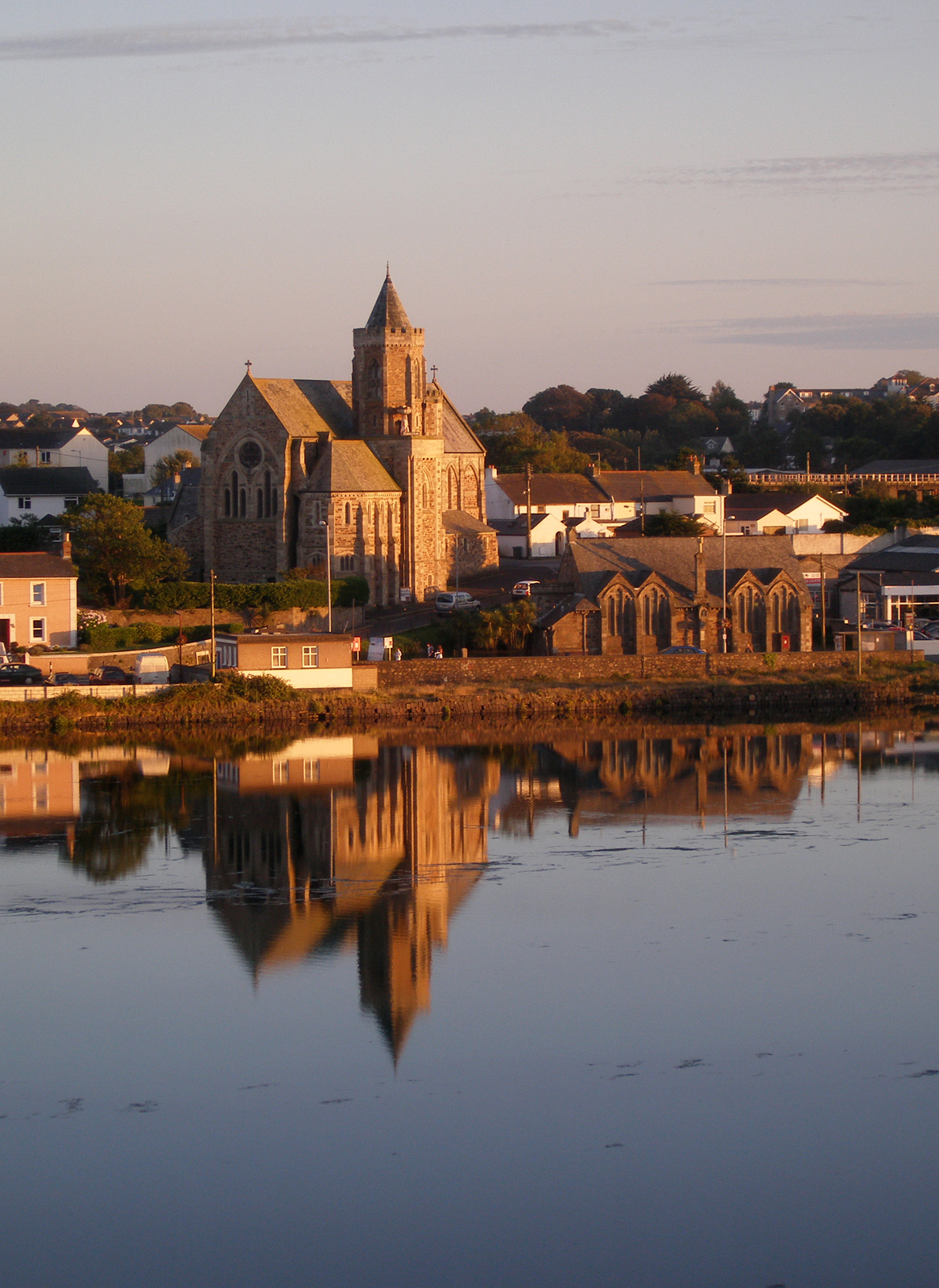
The Copperhouse Pool, Hayle

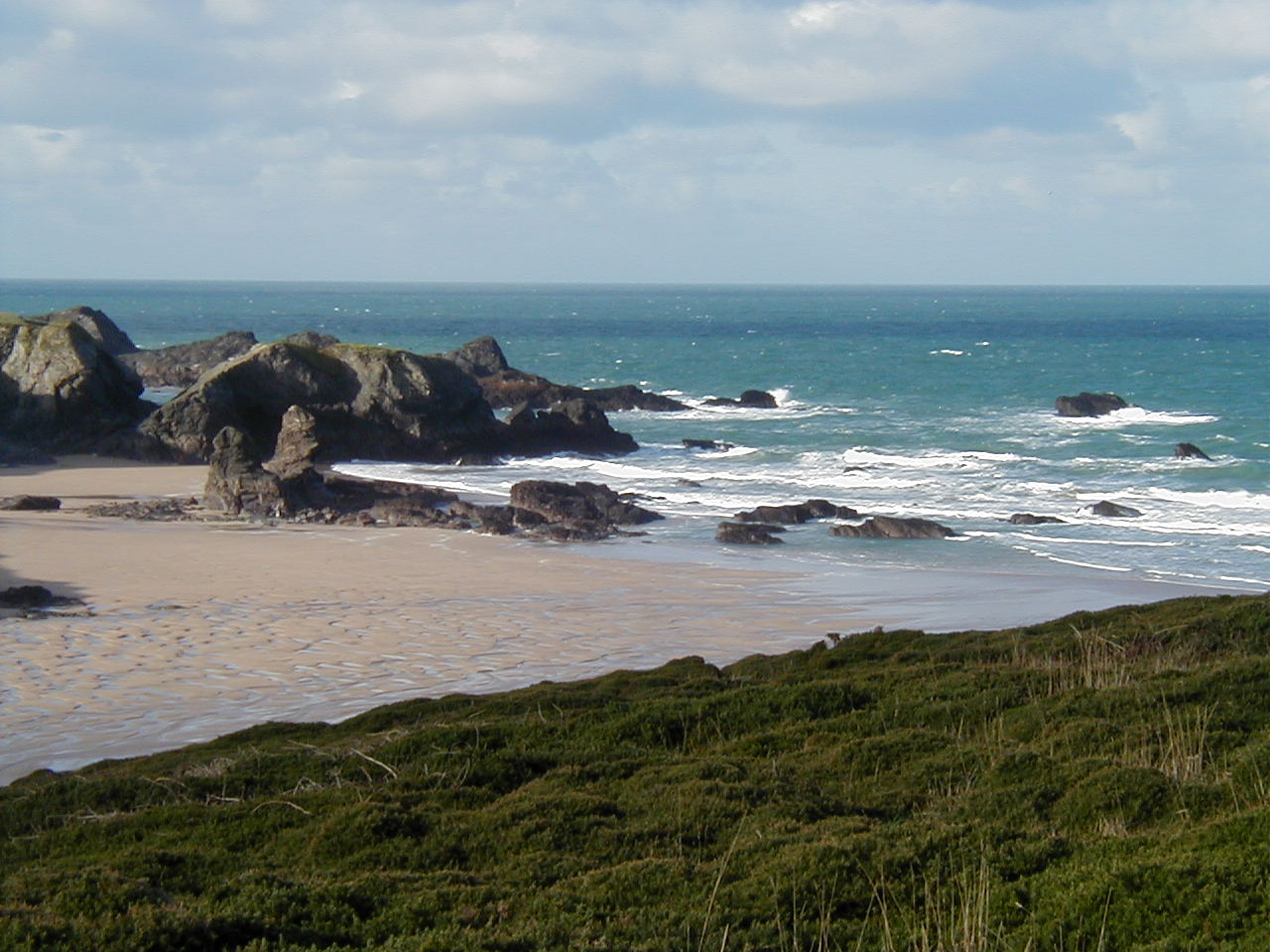
Porthcothan Bay

Many villages on the southern coast of England have a local legend of a smugglers' tunnel; the entrances to most of the actual smuggler's tunnels have been lost or bricked up.

Some tunnel stories turn out to be very plausible, such as the tunnel at Hayle in Cornwall which really does seem to have been built specifically for smuggling. More modern tunnels can be found along New England's coast. In other instances the tunnel either doubles as a storm drain or some other functional channel, or else is an extension of a natural fissure in the rock, as at Methleigh and Porthcothan.

Beith in North Ayrshire was a notorious haunt of smugglers at one time, and legend has it that a tunnel ran from the town centre down to Kilbirnie Loch.

== See also ==
- Secret passage
- Shanghai tunnels
- Smuggling tunnel
