= Siemaszko =

Siemaszko is a Polish surname of East Slavic origin, the Polish transliteration of the surname Semashko. Notable people with the surname include:

- Artur Siemaszko (born 1997), Polish footballer
- Casey Siemaszko (born 1961), American actor
- Ewa Siemaszko (born 1947), Polish writer, publicist and lecturer
- Nina Siemaszko (born 1970), American actress
- Rafał Siemaszko (born 1986), Polish footballer
- Władysław Siemaszko (1919–2025), Polish publicist and lawyer, member of the Polish resistance Armia Krajowa
