= Semashko =

Semashko is an East Slavic surname originated from a diminutive for the given name Semyon (Simeon). The Belarusian-language spelling is Syamashka.

Spelled in Polish as Siemaszko, it was a surname of nobility in Poland (Siemaszko of Łabędź coat of arms, officially recorded in Volyn Governorate)

Notable people with the surname include:

- Dominik Semashko (1878-1932), Belarusian activist
- Nikolai Semashko (medicine)
- Nikolai Semashko (basketball)
- Yosyf Semashko (1798-1868), bishop in the Uniate and Orthodox churches

== See also ==
- Semaška
- Simashko
