= Julian Simashko =

Russian zoologist and entomologist

Julian Ivanovich Simashko (Russian: Юлиан Иванович Симашко; 1821–1893) was a Russian zoologist and entomologist.

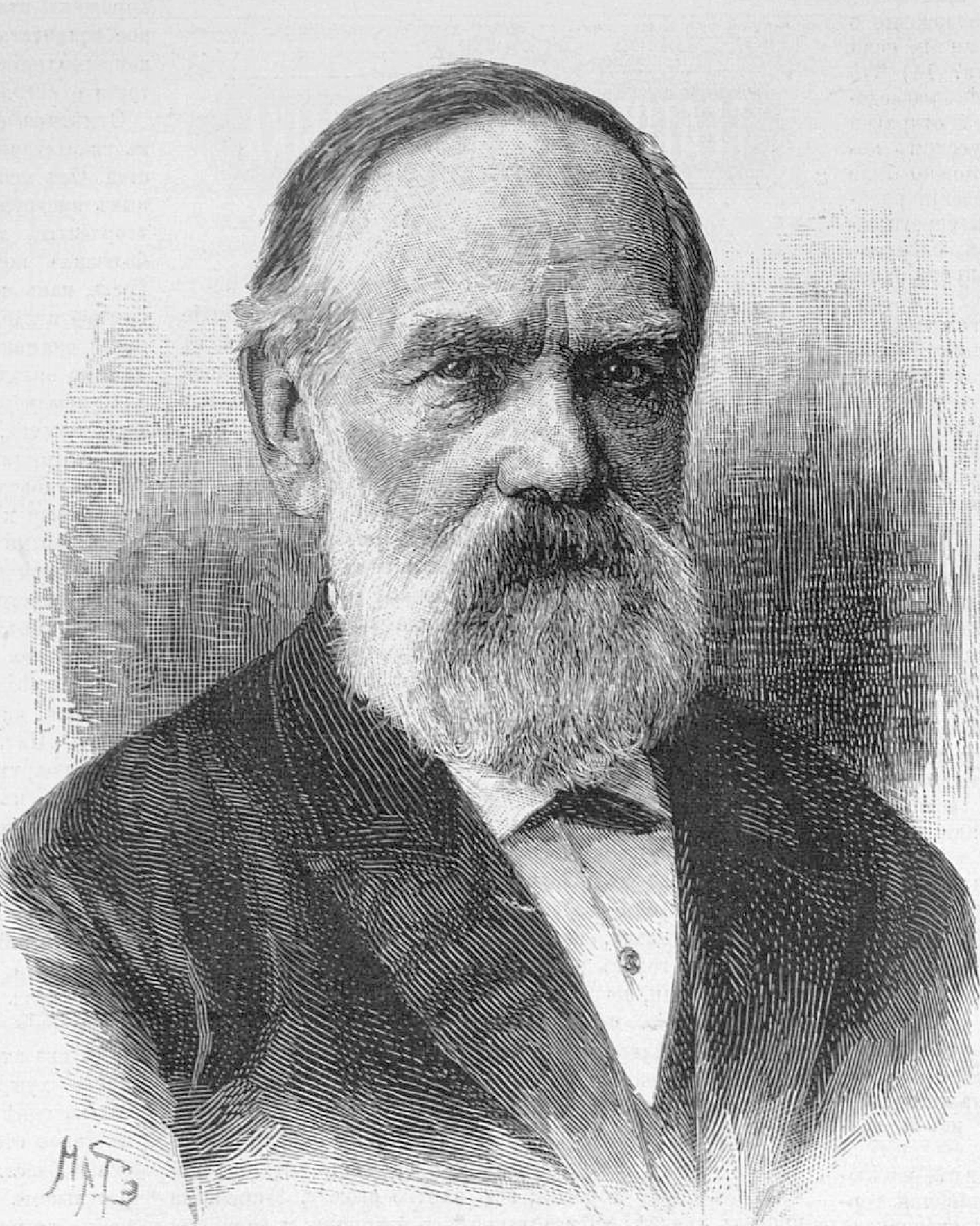
The portrait of Julian Simashko

He wrote Russkaya Fauna published in Saint Petersburg in 1850, the first work on Russian fauna to include the Caucasus.
