= Memus =

Coordinates: 56.7206°N 2.9394°W

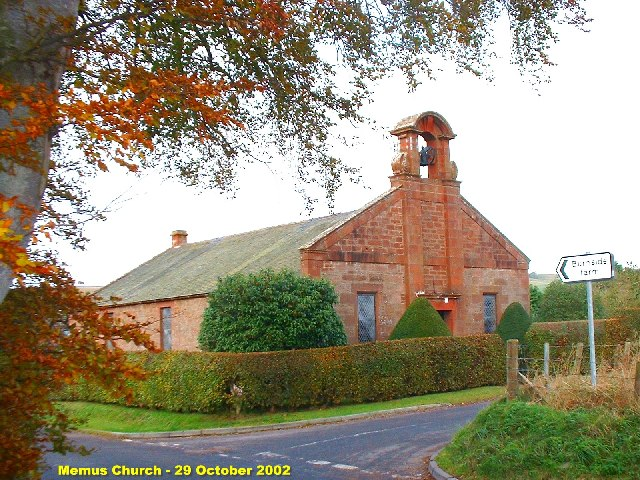
- Memus Church

- Location within Angus
- Population: est.
- OS grid reference: NO427589
- Council area: Angus
- Lieutenancy area: Angus
- Country: Scotland
- Sovereign state: United Kingdom
- Post town: FORFAR
- Postcode district: DD8
- Dialling code: 01307
- Police: Scotland
- Fire: Scottish
- Ambulance: Scottish
- UK Parliament: Angus
- Scottish Parliament: Angus North East Scotland

Memus is a small village in Angus, Scotland, north of Kirriemuir. It is home to the Drovers Pub. A story is told of a kelpie at Shielhill Bridge, leaving its cloven hoofprint behind on a stone as a petrosomatoglyph.
