= Rock-cut basin =

Cylindrical depression cut into stream or river beds

A rock-cut basin is a natural cylindrical depression cut into stream or river beds, often filled with water. Such plucked-bedrock pits are created by kolks; powerful vortices within the water currents which spin small boulders around, eroding out these rock basins by their abrasive action. These basins are frequently found in streams and rivers with relatively soft rock substrates such as limestones and sandstones. The rather unusual and man-made appearance of such depressions has led to various folk-tales becoming associated with them, such as their identification as petrosomatoglyphs, including knee prints, elbow prints, etc. of saints, heroes, kings or supernatural beings.

== Formation ==
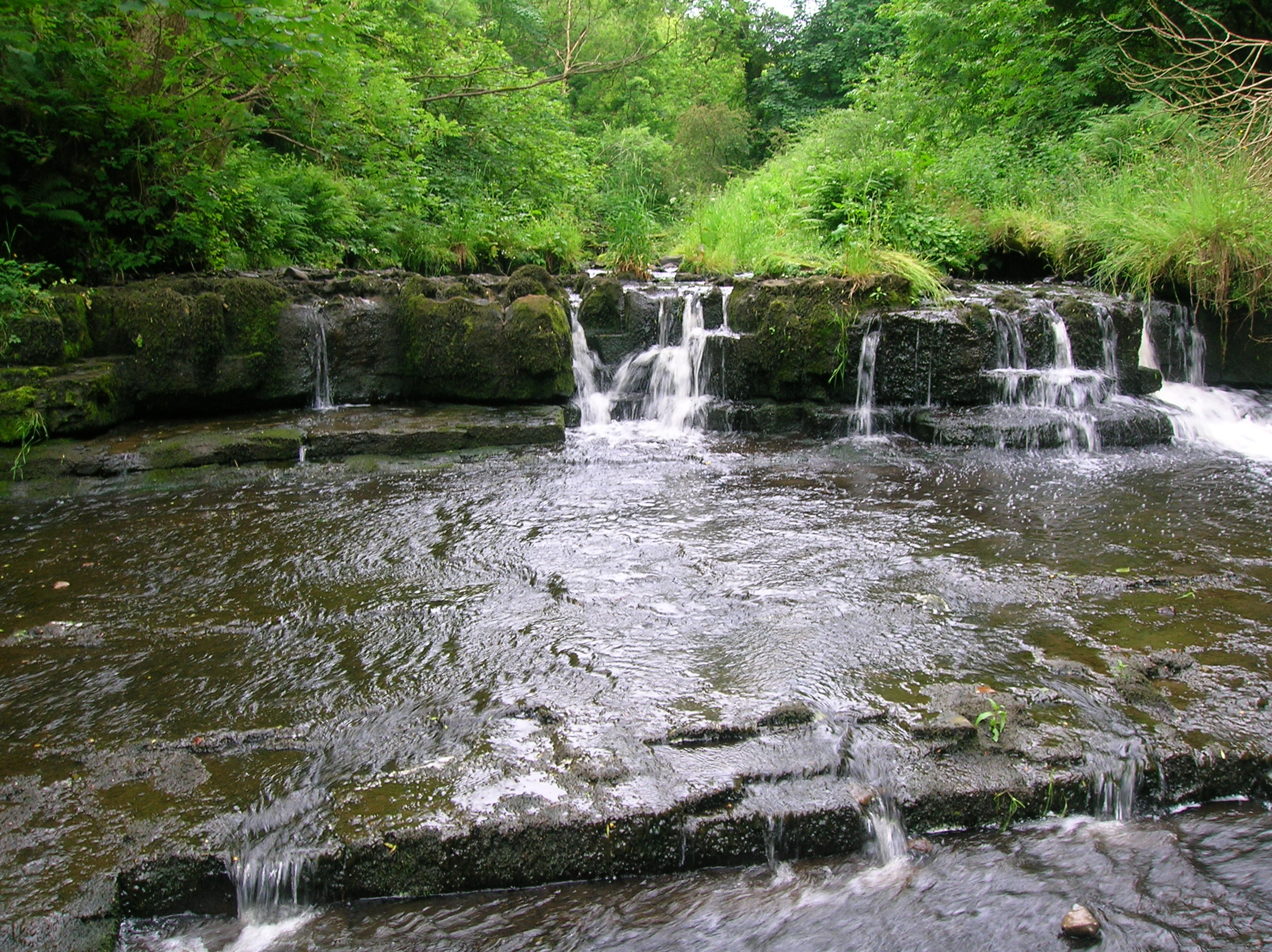
The Caaf Water running over limestone: a good site for rock-cut basins.

Rock-cut basins are formed by the action of fast running water currents that cause small boulders to move in a circular motion or vortex. The friction created by these kolks propelling small boulders in a circular motion erodes the natural rock substrate to create concavities called rock-cut basins, that increase in depth and circumference over the years. One or more rounded stones may be found within them, often of varying sizes as these stones also wear away with the physical abrasion effect.

The conditions on the river bed must be just right, so that the 'abrasion stones' remain in approximately one area as they circle, allowing the processes which create the rock-cut basins to occur. During times of heavy flood, river currents provide considerable energy to stones lying on the bottom, as can be witnessed beside many rivers where audible sounds are made by boulders as they are tumbled downstream over the bedrock or as they clash against other boulders. The term Bed load is used to describe the material carried by a river by being bounced or rolled along its bed.

== Folklore ==
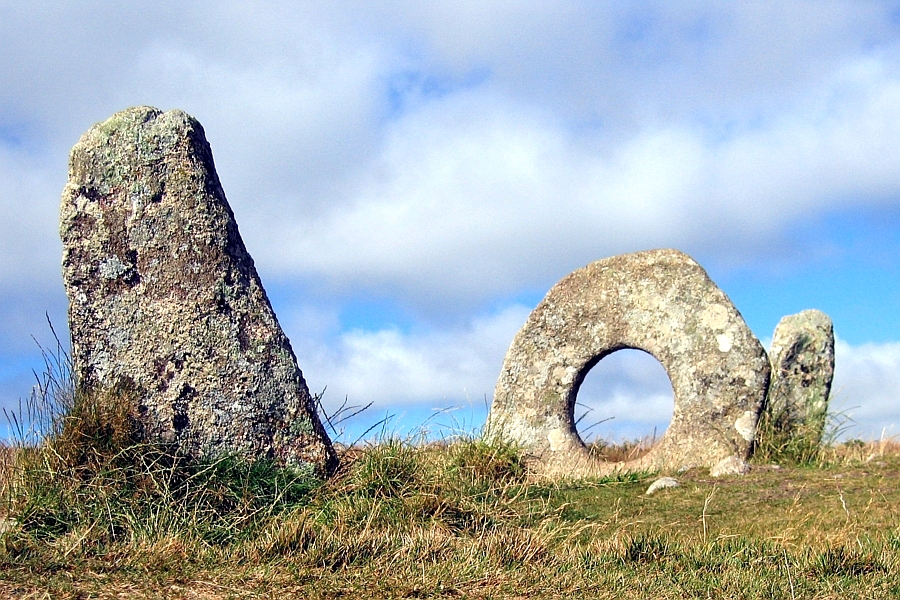
Men-an-tol and the 'holed stone' which may have been a rock-cut basin

If a rock-cut basin forms on an overhanging ledge at a waterfall or drop in the river level, then a circular holed stone may eventually form. These may have been used in the construction of megalithic monuments, especially tombs. Such holed stones are often associated with folklore as healing stones through which sick children are passed etc., as with the Mên-an-Tol in Cornwall, where the legend is that passage through the stone will cure a child of rickets (osteomalacia), also scrofula as well as spinal conditions in men and women. For centuries, children with rickets were passed naked through the hole in the middle stone nine times, or three times against the sun.

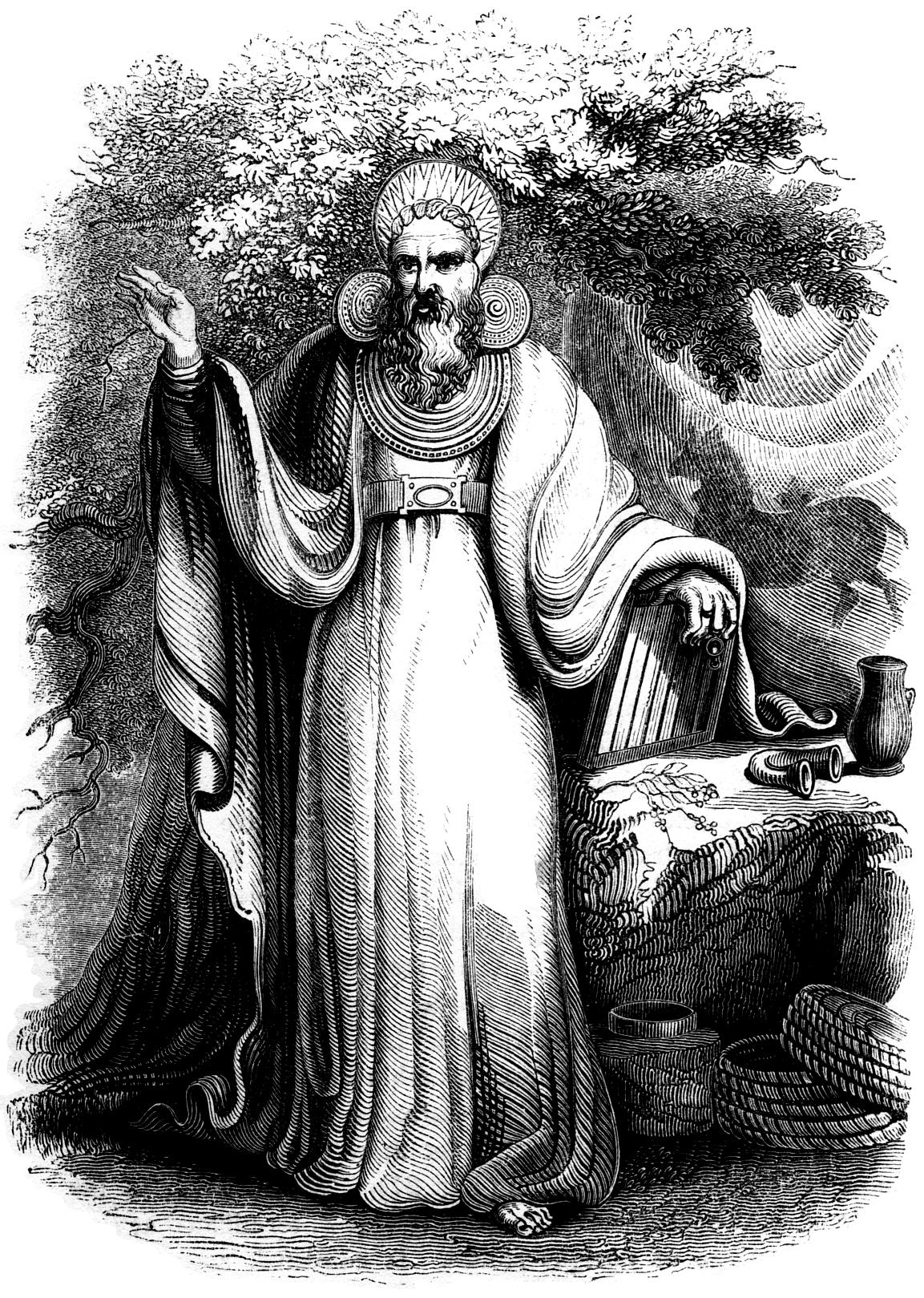
Artist's impression of a druid, drawn 1835

Below the confluence of the North Teign River and the Walla Brook on Dartmoor there is a large boulder covered with rock-cut basins, one of which the kolks have completely worn through and therefore the stone has an almost perfectly circular hole. The holed stone thus produced is called the 'Tolmen' stone and it has, like others, been the focus for some stories of magical cures and mystical activities. It is said that passing through the hole is a cure for rheumatism or arthritis, whilst children would be cured of whooping-cough or tuberculosis. Another legend is that if you pass through the hole you will see the future. This may be linked to the belief, recorded elsewhere, that looking through a holed stone gives a person 'second sight', and some later Christian pilgrim sites retain the holed stones which exist in the area so that pilgrims may get a 'glimpse of heaven.' Connected with this was the belief by that looking through a piece of grass made into a circle one was given second sight into the land of the supernatural, making fairies visible, etc.

Passing through the stone may be symbolic of 'rebirth', however it seems that the idea of transferring the disease or condition to the stone was uppermost in the thoughts of the practitioners. To add weight to this idea it has been recorded that sick children were also passed through double-rooted bramble hoops, split ash trees and even holes in the ground.

Faithless wives and wantons were punished and put back on the 'right track' by forcing them first to wash in Cranmere Pool on Dartmoor, then to run round Scorhill circle three times, then they had to pass through the Tolmen stone and finally they went up to the Grey Wethers stone circle where they knelt and asked forgiveness. If the stones remained standing then all was well, but if their penance was not sincere then a stone would fall and crush them.

=== Marriages and other binding contracts ===
Folklore connected with holed stones indicates that they were also used for a ceremony of grasping hands to form a Teltown marriage, this being a marriage of a year and a day in which either party could return to the spot a year later, renounce the marriage and walk away from the stone and their partner. It is also recorded that hands shaken through a holed stone created unbreakable agreements or contracts.

=== Druids ===
Tolmen stones, said to derive from the Cornish tol (hole) maen (stone), were thought to have been used by Druids for purification and that the wrongdoer was lowered through into the water for 'lustration', a purification rite or cleansing ritual.

Until recently the role of perforated stones may have been twofold; use in fertility or healing rites and as traditional settings for the pledging of vows between couples. The hole in the stone might also represent the female birth canal in the Druid or 'pagan' mind and by passing through it a person was symbolising the act of rebirth and therefore regaining innocence or being cleansed of post-parturition illness, etc.

=== Witches ===
The Killoch Burn and glen near Neilston in East Renfrewshire, Scotland has become associated with a witch because at low water the numerous 'pot-holes' have worn into one another, giving fantastic shapes. Locals named some of these the witch's floor, hearth, cradle, water-stoup and grave.

== Seashore rock-cut basins ==
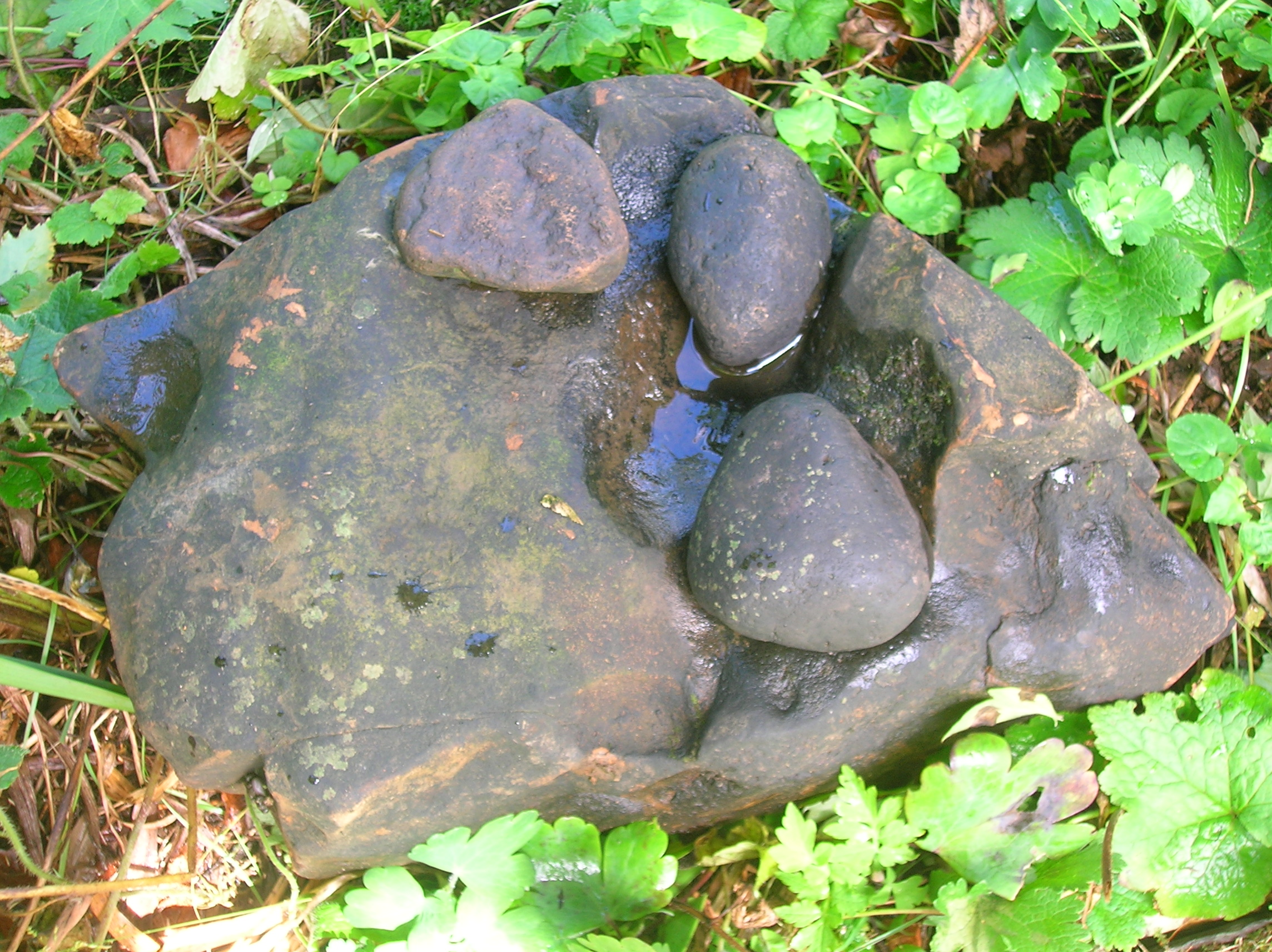
A bullaun made from rock-cut basins in Chapeltoun, Ayrshire, Scotland

All around the coastline of the island of Coll are found rock-cut holes and basins which some people believe them to be prehistoric, related to the cup marks found in many places. Others think that they are bait holes, used for grinding shellfish such as limpets in order to attract fish. Another theory is that they were used for offerings in order to help the safe return of people out at sea. The prehistoric village at Maes Howe had similar sized and shaped basins made from flat stones and possibly sealed with clay, used perhaps for storing bait. Although some of the holes on Coll may be natural, such as this large basin washed by the tide, many others are in locations and are of shapes which show that they are definitely man-made.

== Man made basins ==
Many examples exist, created for a wide range of purposes from the grinding of fish bait to a possible ritual use for the inauguration of kings such as at Dunadd. Bullauns may fall into this category.

== Details of rock-cut basins ==
These photographs were all taken on the Caaf Water, Lynn Glen, Dalry, Ayrshire, Scotland. The water conditions must be precisely right to create a fully formed kolk as shown by their absence or partial formation in sub-optimal parts of the same river system. Large basins form where the water flow is forceful and many small basins occur where the flow is fast, but the water shallower, such as near the edge of a waterfall. The stone substrate is made of fossiliferous limestone in these photographs.

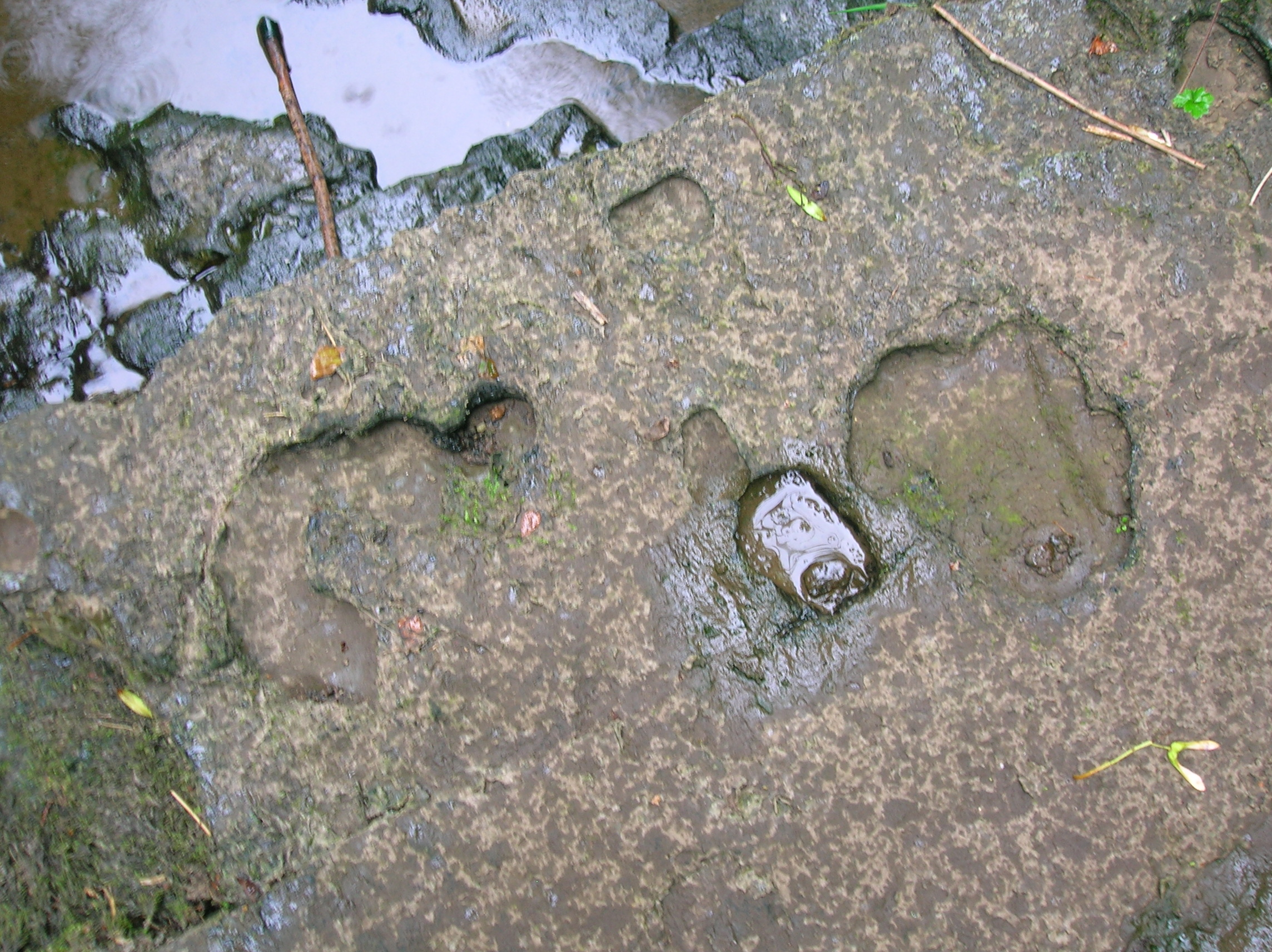
Small basins cut by pebbles in fast moving water near the edge of the waterfall

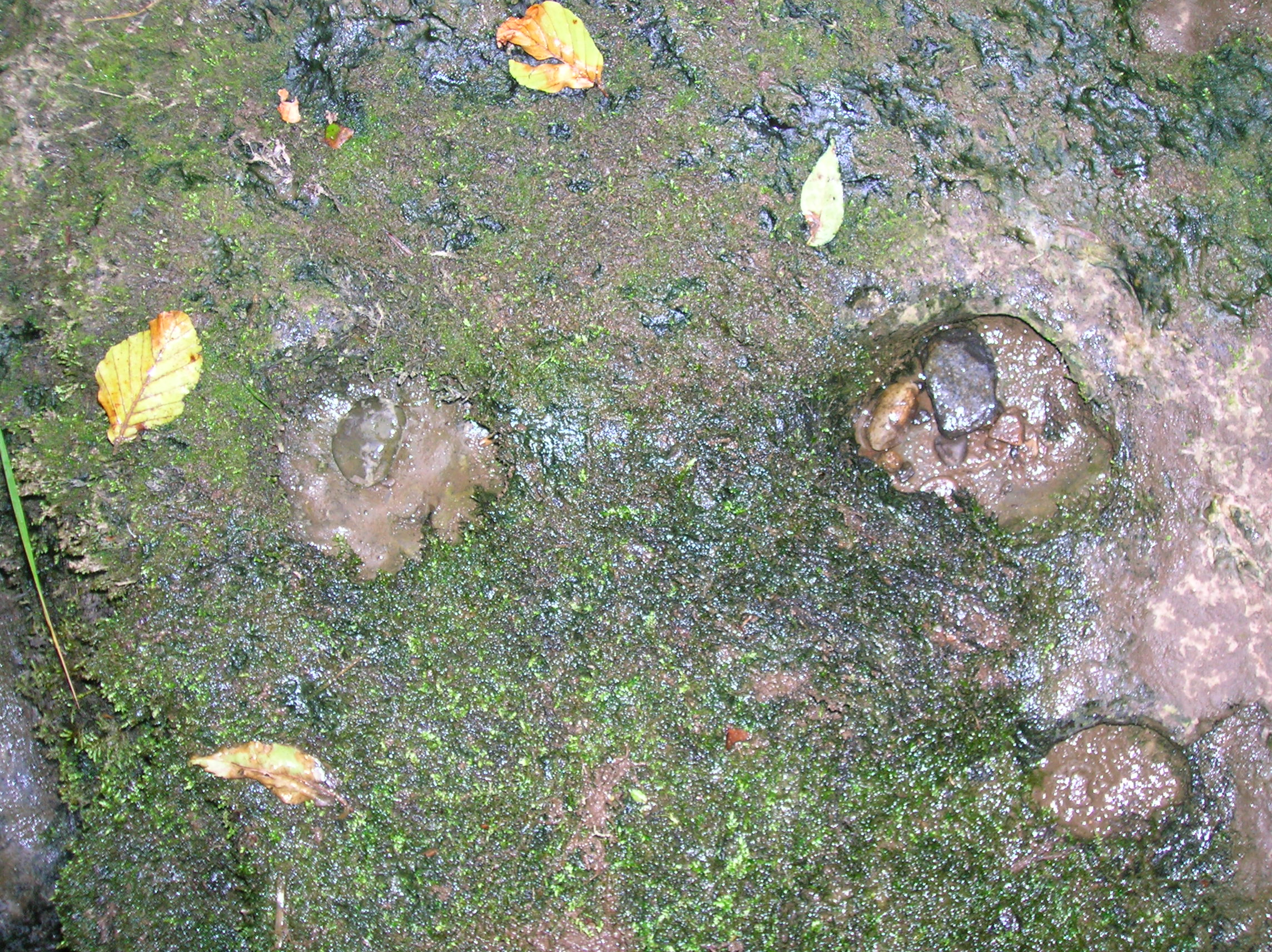
Further examples of small kolk action in fast flowing water

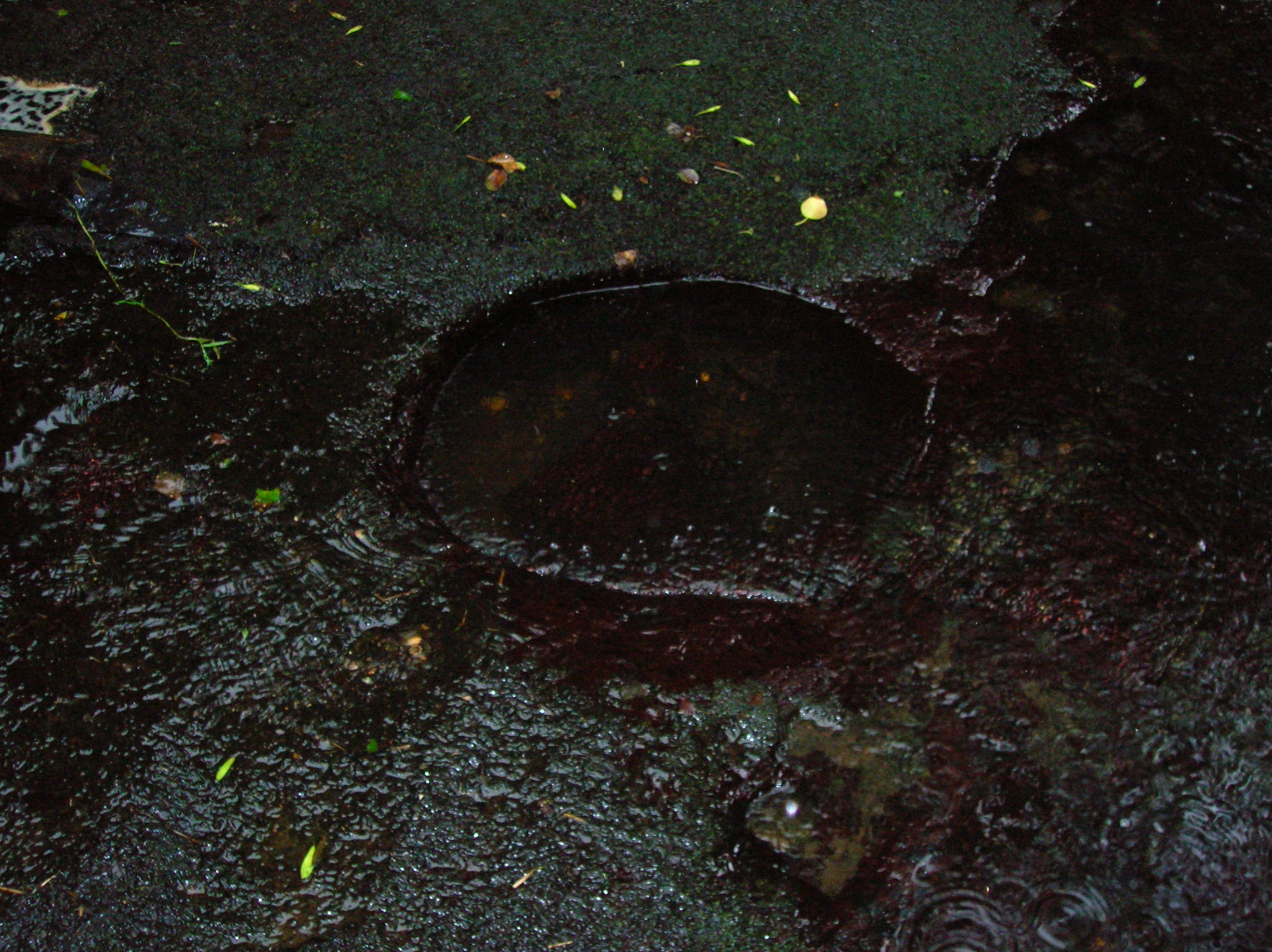
A large rock-cut basin with small 'kolk moved' boulders in it

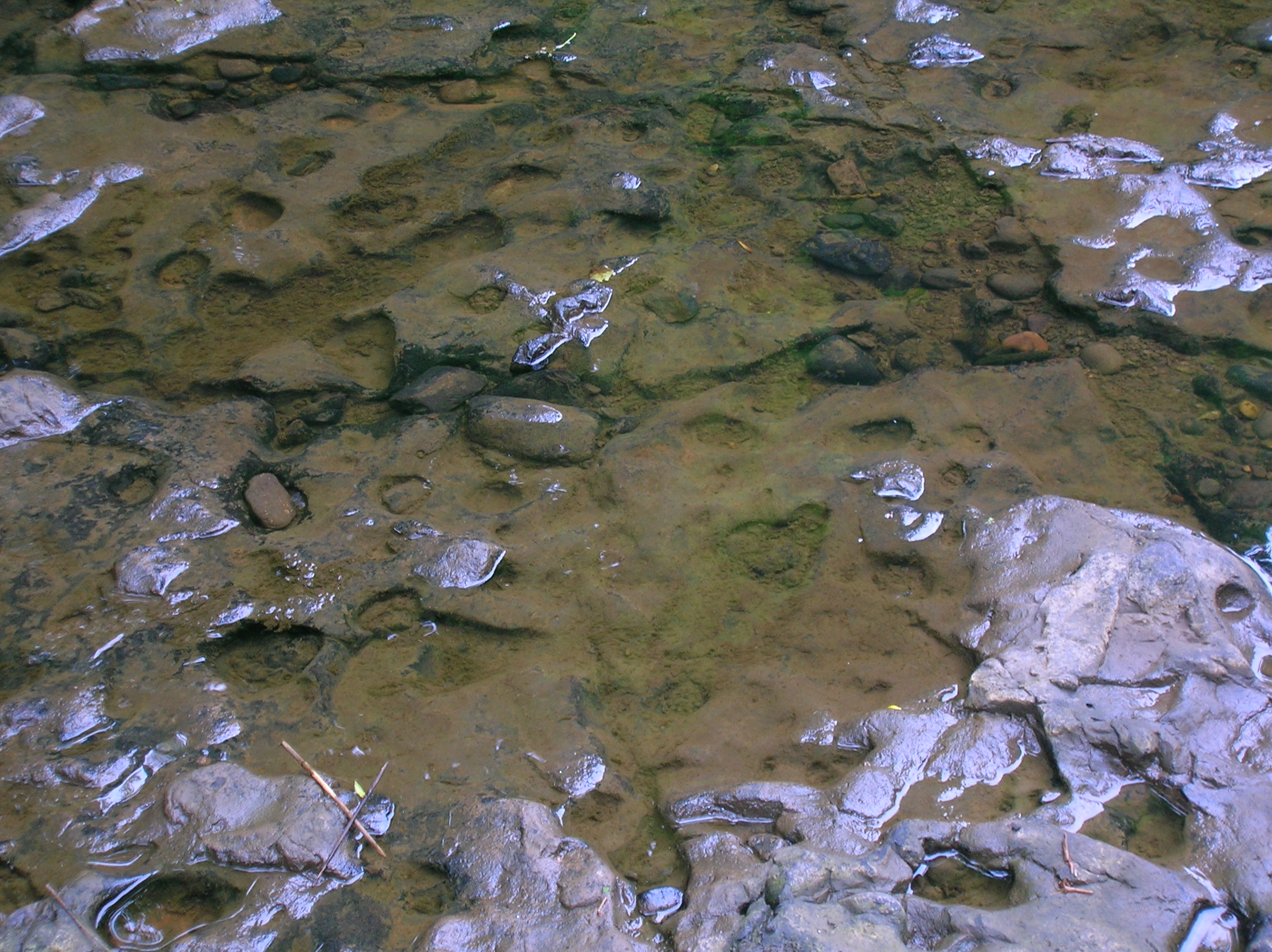
Basins en masse

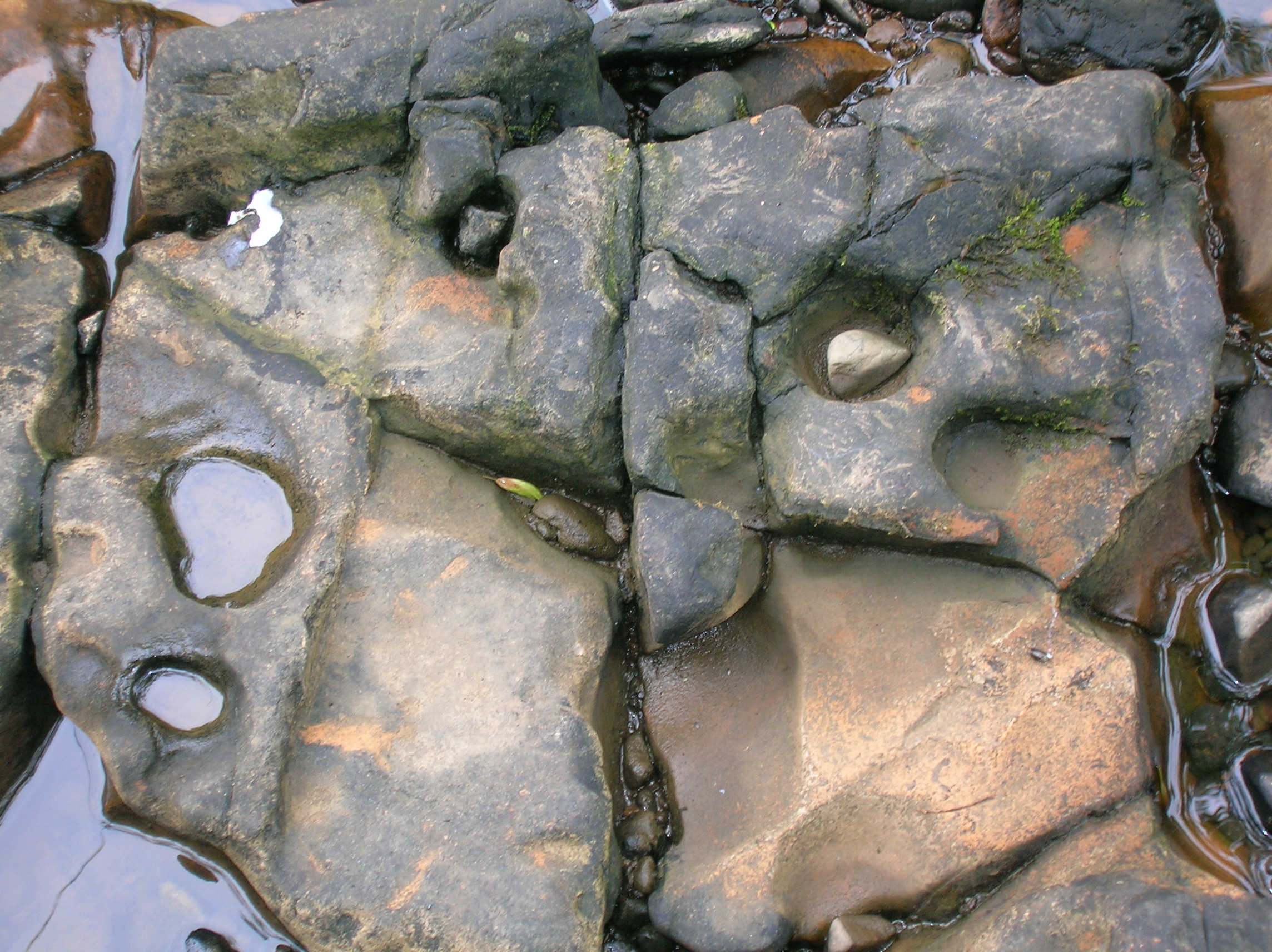
Basins with the eroding pebble in situ. Very low water levels.

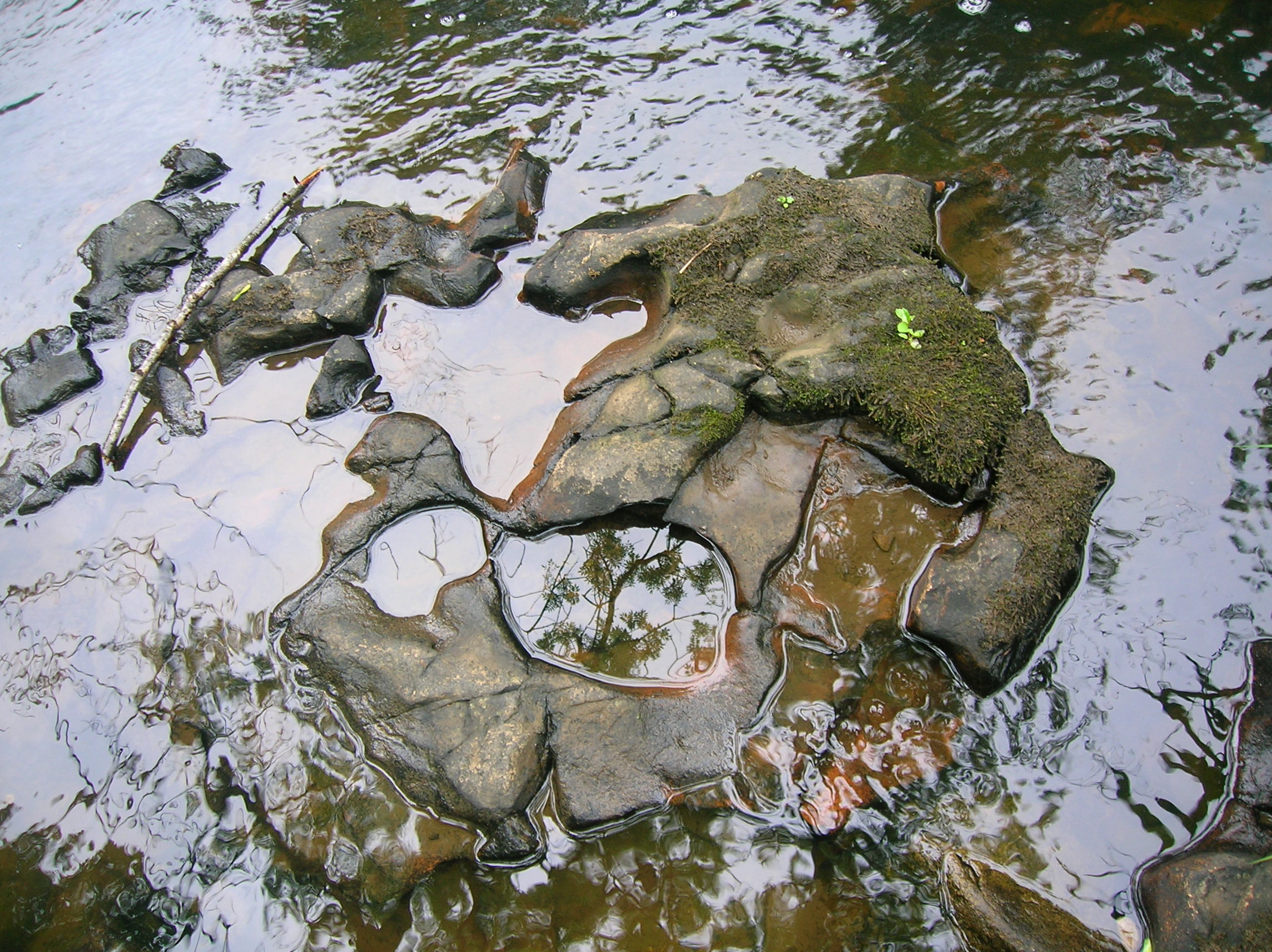
Various basins just off the main current

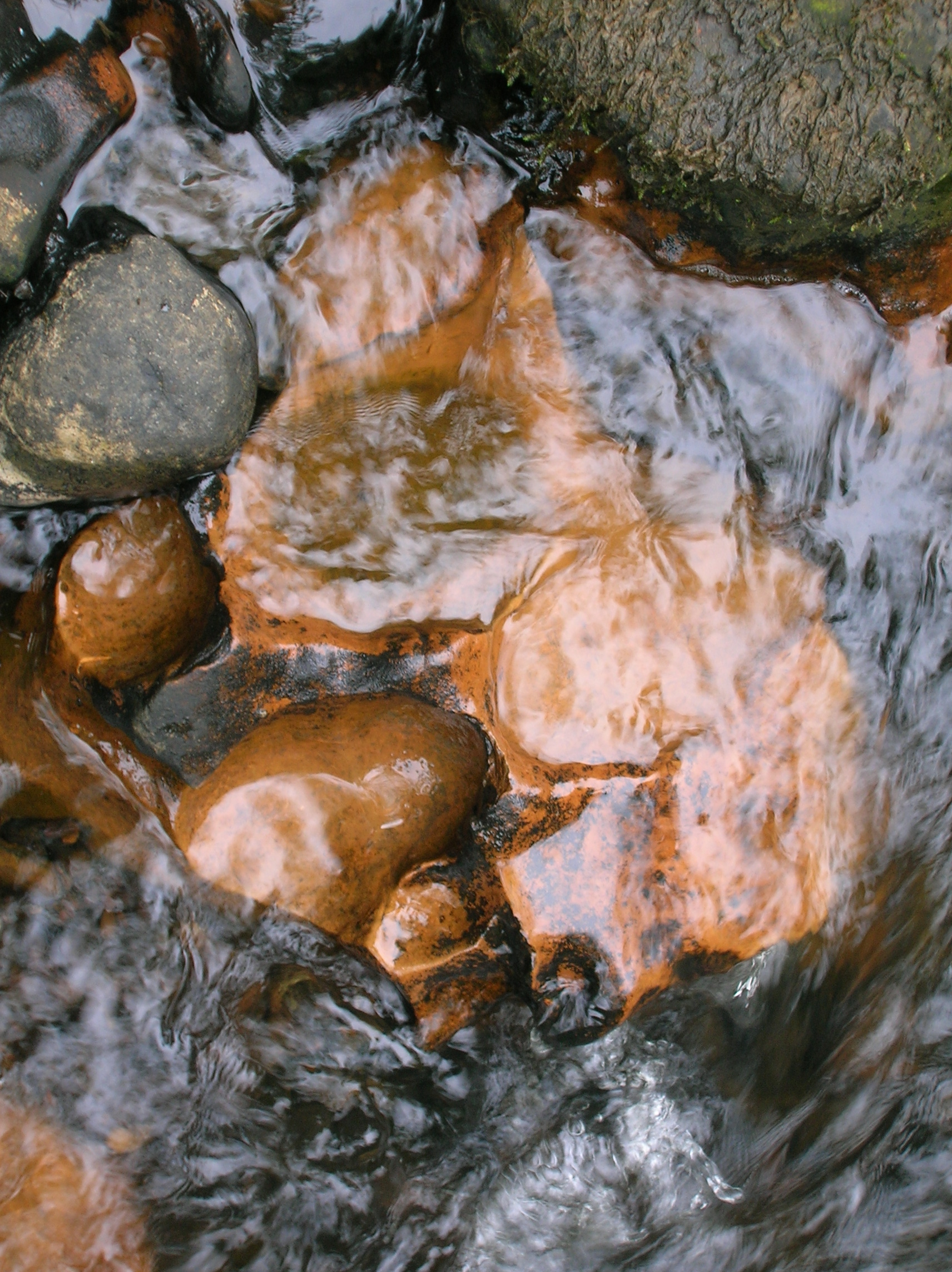
Several basins in the main current, of different ages, have overlapped and lost their integrity.

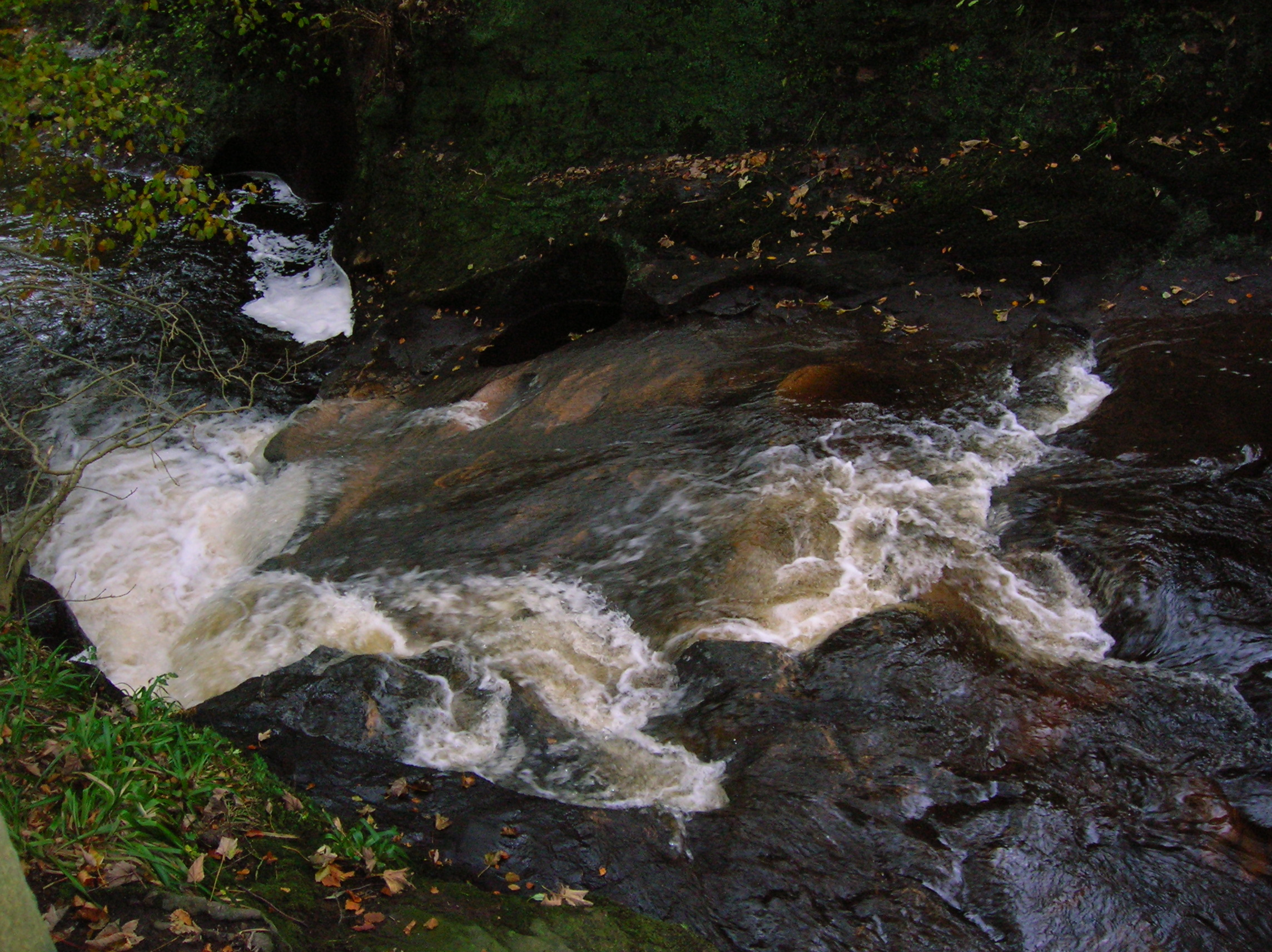
A particularly large basin near Peden's Pulpit on the Caaf Water

== See also ==
- Marriage stone – more on holestones
