= Kolk (vortex) =

Underwater vortex

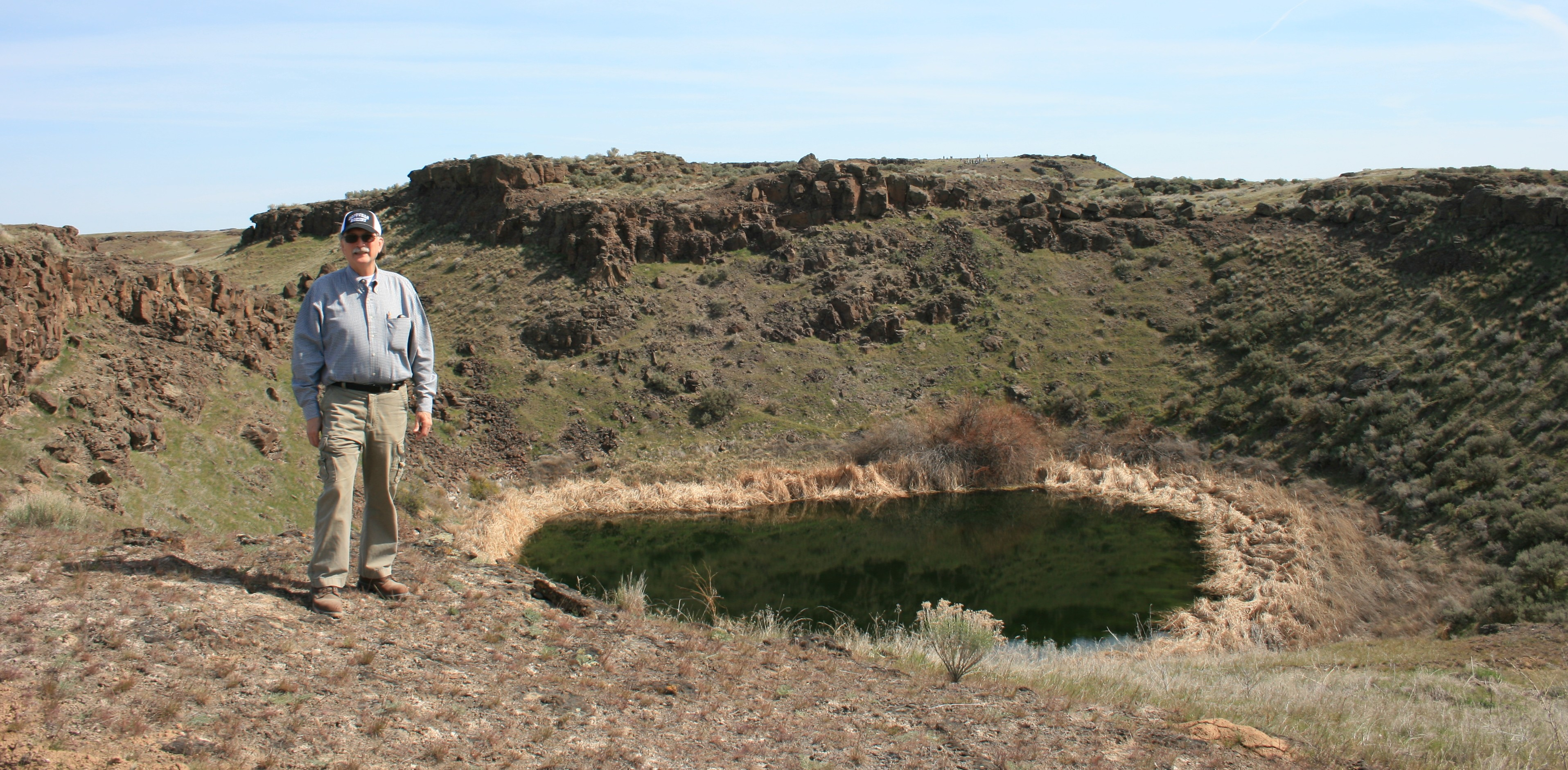
One of many kolk-formed depressions or "potholes" in the channeled scablands in eastern Washington at 46°54′21.40″N 119°16′47″W.

A kolk is an underwater vortex causing hydrodynamic scour by rapidly rushing water past an underwater obstacle. High-velocity gradients produce a high-shear rotating column of water, similar to a tornado. Kolks can pluck multiple-ton blocks of rock and transport them in suspension for kilometres.

Kolks leave clear evidence in the form of kolk lakes, a kind of plucked-bedrock pits or rock-cut basin. Kolks also leave downstream deposits of gravel-supported blocks that show percussion but no rounding.

== Examples ==
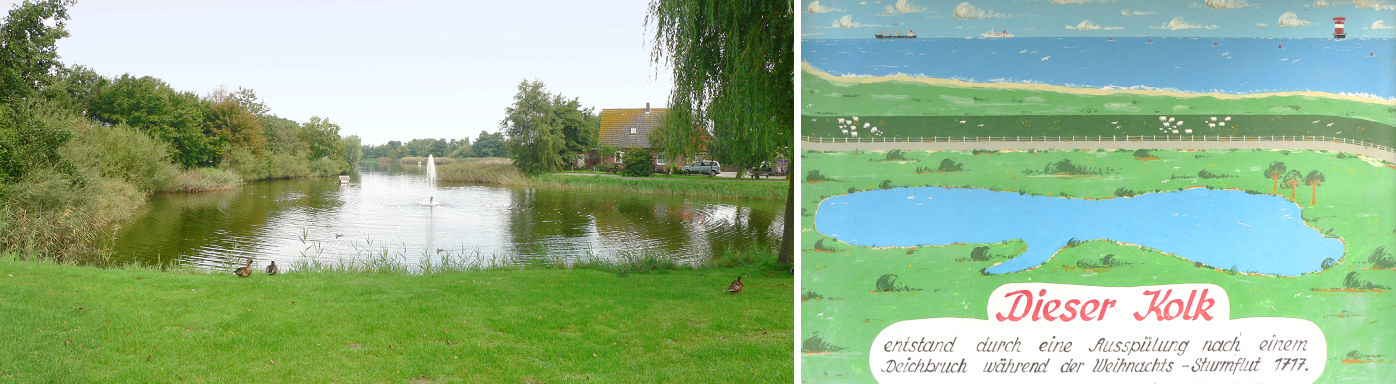
Kolk from the 1717 Christmas flood in Horumersiel (de: Horumersiel) with information board

Kolks were first identified by the Dutch, who observed kolks hoisting several-ton blocks of riprap from dikes and transporting them away, suspended above the bottom. The Larrelt kolk near Emden appeared during the 1717 Christmas flood which broke through a long section of the dyke. The newly formed body of water measured roughly 500 × 100 m and was 25 m deep. In spite of the repair to the dyke, another breach occurred in 1721, which produced more kolks between 15 and 18 m deep. In 1825 during the February flood near Emden, a kolk of 31 m depth was created. The soil was saturated from here for a further 5 km inland.

Kolks are credited with creating the pothole-like features in the highly jointed basalts in the channeled scablands of the Columbia Basin region in Eastern Washington. Depressions were scoured out within the scablands that resemble virtually circular steep-sided potholes. Examples from the Missoula floods in this area include:

- The region below Dry Falls includes a number of lakes scoured out by kolks.
- Sprague Lake is a kolk-formed basin created by a flow estimated to be 8 miles (13 km) wide and 200 feet (60 m) deep.
- The Alberton Narrows on the Clark Fork River show evidence that kolks plucked boulders from the canyon and deposited them in a rock and gravel bar immediately downstream of the canyon.
- The south wall of Hellgate Canyon in Montana shows the rough-plucked surface characteristic of kolk-eroded rock.
- Both the walls of the Wallula Gap and the Columbia River Gorge also show the rough-plucked surfaces characteristic of kolk-eroded rock.
- Oswego Lake, in the middle of Lake Oswego, Oregon (a Portland suburb), was an abandoned channel of the Tualatin River that was scoured by a kolk.

== See also ==
- Hydrodynamic scour
