= Petrosomatoglyph =

Supposed image of parts of a human or animal body in rock

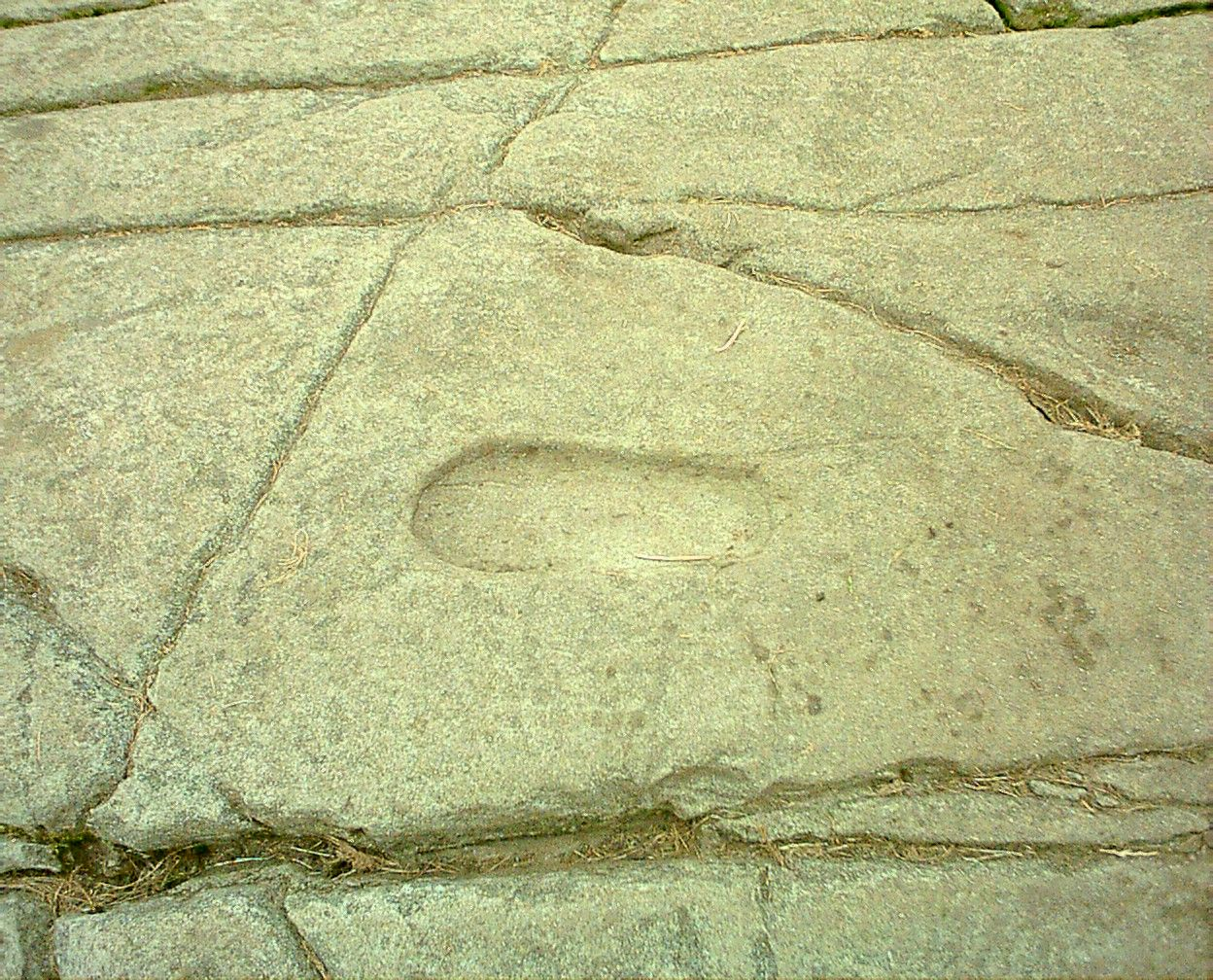
A footprint (replica shown) carved into the rock on Dunadd, in Argyll, is linked to the crowning of the Scots kings of Dál Riata.

A petrosomatoglyph is a supposed image of parts of a human or animal body in rock. They occur all over the world, often functioning as an important form of symbolism, used in religious and secular ceremonies, such as the crowning of kings. Some are regarded as artefacts linked to saints or culture heroes.

The word comes from the Greek πέτρα (petra, 'stone'), σῶμα (soma, 'body'), and γλύφειν (glyphein, 'to carve'). Feet are the most common; however, other features including knees, elbows, hands, heads and fingers are also found.

Stylised representations of parts of the body are often open to dispute and are therefore on the fringes of acceptability as identifiable petrosomatoglyphs. Natural objects, such as rock crystals and rock formations which look like petrosomatoglyphs, whole animals, plants, etc., are collectively called "mimetoliths".

== Definition and classification ==
In archaeology and folklore studies, a petrosomatoglyph is a mark in stone interpreted as resembling a part of a human or animal body, most commonly a footprint. The term is used for both deliberate carvings and natural features in rock that people have understood as bodily impressions.

Such features appear in a range of cultural settings. Some belong to traditions of rock art or prehistoric ritual landscapes, while others became associated with religious stories, local folklore, or the legendary actions of saints, heroes, and supernatural beings. In many cases the physical mark itself is simple, but the cultural meaning attached to it can be extensive.

For analytical purposes, researchers usually distinguish between two broad categories: natural formations and deliberately carved impressions.

=== Natural formations ===
Some petrosomatoglyphs originate as natural shapes in rock that resemble parts of the body. Weathering, erosion, fossil traces, or other geological processes can produce hollows and contours that appear similar to footprints, hands, or other bodily forms.

Although natural in origin, such features often acquired cultural significance. Local traditions sometimes interpreted them as the marks of saints, mythic heroes, giants, or supernatural beings. In some regions these stones became associated with pilgrimage, healing traditions, or sacred landscapes, with the mark serving as a visible point where story and place intersect.

=== Carved impressions ===
Other petrosomatoglyphs are deliberately created by human activity. These include footprints, handprints, or other body shapes pecked or incised into stone surfaces.

Archaeological examples occur in several contexts, including petroglyph traditions and ceremonial landscapes. In parts of northern Europe, carved footprints have been interpreted as elements of royal inauguration rituals. A ruler might stand within the carved outline of a foot as a symbolic act linking the king to the land and to the authority of earlier rulers.

These carvings illustrate how simple bodily forms could carry powerful symbolic meaning, serving as markers of identity, authority, or sacred presence within the landscape.

== Animal petrosomatoglyphs ==
=== Dogs ===
Petrosomatoglyphs attributed to dogs appear in medieval literature and later local traditions, particularly within Arthurian legend. In the Mabinogion, the tale of Culhwch and Olwen describes the hunt of the boar Twrch Trwyth by King Arthur and his companions, a narrative that anchors several landscape features in folklore.

One site linked to this tradition is Cefn Carn Cafall, a ridge near Builth Wells in Breconshire. A depression in a conglomerate boulder on the cairn has been identified in local tradition as the footprint of Arthur's hunting dog, Cafall. Such features are often interpreted as physical traces of legendary events, connecting specific places to narrative traditions. Local folklore holds that the stone cannot be permanently removed and will return to its original position if displaced.

The dog Cafall (also rendered as Cabal) appears in other Arthurian material, including the tale of Geraint, where it is named among Arthur's hunting dogs, reinforcing its place within the wider legendary tradition.

In England, a related tradition is associated with the church at Blythburgh, Suffolk. Marks on stone surfaces there are attributed in local folklore to the Black Dog, a spectral figure said to have entered the church during a storm. Such marks are often interpreted within local belief as evidence of supernatural presence or events.

=== Horses ===
Royal and other horses were sacred to Epona, the horse-goddess. Near Castell Cilan in Gwynedd, North Wales, is a stone embedded in the ground bearing the hoof-print of King Einion's horse. At Llanllyfni in Wales is the hoof-print of the horse of St. Gredfyw. Close to Llyn Barfog in Wales is a hoof-print etched deep into the rock "Carn March Arthur", or the "Stone of Arthur's Horse", which was supposedly made by King Arthur's mount, Llamrai, when it was hauling the terrible Addanc, or "afanc" monster, from the lake. At the Creiqiau Tylwch near Llangurig, Oliver Cromwell is said to have ridden his horse over the precipitous rocks and left behind a hoof print.

Not far from the Devil's Quoit in St. Columb, on the edge of Goss Moor in Cornwall, is a large stone with four deeply impressed marks, known as "King Arthur's Stone". The marks are said to be footprints made by the horse upon which Arthur rode when he resided at Castle an Dinas and hunted on the moors. A Welsh legend has King Arthur pursuing Morgan le Fay, who turns herself into a stone. Arthur's steed leaps across the Bristol Channel, leaving its hoof-prints on a rock.

At Loch Loran in Kilmichael, Argyll and Bute, are five flat stones bearing what may be natural markings improved by light pecking. They lie under water near the inlet at the northern end of the loch and can be best seen in dry weather. Two of the markings are called the "Fairy Footprints", and close behind them are two ovals and several V-hollows suggesting large hoof-prints.

On Loch Etiveside, near Ben Cruachan in Argyll, is the place named "Horseshoes" indicating the stone by the loch's side where the horse belonging to the son of the winter hag (the Cailleach or Carlin) left its hoof-prints as it leapt across an arm of the sea.

At Shielhill Bridge near Memus in Angus, Scotland, a Kelpie's cloven hoof mark is to be seen on a stone in the river.

At Kelso in Roxburgh Street is the outline of a horseshoe where the horse of Prince Charles Edward Stuart cast a shoe as he was riding it through the town on his way to Carlisle in 1745.

Sir Fergus Barclay, Baron of Ardrossan was in league with the devil, and in one of his dealings, he set the task of the devil to make ropes from sand; upon failing to do so, Satan kicked the castle with his hoof and left a hoof-print.

A horse's hoof is carved on a rock at Eggerness in Galloway, Scotland.

At Tedstone Delamere in Herefordshire, England, the Sapey Brook runs its course to Upper Sapey. A mare and a colt had been stolen, and the hoof-prints stopped at the bank of the brook. The owner prayed for their safe return and, upon examining the bed of the brook, saw hoof-prints clearly visible in the rocky bottom. These hoof-prints were followed and, the thief caught, the horses being safely recovered. The nearby Hoar Stone is said to be the horse thief petrified for his crimes. A later version involves Katherine of Ledbury as the owner of the horses.

=== Other animals ===
St Victor Petroglyphs Provincial Park, Saskatchewan, Canada, features footprint petrosomatoglyphs of bison, deer, elk and antelope.

Cattle At South Lopham in Norfolk, England is the Ox-Foot Stone, which previously lay in a meadow still known as the Oxfoot Piece, and bears the supposed imprint of an ox's foot. The legend goes that in a time of great famine, a miraculous cow appeared and provided a never-ending supply of milk to the starving poor. When the famine ceased, the cow struck its hoof against the stone leaving the imprint and then vanished. The stone itself is a flattish slab of sandstone about 60 cm x 90 cm, likely deposited during the last ice age as a Glacial erratic, and the 'hoofprint' is probably the imprint of a fossil bivalve. This part of East Anglia has virtually no naturally occurring stone (local geology being boulder clay with flints overlaid on chalk), so the Stone's very existence would have been notable. The stone now stands outside the door of Oxfootstone Farm House.

A sacred Celtic bull is said to have left its hoof print in a stone "as if it were the softest wax" in a legend relating to Saint Ninian.

St Victor Petroglyphs Provincial Park, Saskatchewan, Canada, contains grizzly bear paw print petroglyphs.

== Mythical and folkloric beings ==
=== Fairies ===
At Loch Loran in Kilmichael, Argyll and Bute, five flat stones bear markings that may be natural features later enhanced by light pecking. The stones lie beneath shallow water near the inlet at the northern end of the loch and are most visible during dry weather. Two of the markings are locally known as the "Fairy Footprints". They measure about 11 inches (28 cm) overall and lie close together, with narrow heels pointing across the loch. The left footprint may have artificially added toes. Nearby are several oval depressions and V-shaped hollows that have been interpreted as resembling large hoof prints.

=== The devil ===
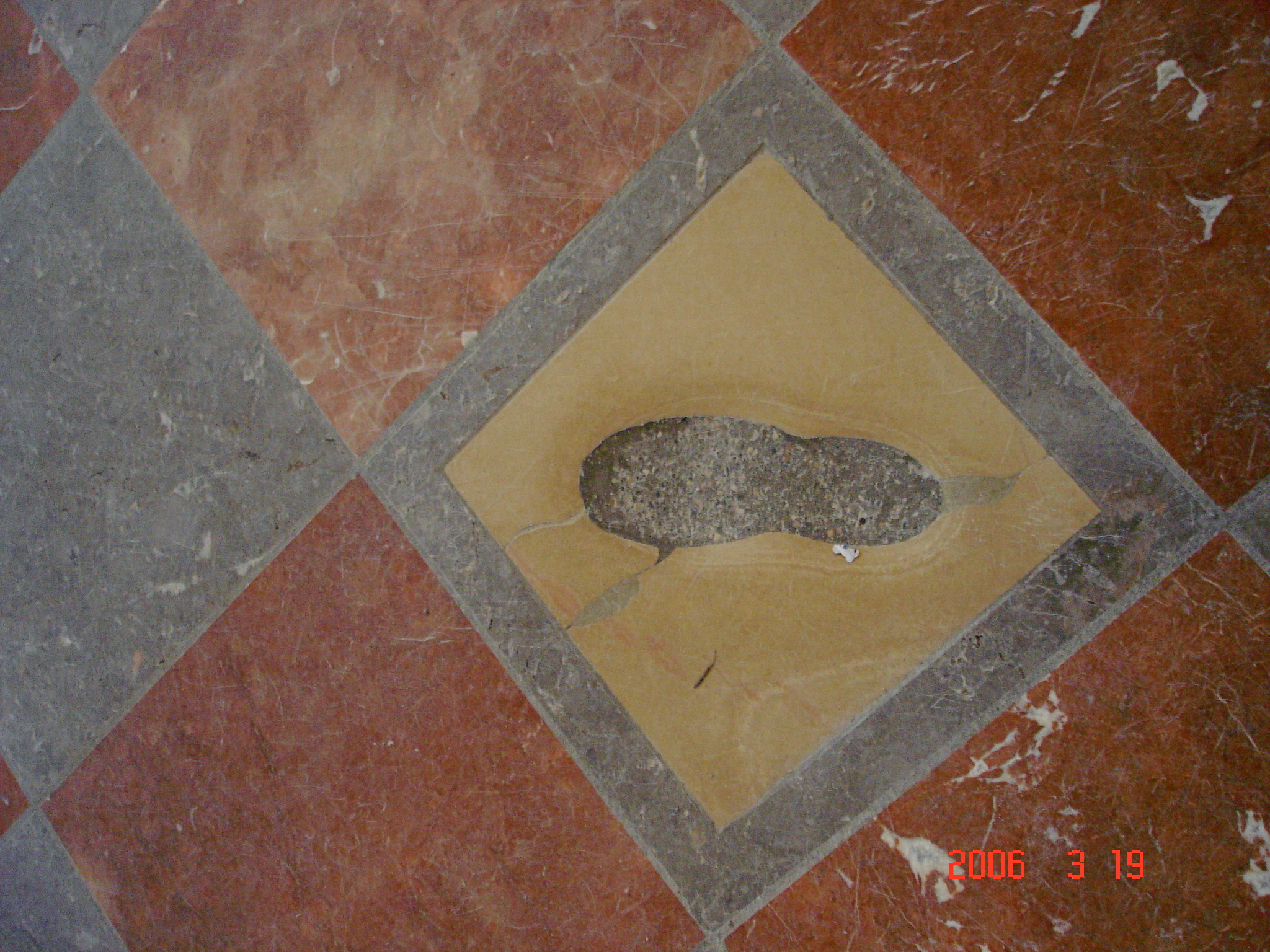
The Devil's Footstep in the Munich Frauenkirche.

At the ruined Kirk of Lady, near Overbister on Sanday, Orkney, are the Devil's Fingermarks, incised as parallel grooves into the parapet of the kirk.

The 'Packstone' is a huge whinstone block to be found at the farm of that name near Muirhead, Shotts, Scotland. The story goes that the magician Michael Scot had relatives in the area and he employed the devil to build a bridge across the Firth of Forth at South Queensferry; however, he fell out with his builder and the devil threw down the 'pack' he was carrying. The marks of his shoulders are still to be seen on the stone.

On the eastern wall of the church of Saint Pancras in the ancient monastery of Saint Augustine outside Canterbury, England, is to be seen the imprint of the devil's talons as he was furious that his heathen temple had become a Christian place of worship. On a coping stone of the Devil's Bridge at Kirkby Lonsdale in Cumbria are the fingermarks of the devil left behind when in his fury at being tricked out of a soul.

At Garry Point on the old Finnart Estate in South Ayrshire, Scotland, a cloven hoof print can be seen embedded in the rock. The legend states that this is the site where the Devil landed when St Patrick kicked him out of Ireland.

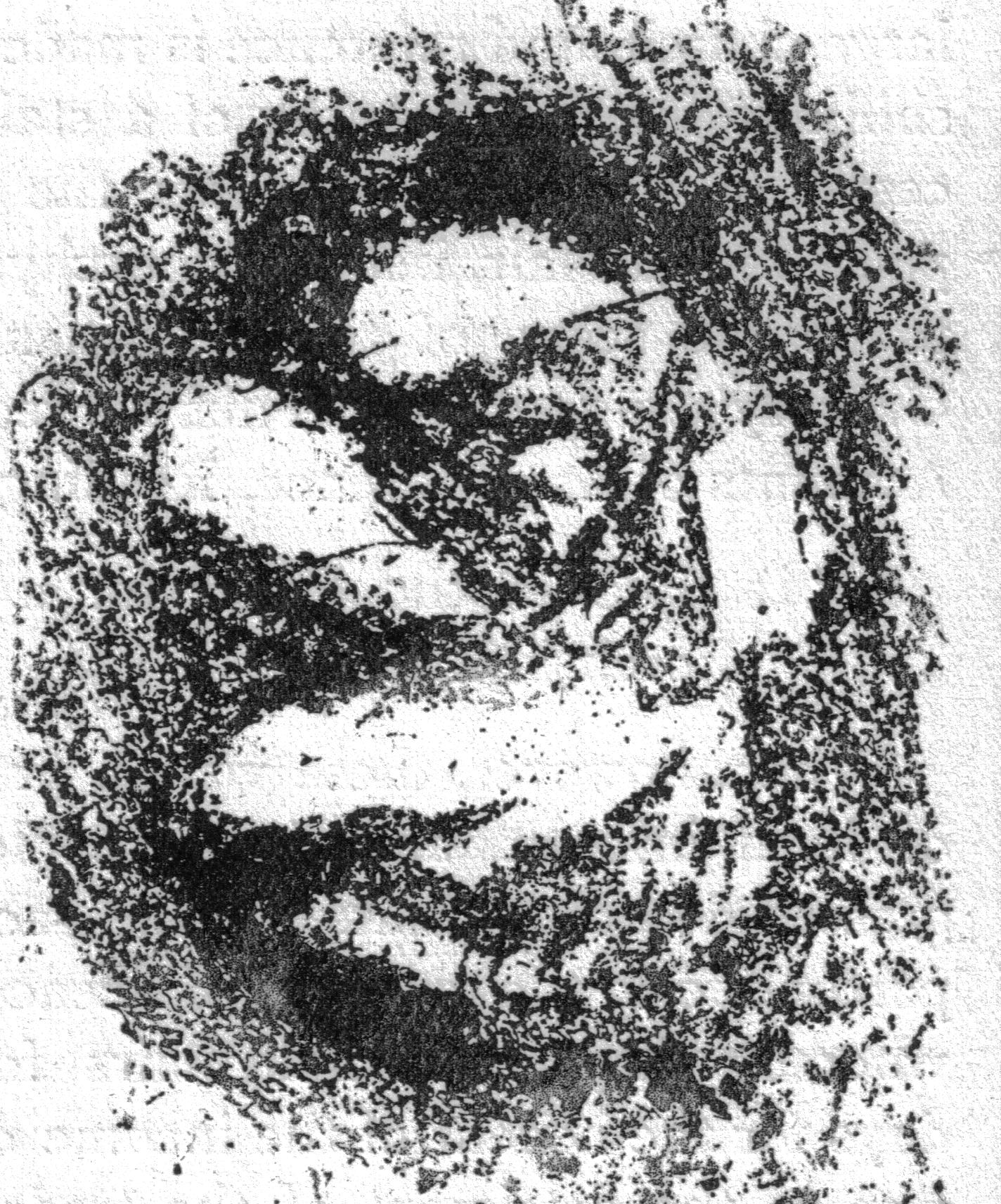
The devil's talons at St Pancras chapel, St Augustine's Abbey, Canterbury.

At the entrance to the Munich Frauenkirche church in Bavaria is the Devil's Footstep or Teufelsschritt. This mark in a tile resembles a footprint, which according to legend was where the devil stood after he had made a deal with the builder to finance construction of the church on the condition that it contain no windows.

The builder managed to trick the devil by siting columns so that the windows were not visible from the spot where the devil stood at the entrance. The devil eventually worked out that he had been tricked, however he could not enter a consecrated church and could only stand in the entrance foyer, stamping his foot furiously, leaving the footprint that remains visible in the church's entrance today. Legend also says the devil then rushed outside and manifested its evil spirit in the wind that furiously rages around the church.

=== Giants ===
On a natural stone in Cornwall is a foot-shaped impression in a rock in the valley leading to the cliffs and coastal footpath near Chapel Porth. It is said to be the foot mark of Giant Bolster of St Agnes legend. Just below the formation, there used to be a Holy Well dedicated to St Agnes, but it dried up due to the mining in the area.

Footprints at North Yell, up Hena, in Shetland were thought to be lost but were rediscovered in 1969 by the ordnance survey. The footprint, 12" by 4", is known locally as the "Wartie" and was used to wash in dew or rainwater, and standing in it was supposed to get rid of warts. In legend, it was made by a giant placing one foot here and the other on the Westing of Unst.

In Bristol, the giants Vincent and Goram dug the Avon gorge and left their footprints.

Moso's Footprint in Samoa was made when the giant Moso stepped over to Samoa from Fiji, and the other footprint can be found on Viti Levu of Fiji. It is a 1 m by 3 m rock enclosure.

At Arthur's Stone chambered tomb in Herefordshire is a "cup mark" stone which bears the imprints of a giant's (or king's) elbow, left behind after he fell dead to the ground, killed by King Arthur.

== Religious leaders, patriarchs and saints ==
=== The Buddha ===
Footprints attributed to the Buddha, often called Buddha footprints or buddhapada, occur at many sites across Asia and date from various historical periods. Japanese researcher Motoji Niwa (丹羽基二, Niwa Motoji) estimated that more than 3,000 examples exist, including about 300 in Japan and more than 1,000 in Sri Lanka.

Many Buddha footprints display symbolic markings, such as a Dharmachakra at the centre of the sole or sets of auspicious signs—commonly 32, 108, or 132—engraved or painted on the footprint.

Buddhist traditions associate some of these footprints with events in the Buddha's life. One tradition holds that the Buddha visited Sri Lanka and left a footprint on Adam's Peak as a sign of the island’s importance in preserving his teachings.

Historical accounts also link such discoveries to political events. During the Tang dynasty, the reported discovery of a large Buddha footprint in Chengzhou was said to have prompted Wu Zetian to proclaim a new reign title in 701 CE known as the Dazu ("Great Foot") era.

Buddha footprints appear in two main forms: natural marks in rock that are interpreted as footprints, and carved representations created by human hands. In Buddhist practice many examples are understood as symbolic representations rather than literal impressions and may function as cetiya (Buddhist relics) and early aniconic representations of the Buddha.

=== Jesus ===
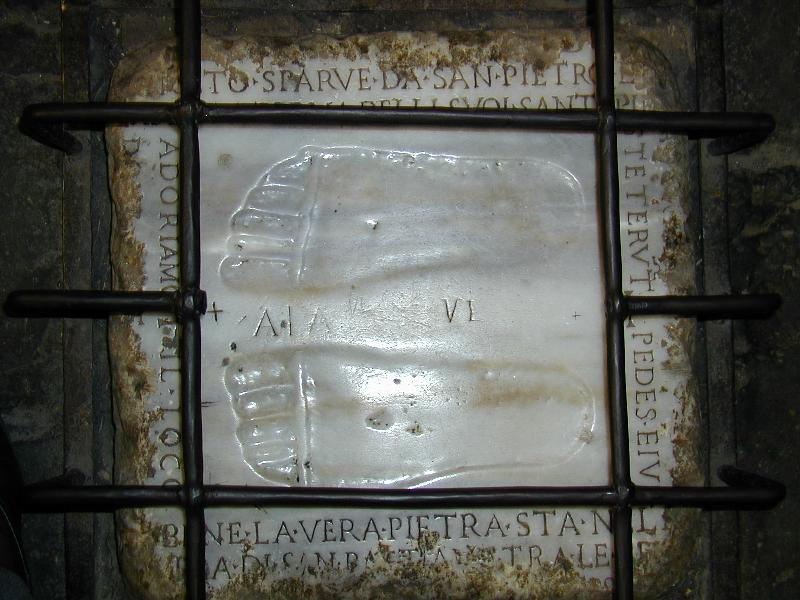
According to legend, these impressions are a copy of the footprints of Jesus at the Church of Domine Quo Vadis, Rome.

At the Chapel of the Ascension in Jerusalem, there are a pair of footprints reputed to be those of Jesus made at the time of his Ascension into heaven. These are sometimes shown in medieval depictions of the Ascension in art.

The church of Saint Sebastian Outside the Walls in Rome houses a stone which, according to tradition, bears the footprints of Jesus when he appeared to Saint Peter on the Appian Way. A copy of these footprints is preserved, as an ex voto offering, at the Church of Domine Quo Vadis, the chapel marking the traditional spot of Jesus' appearance to Peter.

Henry III of England was given a piece of white marble which allegedly carried a trace of one of Jesus' feet, which he had left as a souvenir to his apostles after his Ascension. Henry gave this relic to Westminster Abbey. This may simply have been a votive copy of the footprint in the Chapel of the Ascension.

=== Mary, the mother of Jesus ===
In Wales, the knees and breasts of Mary are said to be imprinted on a rock beside her well at Ffynnon Fair, Llanfair, between Barmouth and Harlech in Gwynedd. Marks said to be her footprint and thumb-print are to be found nearby. Two other Mary footprints are recorded in the vicinity at Llan Maria (St. Mary) near Llanbedr, and Wenallt Hill at Llanaber.

At Stow of Wedale in the Scottish Borders a stone near the Lady's Well and old church of St Mary is said to bear the footprint of the Virgin Mary.

=== Muhammad ===
Footprints attributed to Muhammad are reported in several locations. These include sites associated with the Dome of the Rock in Jerusalem, locations in Damascus, and mosques in West Bengal, Bangladesh, and Gujarat.

== Human petrosomatoglyphs ==
=== Footprints ===
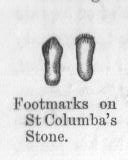
Footprints of Saint Columba at Belmont, Londonderry Road, Ireland

The Romans were accustomed to carve pairs of footprints on a stone with the inscription pro itu et reditu, "for the journey and return". They used them for protective rites on leaving for a journey and for thanksgiving for a safe return, when the traveler would place his feet in the footprints to mark the beginning or end of the undertaking.

Standing on a special stone is a link between the king and the land from which his people earned their food. A similar idea seems to be associated with the Moot hill, or Boot Hill, at Scone, for the latter name comes from an ancient tradition whereby emissaries swore fealty to their king by wearing the earth of their own lands in their foot-bindings or boots.

A Locus terribilis is a sacred place into which only a divine or sacred person could enter. Petrosomatoglyph footprints for the ordination of kings would be an example, for it was believed that only the rightful king was able to use them for the purpose that they were intended.

Footprints may also have to do with the cult of the ancestors, whose spirits dwell in the stone, so that a newly invested King would have received the luck or mana of his predecessors through contact with it.

==== Footprints in Scotland ====
The Clickhimin Broch footprints in Shetland

In Ayr, on the southern bank of the River Ayr is 'Wallace's Heel', a natural sandstone slab from which flows a small spring. Sir William Wallace is said to have left the imprint behind whilst rushing to escape English soldiers who were pursuing him. He later returned to the spring, and dug out a bigger hole to get fresh water for him and his soldiers.

At St. Mary's Church in Burwick, South Ronaldsay, Orkney, is the Ladykirk Stone on which St. Magnus is said to have sailed over the Pentland Firth. It has two clear footprints cut into it.

A pair of footprints is carved in a stone slab in a causeway at the Broch of Clickhimin (or Clickemin), Lerwick, in Shetland. This site was occupied from about 1000 BC to AD 500.

Two footprints are to be found at Dunadd (Dun Monaidh), ancient capital of the Gaelic kingdom of Dál Riata. The completed one faces north and is accompanied by an image of a boar, rock-basins possibly cut for ceremonial ablutions and an ogham inscription. This footprint is said to be that of Oisin or Fergus Mor Mac Erca, the first King of Dalriada, who died in AD 501. St. Columba is said to have installed Aidan as King on this rock. The best preserved footprint is 27 cm long, nearly 11 cm wide, 9 cm across at the heel and 2.5 cm deep; so large that it would fit a foot clothed in a shoe or boot. A second, incomplete footprint is a lightly pecked outline of a shod right foot, 24 cm long and 10 cm in maximum width. It has a pronounced taper to the heel; further internal peck-marks suggest that it was to have been hollowed out. It is on the same alignment as the other footprint.

A crag near the chapel of Keil and St. Columba's Well, between Dunaverty Bay and Carskey in Kintyre, has two footprints carved at a place where St. Columba is reputed to have first set foot in Dalriada, Scotland. One is recent, and the other genuinely old. Kingship rituals may have been connected with this petrosomatoglyph.

St. Columba's footprints are to be found at Southend in Argyll. Two examples exist in Angus.

The caves below Keil Point on the Isle of Arran contain a slab which may have been an ancient altar. It has the prints of two right feet on it, said to be of Saint Columba.

The Giant Fingal of Arran is said to have had a son born in the King's Cave who left a 2-foot-long (0.61 m) footprint on the cave side.

On Islay, there was a Stone of Inauguration by Finlaggan. It was seven feet square and had footprints cut into it. When a chief of the Clan Donald was installed as the King of the Isles, he stood barefoot on the imprints on the stone, and with his father's stone in his hand, was anointed King by the Bishop of Argyll and seven priests. During the ceremony, an orator recited a list of his ancestors and, he was proclaimed "Macdonald, high prince of the seed of Conn". The block was deliberately destroyed in the early seventeenth century.

At Spittal, near Drymen, is a footprint which may be due to natural weathering. It is located at the western end of a long ridge of natural rock outcrop. A quarry for two millstones is nearby.

At Craigmaddie Muir, Baldernock, East Dunbartonshire is the Auld Wives Lifts. This is a complicated assemblage of carvings on a rock platform. On the rock are serpent-like forms, crosses, cups and an impression of the right foot of an adult.

At Dunino Den near St Andrews in Fife, is a footprint and a basin carved in the surface of a sandstone outcrop. A Celtic cross has been carved nearby, possibly as an attempt to Christianise the site.

==== Footprints in Ireland ====
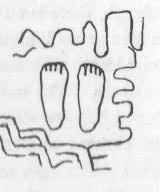
The footprints and associated markings from Arzon Cromlech in Morbihan, Brittany

Close to St. Olann's Well at Coolineagh, near Coachford, County Cork, are the footprints of St. Olann on a boulder.

In the garden of Belmont, on the Greencastle Road, about a mile from Derry, there was, in 1837, a block called St. Columba's Stone with two footprints on it. It may have been the inauguration stone of the kings of Aileach, brought here by the local Chief of Derry.

On the Hill of Lech, or, previously, Mullach Leaght, the "Hill of the Stone", three miles (4.8 km) southwest of Monaghan in Ireland, was the inauguration stone of the Mac Mahons. It was used in 1595 and destroyed by a farm owner in 1809.

At Templemore in County Londonderry is a slab named St. Columbkille's Stone. It has the imprint of two feet, each ten inches (250 mm) in length. Traditionally, it was the inauguration stone of the ancient Irish chieftains.

Saint Columba's Stone near Derry has two depressions like the marks of feet. The O'Doherty's are said to have stood on this stone with bare feet at their inaugurations.

The West Pier in Howth Harbour, Dublin, displays a specimen of footprints from King George IV's visit in 1821.

==== Footprints in England and Wales ====
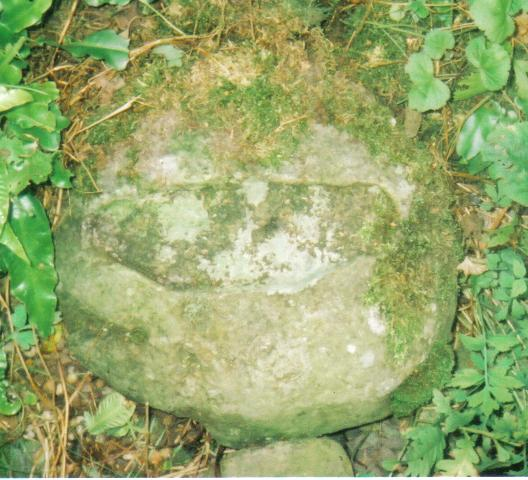
An unclothed footprint on a boulder at Trewithen in Chapeltoun, Ayrshire

"King Arthur's Footprint" is a hollow in the rock at the highest point of Tintagel Island's southern side. It is not entirely natural, having been shaped by human hands at some stage. It may have been used for the inauguration of kings or chieftains as the site is known to have a long history stretching back to the Dark Ages.

At Poole Farm in Somerset, a cist cover was found with footprints and cupmarks. The decorated cist slab is displayed in Bristol Museum. Originally it was in position on the south side of the Pool Farm Cist, which was contained within a round barrow. Excavation revealed the cremated remains of a child and an adult. However, these carvings do have similarities with the Calderstones in Liverpool and others in Scandinavia. The footprinted Calderstones in Liverpool may have come from a Lancashire passage-grave. Sharkey sees a link of artistic influence between these and those at Petit-Mont in Brittany.

On a rock formerly visible at the eastern end of Holyhead church in Anglesey, Wales, was the footprint of St. Cybi.

Kenric's Stone. In the church of St Illtyd at Llanelltyd near Dolgellau stands a stone with a footprint carved upon it. It also has a Latin inscription recording one 'Kenric the Pilgrim.'

==== Footprints in the Isle of Man ====
The Swearing Stone found at Castleward earthwork was probably used in inauguration ceremonies.

==== Footprints in Brittany ====
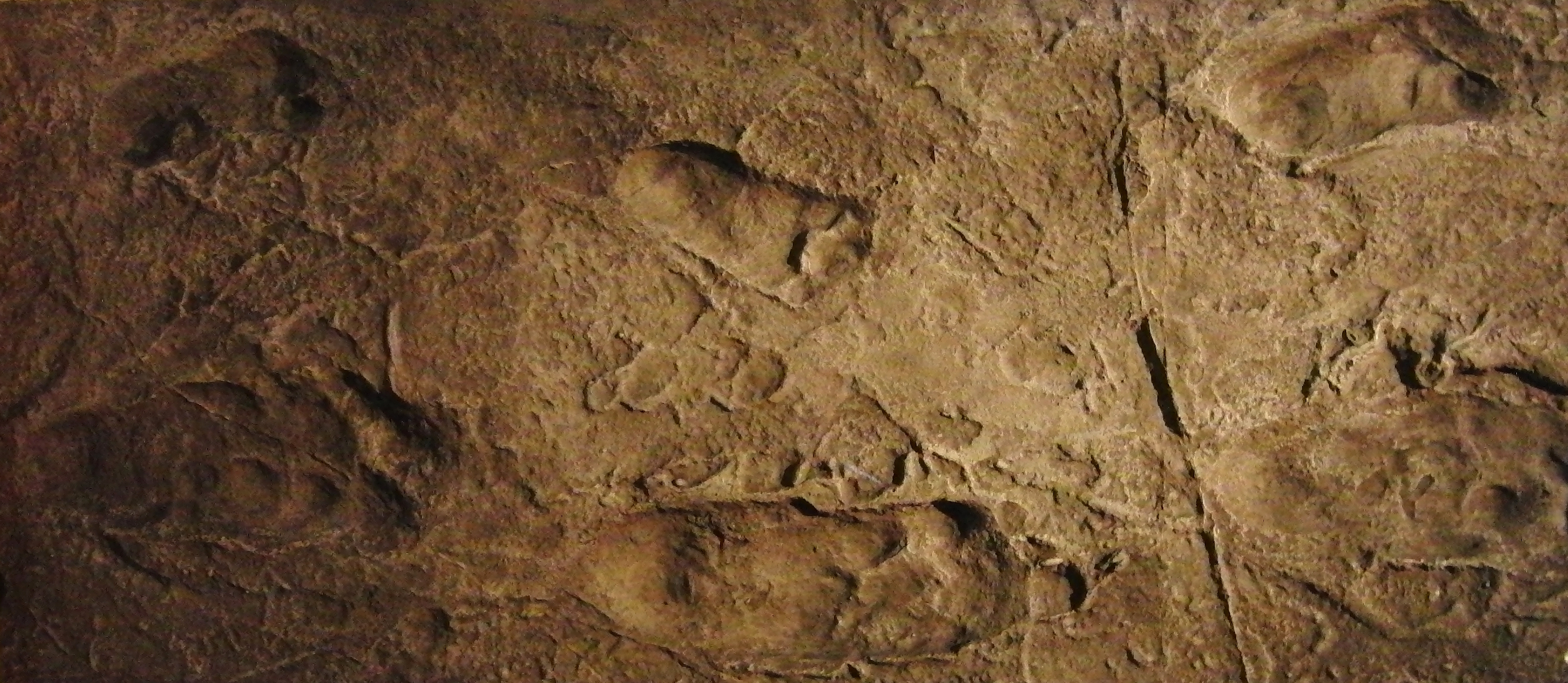
Laetoli footprints replica

A passage-grave at Petit-Mont Arzon in Brittany contains a stone with a pair of feet, toes pointing upwards. Sharkey sees these carvings as coming from the same artistic tradition as those on the Calderstones.

At Petit-Mont passage grave near Arzon in Brittany can be found the relief of two upturned feet.

==== Footprints in Germany ====
- A knight's heel print can allegedly be seen in the sandstone on the terrace of the Heidelberg Castle.

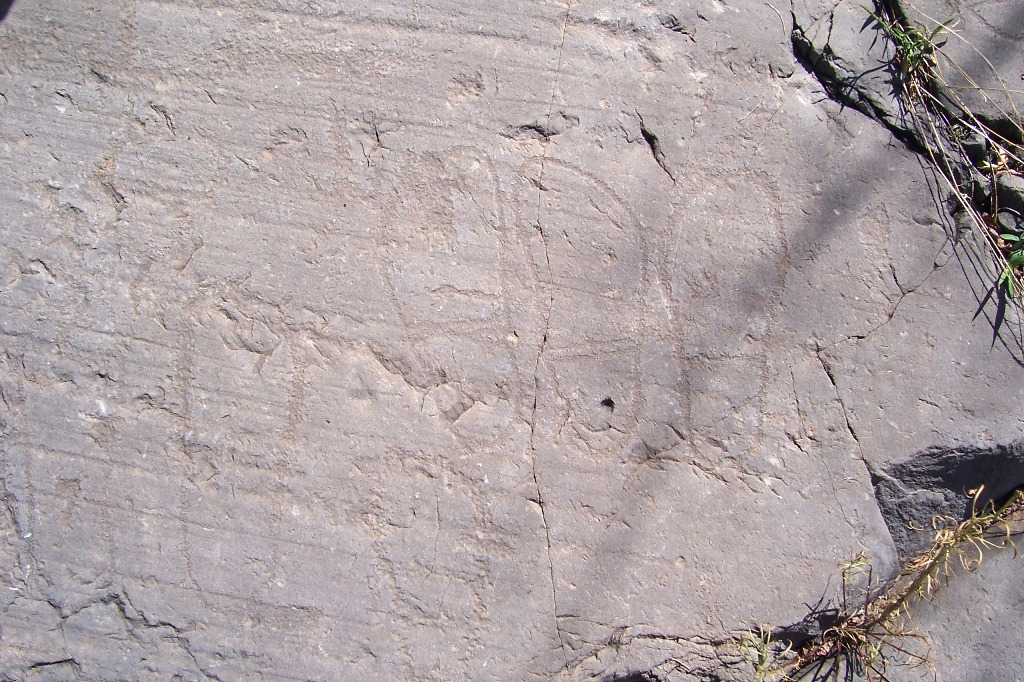
Couples of footprints, Foppe di Nadro (Italy).

==== Footprints in Italy ====
- The petroglyphs of footprints are very common in the Val Camonica rock art (over 200 in the single Rock 6 in Foppe di Nadro area).
- In 2003, a series of footprints, now known as the Ciampate del Diavolo, were discovered on the slopes of Roccamonfina, a dormant volcano about 35 miles (56 km) from Naples. The tracks were left more than 325,000 years ago, during an eruption. They were preserved in the ash. Locals called the prints "devil's trails".ca

==== Footprints in other parts of the world ====
These footprints are associated with figures such as ships, shields and people.

A human-like footprint in volcanic ash was discovered in 1970 during the construction of the Demirköprü Dam in Turkey. The ash was dated as having been deposited about 250,000 years ago.

=== Knee prints ===
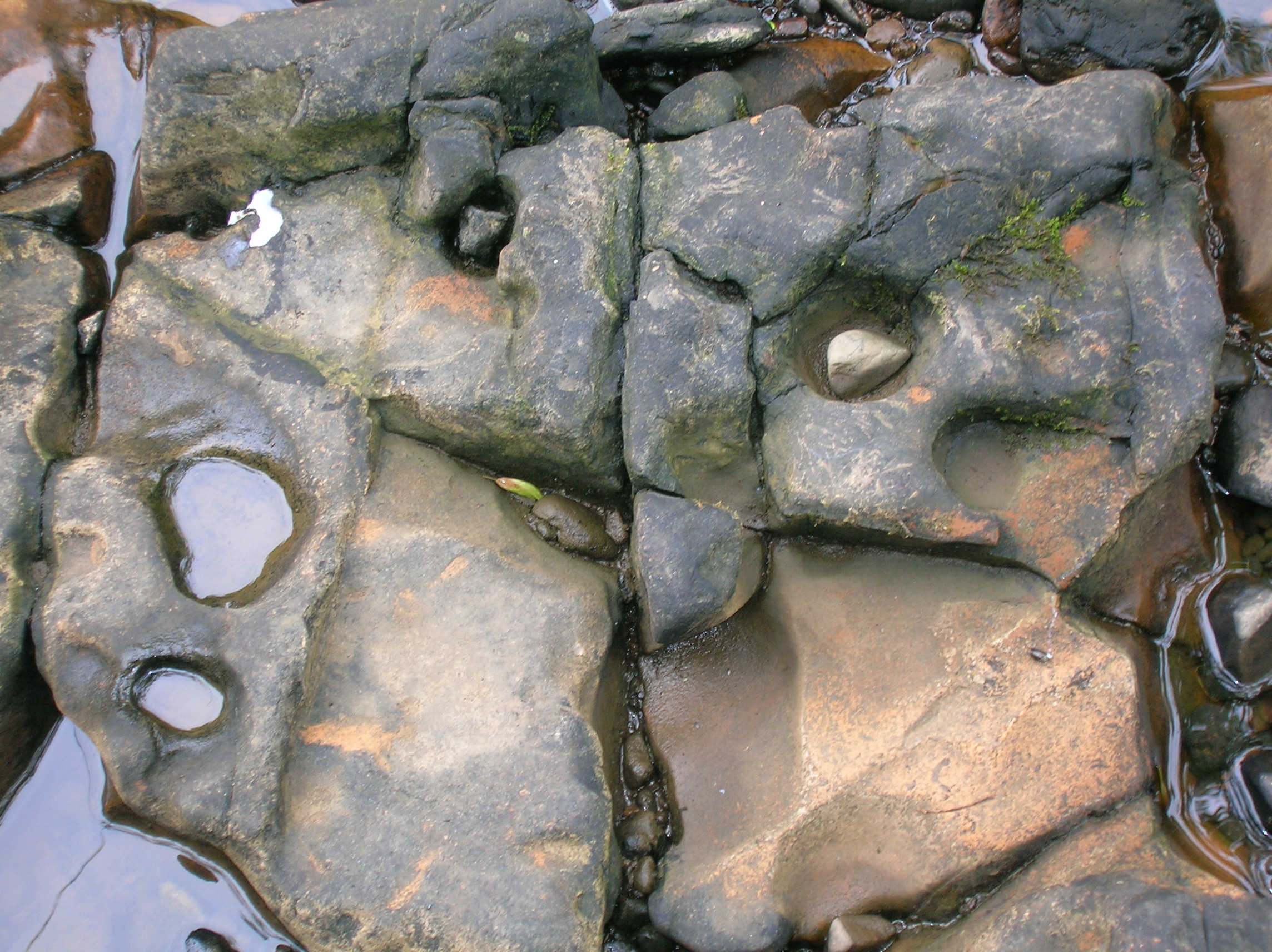
Rock-cut basins in Lynn Glen, North Ayrshire, showing the typical knee print appearance.

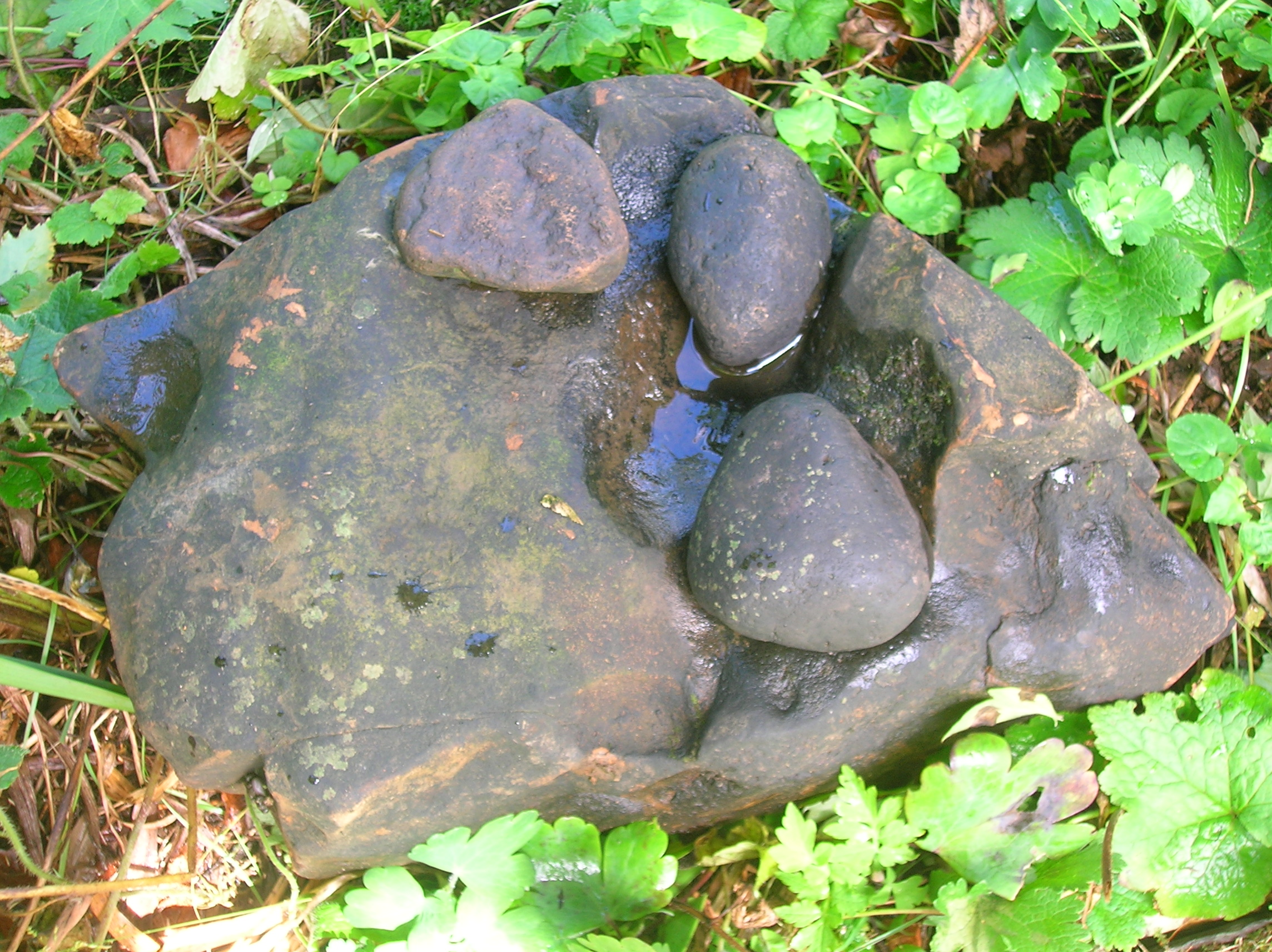
A Bullaun in Chapeltoun, Ayrshire, Scotland.

A tradition of body-part impressions at holy wells, rivers and beneath waterfalls comes from the fact that Celtic monks or culdees often prayed in such places, continuing the veneration of the Druids for sacred waters. Folk belief ascribes healing powers to waters taken from these holy impressions, and this water was used to cure sickness, wounds and sores, as well as preventing or curing sickness in animals such as cattle.

At Llangynnlo in Wales are Olgliniau Cynllo, the knee prints of King Cynllo at prayer. At Troedraur in Dyfed, South Wales are the knee-marks of St. Gwyndaf Hen impressed on a flat rock in the bed of the River Ceri. These are 'pot holes' or Rock-cut basins made by the grinding effect of stone in the river currents to the sceptics. St Cynwyl in the river at Caio in Wales. St. Beuno at Llanaelhaiarn in Wales.

At Arthur's Stone chambered tomb in Hereford & Worcester is a cup-mark stone which bears the imprints of King Arthur's knees left behind after he prayed to God in thanks for victory over a giant (or king) whom he had killed and whose tomb this is. At Llanllyfni in Wales are the knee prints of St. Gredfyw.

=== Hands and arms ===
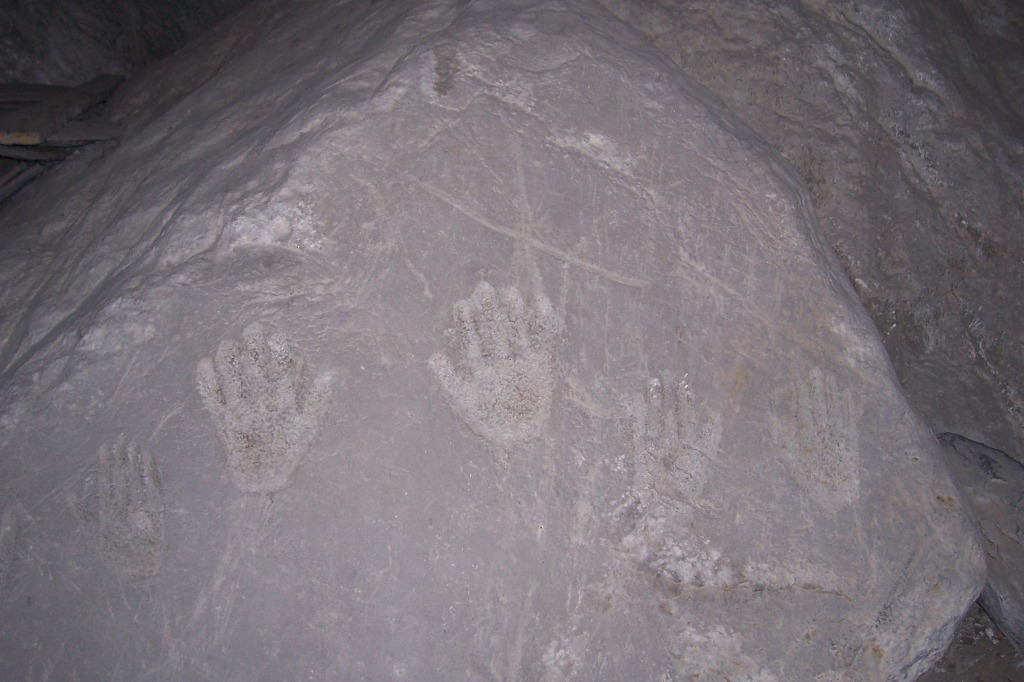
Couples of handprints in the church of S. Faustina and Liberata, Capo di Ponte (Italy)

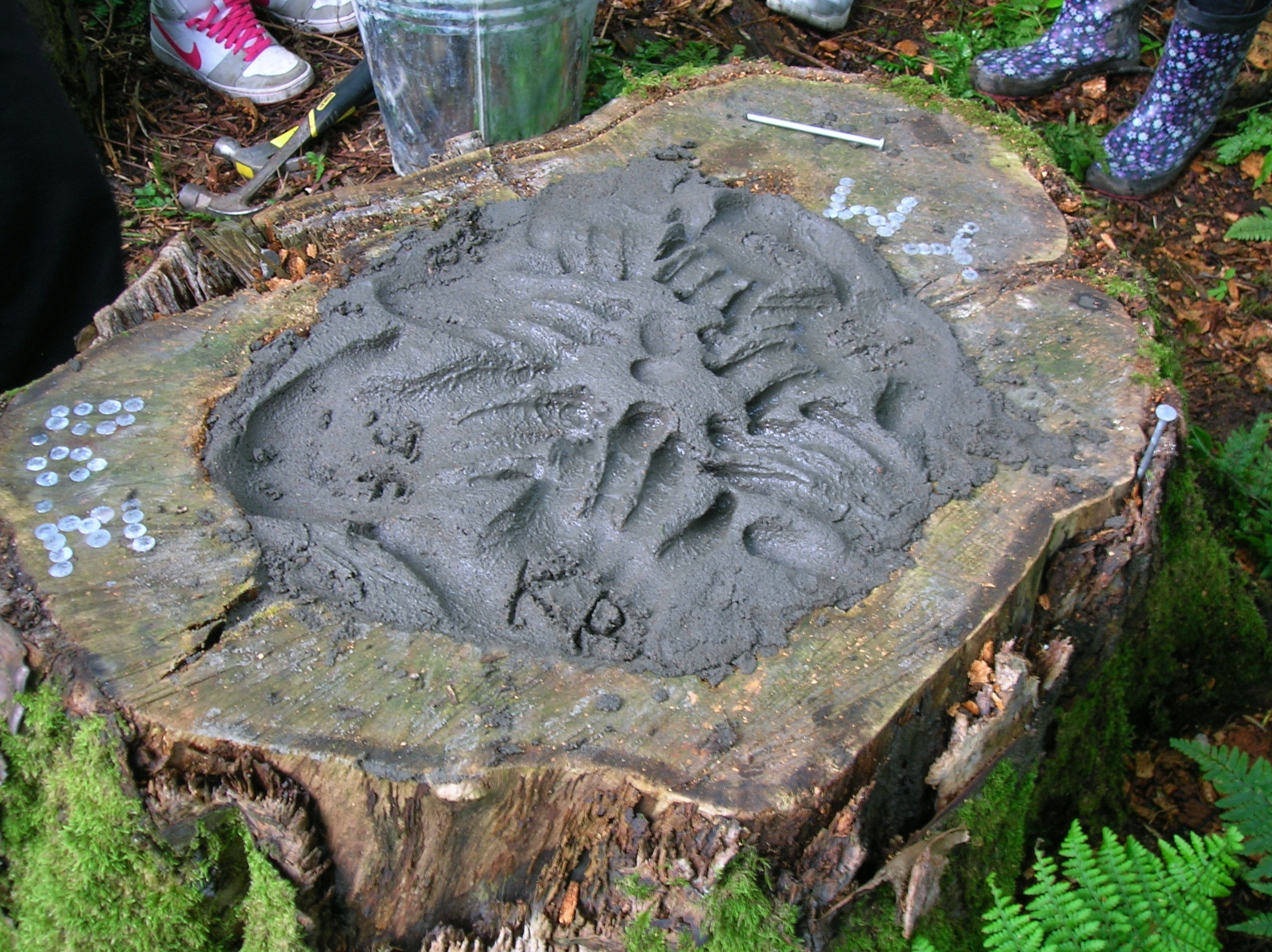
Petrosomatoglyphs in cement at Spier's school

A diminutive pair of hands are carved on a boulder beside the Crinan Canal in Argyll.

The St. Victor's Petroglyphs Provincial Park, in Saskatchewan, Canada, feature hand-prints. From Waldenbuch in Germany is the four-sided Waldenbuch pillar with scroll carving and a left arm and hand.

A carved left hand is to be found on the wall of the Decorated Hall in the Hypogeum of Ħal-Saflieni on Malta. It measures 8¼" by 4".

At Arthur's Stone chambered tomb in Hereford and Worcester is a "cup mark" stone which bears the imprints of a king's or giant's elbow, left behind after he fell dead to the ground, killed by King Arthur.

The Petroglyph National Monument has an estimated 20,000 carved images, including many of hands. These images are inseparable from the cultural landscape, the spirits of the people who created and who appreciate them. At Barnakill near Dunardy in Argyll is a stone bearing two hand prints. The hands appear to have a covering; one may be the back of the hand having interesting designs, the other being the palm with some faint markings.

At Llanllyfni in Wales is the thumb print of St. Gredfyw.

Near Strathpeffer in Scotland is the finger and thumb print of a dwarf associate of Finn Mac Cuill on an old gate post near to the Pictish Eagle Stone.

In Argyll and Bute, Kilneuair's kirk has inside, to the east of the nave door, a sandstone block bearing a now almost invisible five-toed print with nails on three of the toes and which is referred to as 'the Devil's hand'. The story goes that a local tailor did not believe in the Devil and Old Nick appeared as a skeleton just missing the man and scratching the wall with his bone hand.

=== Eyes ===
At St. Mary's Church in Newchurch-in-Pendle, an eye is carved on the tower, said to be the all-seeing eye of God. Local tradition says that it was originally placed there to protect the worshippers from the witches who once plagued the district.

In Almería, Spain, is a carved limestone pillar with eyes or the oculos / oculi motif. The eyes have eyebrows and/or accentuating arcs. An "eye goddess" may have existed as shown by many other examples of carved oculi.

The Folkton "drums" are made of chalk and are elaborately carved, with distinct oculi or eyes.

Petrospheres or carved stone balls from Scotland, especially the Aberdeen area, often have concentric carved lines, some of which appear to be stylised oculi.

Pecked carvings of "eyebrows" are found on a lintel inside Holm of Papa Westray south chambered cairn, Orkney. They are similar to the 'owlish' eyes and eyebrows carved on the Folkton Drums.

The Food-vessel peoples at the Tregulland barrow near Bodmin Moor in Cornwall had placed slate slabs around the central burial bearing circular pecked hollows resembling oculi, presumably having a protective function for the person buried within.

=== Heads ===
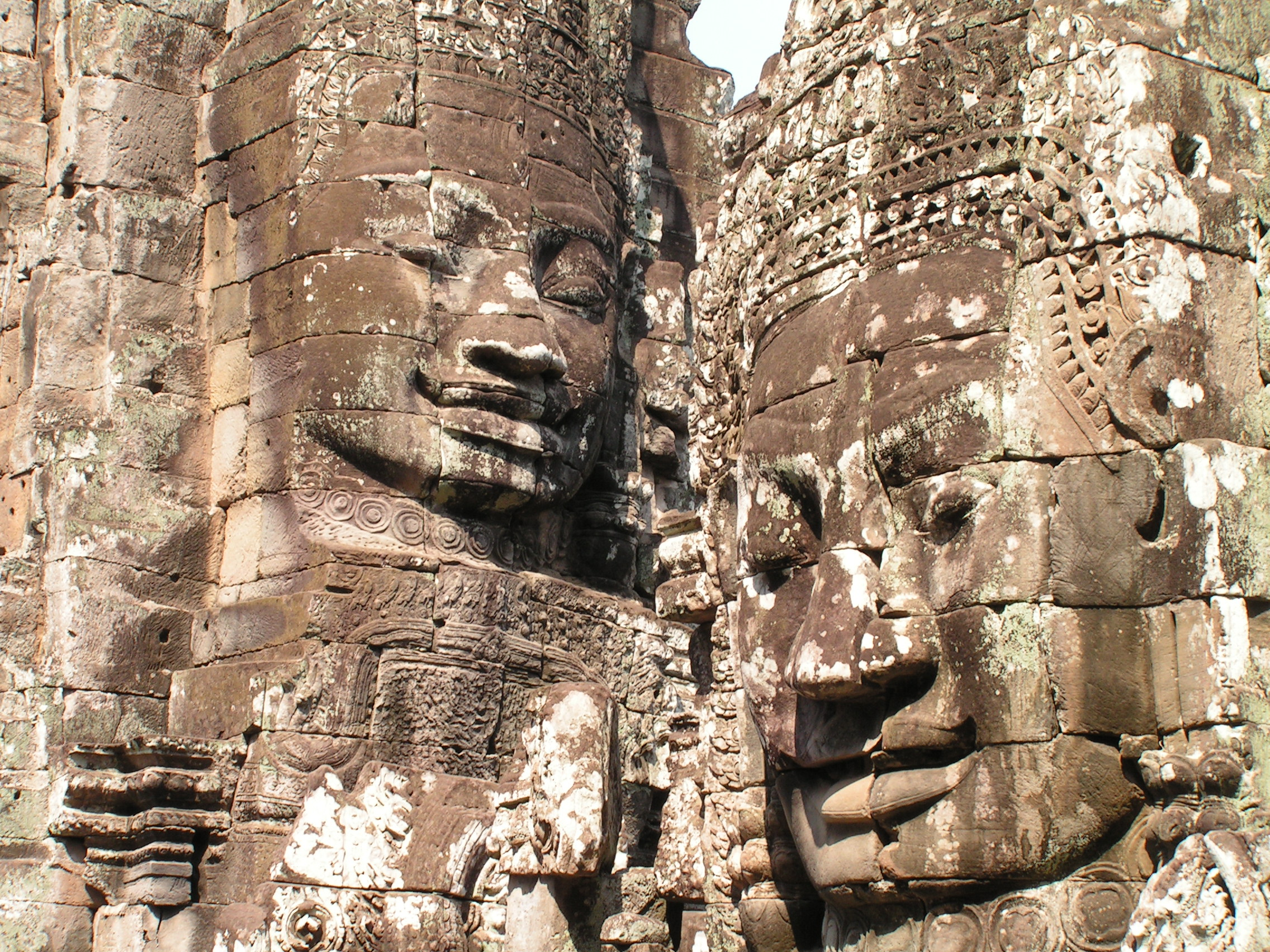
Heads of Khmer kings atop Angkor Wat Hindu-Buddhist temples of Cambodia.

Sikhara top of Bayon at Angkor Wat complex are carved in the image of Hindu-Buddhist Khmer kings.

The Celts are well known for their cult of the "severed head" of which many examples exist as three-dimensional carvings or sculptures. Petrosomatoglyphs are much rarer. Pump Sant Stone near Carmarthen in Wales has the imprint in it of the heads of the five saints, named Ceitho, Celynnin, Gwyn, Gwyno and Gwynoro. The stone is made of Diorite, a very hard stone brought from another district. It stands on a mound facing the Ogofau Lodge of Dolaucothi House, near to the Roman Gold Mines. It has depressions on all four faces characteristic of the wear produced from crushing quartz.

The Serpent Stone from a Roman cemetery in Maryport in Cumbria has a Celtic severed head wearing a torc carved on the top of a phallic-shaped pillar. On the back is a carving of a serpent.

At Tarren Deusant, Llantrisant in Mid-Glamorgan is a pagan site with two heads originally carved, showing incised eyebrows and slit mouths characteristic of some Celtic cult heads. Six other heads have been carved since 1696, when they were first recorded.

The Husjatyn god-pillar from the River Zbrucz in Galicia, Poland, has several heads carved on its four sides, together with images of horses, people and weapons.

A pointed stone from Rottenburg am Neckar, at Stammheim in Stuttgart, has a rudimentary human face carved on it. From Entremont, Bouches-du-Rhône in France is a four-sided stone pillar with numerous engraved stone heads. The pillar came from the Celtic sanctuary which was destroyed by the Romans in 124 BC.

At Alderly Edge, Cheshire, England, is the face of Merlin carved into the native rock face of a crag.

Two carved stone heads are located at Chapelhall House, Innellan, Argyll. One resembles a Celtic stone head and may indeed be one, the other is more likely to have been a corbel in the early medieval chapel that lay nearby.

St. Aid, or Áed mac Bricc, was Bishop of Killare in the 6th century. At Saint Aid's birth, his head had hit a stone, leaving a hole that collected rainwater that cured all ailments, thus linking it with the Irish tradition of Bullaun stones.

On the Victorian viaduct in the Pass of Killiecrankie is a well-defined face carved into one ashlar block.

Saint Aid or Áed mac Bricc was Bishop of Killare in 6th-century. At Saint Aid's birth his head had hit a stone, leaving a petrosomatoglyph type hole in which collected rainwater that cured all ailments, identifying it also with the Irish tradition of Bullaun stones and possible links to cup and ring mark stones.

=== The female form and reproductive structures ===
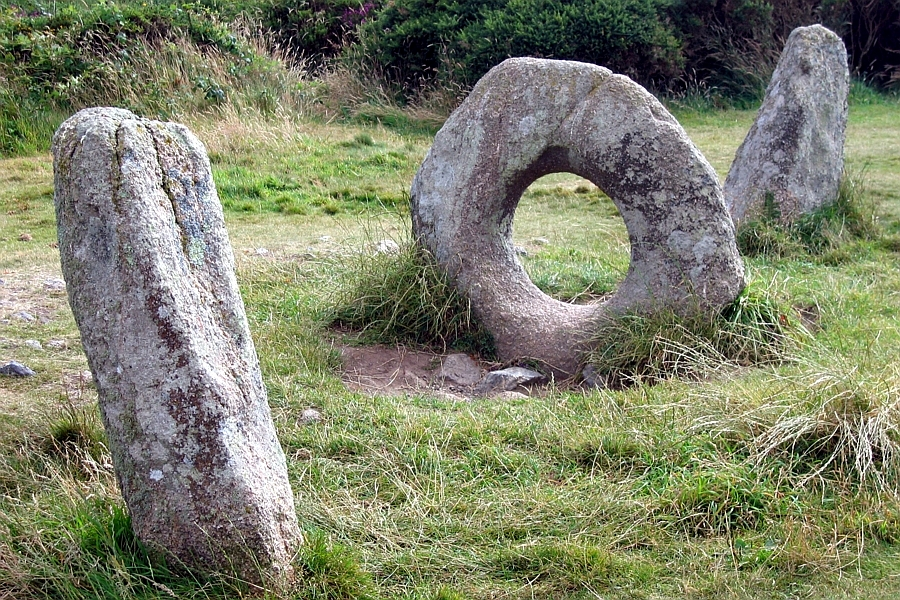
Mên-an-Tol, Cornwall, UK

It has been stated that many of the signs or symbols which accompany maze or geometric patterns from sites such as Newgrange in Ireland are identifiable or interpretable as human, the womb (lens symbol), the pubic area (lozenge symbol), fallopian horns (ram's horns), the female form (hour-glass symbol), breasts (w or omega symbol), etc. The vesica piscis shape as found on the lid of the Chalice Well at Glastonbury includes an almond- or lozenge-shaped central area that is seen as a possible representation of the female genitals. Meehan does not, however, clearly indicate his sources for these interpretations.

In the gallery-grave of Kerguntuil at Tregastel in Brittany are nine pairs of breasts above engraved necklaces.

Barclodiad y Gawres is a passage-grave on Anglesey with its internal surfaces decorated with lozenges, chevrons, wavy lines and spirals. The whole tomb has been likened to a womb, that of the Mother Goddess. These symbols are also commonly used in passage graves found in Ireland and Brittany. Triangular stones are sometimes regarded as being representations of the female sexual organs or overall body shape. At Boscawen un stone circle in Cornwall, a leaning central standing stone and a large white quartz boulder may represent the male and female elements of nature. At Carn Euny Iron Age village in Cornwall is a fogou which may represent the womb of the Great Earth Mother.

At Avebury and West Kennet Avenue in Wiltshire, the tall pillar and "broad diamond shape" stones were used alternately in the stone circles, possibly symbolising males and females at this famous pagan ritual site. Stoney Littleton Long Barrow near Bath has been likened to a "womb-tomb" of the Great Goddess who awaited the return of the sun.

Tolmen stones, such as the example on the North Teign river on Dartmoor, England, are said to derive their name from the Cornish tol ("hole") and maen ("stone") and were thought to have been used by Druids for purification and that the wrongdoer was lowered through into the water for lustration, a purification rite or cleansing ritual. The hole in the stone represented the female birth canal in the Druid or pagan mind, and by passing through it, a person was symbolising the act of rebirth and therefore regaining innocence or being cleansed of post-parturition illness, etc.

=== Male reproductive structures ===
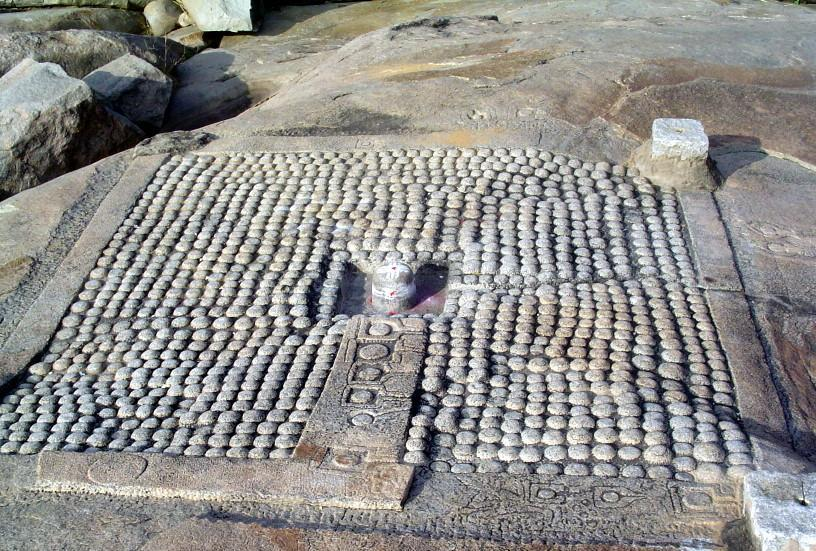
Thousand Shivalingas at Hampi in India.

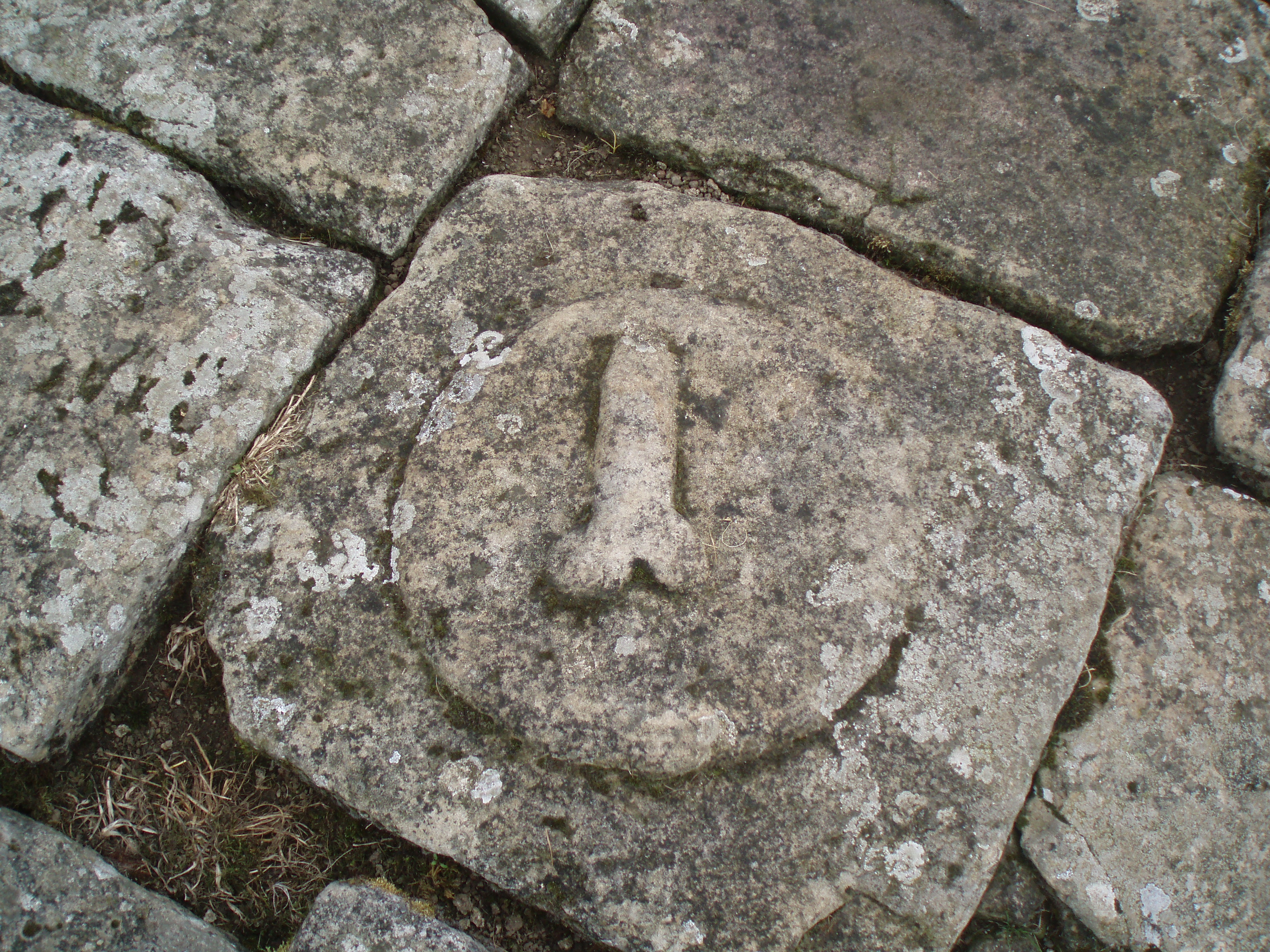
Phallic petrosomatoglyph at Cilurnum Roman Fort, Chesters (Humshaugh), England

Shivalinga is carved in numerous Hindu temples across Indian subcontinent and southeast Asia, including in Angkor Wat, rock-cut temples in India such as Aihole, Ajanta Caves, Amarnath Temple, Badami cave temples, Ellora Caves, Gavi Gangadhareshwara Temple, Hampi, Hulimavu Shiva cave temple, Mahabalipuram, Masroor Rock Cut Temple, Udaygiri Caves, Vaishno Devi, etc.

Many references have been made to the obviously phallic appearance of standing stones. It is suggested that they may serve as stylised representations of the phallus, the purpose of which is to magically enhance the fertility of humans, animals and crops. A number of practices which are supposed to give fertility to barren women are linked to standing stones throughout Europe. At Avebury and West Kennet Avenue in Wiltshire, the tall pillar and broad diamond shape stones were used alternately in the stone circles, possibly symbolising males and females at these famous pagan ritual sites. At Boscawen un stone circle in Cornwall, a leaning central standing stone and a large white quartz boulder may represent the male and female elements of nature. The Maypole is often considered a phallic symbol, coinciding with the worship of Germanic phallic figures such as that of Freyr.

Phallic fertility symbols were carved for good luck, and they were also a powerful antagonist to the evil eye. The Romans regularly carved them onto military buildings, and Hadrian's Wall has several at Chesters and Housesteads forts. One at Barcombe Hill shows a crude phallus and testicles with the legs of a chicken. In Portugal, phalli are represented together with cup-marks, zig-zags, straggly-lines, etc., on the ninety or so stones of the 4000-year-old Cromeleque dos Almendres near Évora. At Valhaugen in Norway a realistic representation of a phallus has been found and restored.

== Recent and modern petrosomatoglyphs ==
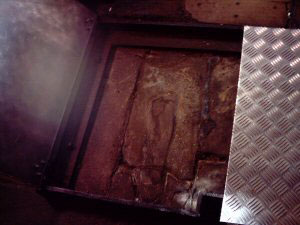
This footprint is said to be made by Protestant martyr George Marsh.

Located at Smithills Hall, near Bolton in Lancashire, is the impressed footprint at the bottom of a set of stairs of George Marsh, a Protestant martyr. In 1555, Marsh was interrogated at Smithills Hall and then taken to Boughton in Cheshire and burnt at the stake for the sake of his faith. It is said that the footprint is a divine reminder of this unjust persecution and murder.

== See also ==
- Buddhapada – Monument marking or symbolizing an imprint of Gautama Buddha's foot or both feet
- Bullaun – Depression in a stone which fills with water
- Carved stone balls – Petrospheres from late Neolithic Scotland
- Chicago rat hole – Rat-shaped hole in a Chicago sidewalk
- Cup and ring mark – Form of prehistoric art
- Flag – Piece of fabric with a distinctive design and colours
- Folklore – Expressive culture shared by particular groups
- Megalith – Large stone used to build a structure or monument
- Menhir – Large upright stone placed by humans
- Moot hill – Assembly place in early medieval Britain
- Pareidolia – Perception of meaningful patterns or images in random or vague stimuli
- Rock art – Human-made markings on natural stone
- Rock-cut basin – Cylindrical depression cut into stream or river beds
- Sieidi – Sami cultural item
- Sledovik – Sacred stones in Slavic and Finnic cultures
- Stone ball – Spherical man-made artifact composed of stone
- Trace fossil – Geological record of biological activity
