= List of shipwrecks in January 1856 =

The list of shipwrecks in January 1856 includes ships sunk, foundered, grounded, or otherwise lost during January 1856.

== 1 January ==
List of shipwrecks: 1 January 1856
| Ship | State | Description |
|---|---|---|
| Chatsworth | United States | African slave trade: The brigantine was destroyed on the coast of Africa by HMS Hecate (Royal Navy). Her crew escaped. |
| Helen Maria | United Kingdom | The ship was wrecked in the Abaco Islands, Bahamas. She was on a voyage from Bristol, Gloucestershire to Cuba. |
| Henrys | United Kingdom | The ship was wrecked at Málaga, Spain. |
| Melissa | United Kingdom | The ship was driven ashore on Horn Island, Mississippi, United States. She was on a voyage from Greenock, Renfrewshire to Mobile, Alabama, United States. She had been destroyed by fire by 12 February. |
| Pekin | United Kingdom | The brig was destroyed by fire in the Atlantic Ocean 25 nautical miles (46 km) south south west of Cape St. Vincent, Portugal. Her crew were rescued. She was on a voyage from Messina, Sicily to the Clyde. The wreck subsequently came ashore at Aljezur, Portugal. |

== 2 January ==
List of shipwrecks: 2 January 1856
| Ship | State | Description |
|---|---|---|
| Arundel | United Kingdom | The ship was sighted whilst on a voyage from Calcutta, India to Bordeaux, Gironde, France. No further trace, presumed foundered with the loss of all hands. |
| Bee | United Kingdom | The schooner ran aground at North Shields, County Durham. |
| Harmony | United Kingdom | The brig was driven ashore at Bacton, Norfolk. She was refloated with assistance of a tug and towed in to Lowestoft, Suffolk in a severely leaky condition. |
| Maria | Denmark | The ship was wrecked on the Holmeshaven Reef. She was on a voyage from Leith, Lothian, United Kingdom to Præstø. |
| Mary Ann | United Kingdom | The schooner was wrecked west of Port Soderick, Isle of Man. Her crew survived. She was on a voyage from Dublin to Barrow-in-Furness, Lancashire. |

== 3 January ==
List of shipwrecks: 3 January 1856
| Ship | State | Description |
|---|---|---|
| Angostura | United States | The ship departed from New York for Queenstown, County Cork, United Kingdom. No further trace, presumed foundered in the Atlantic Ocean with the loss of all hands. |
| Emmaus | United Kingdom | The sloop ran aground at Aberlady, Lothian. She was on a voyage from Leith to Aberlady. She was refloated and put back to Leith in a severely damaged condition. |
| Siddons | United Kingdom | The ship was wrecked on the Grecian Shoal, off the coast of Florida, United States. Her crew were rescued. She was on a voyage from Liverpool, Lancashire to New Orleans, Louisiana. |
| Veracity | United Kingdom | The ship ran aground on the Newcombe Sand, in the North Sea off the coast of Suffolk. She was on a voyage from Newcastle upon Tyne, Northumberland to London. She was refloated and taken in to Lowestoft, Suffolk in a leaky condition. |

== 4 January ==
List of shipwrecks: 4 January 1856
| Ship | State | Description |
|---|---|---|
| Conqueror | United Kingdom | The tug struck sunken wreckage and sank at Sunderland, County Durham. Her crew were rescued. |
| Dædalus | United Kingdom | The brig ran aground and sank at Kazatch, Russia. She was on a voyage from Balaklava to Kazatch. |
| Kelsick Wood | United Kingdom | The brig was driven ashore and wrecked at Saffee, Morocco with the loss of either two of her crew or all but two of her crew. |

== 5 January ==
List of shipwrecks: 5 January 1856
| Ship | State | Description |
|---|---|---|
| Henry | United Kingdom | The ship was driven ashore and wrecked near Cimbritshamn, Sweden. She was on a voyage from Pillau, Prussia to Hull, Yorkshire. |
| Kalama | United States | The steamship was wrecked in the Sandwich Islands. |
| Mathilda Luckie | United Kingdom | The ship was driven ashore on Eierland, North Holland, Netherlands and was abandoned by her crew. She was on a voyage from North Shields, County Durham to Demerara, British Guiana. |
| Mayflower | United States | The schooner capsized in the Atlantic Ocean (37°30′N 75°00′W) with the loss of four of her seven crew. Survivors were rescued on 17 January by Batacola (United States). Mayflower was on a voyage from Georgetown, South Carolina to Boston, Massachusetts. |
| Seminole | Unknown | The steamer caught fire at a pier in the St. Johns River off Jacksonville, Florida. Cut loose to prevent the fire from spreading to nearby buildings, she drifted downstream ablaze and collided with the survey schooner USCS Benjamin Peirce ( United States Coast Survey), damaging Benjamin Peirce and setting her afire, although Benjamin Peirce′s crew quickly extinguished the fire. The burning Seminole then drifted toward the brig Iza (flag unknown), which avoided her. |
| St. Denis | France | The full-rigged ship foundered in the Atlantic Ocean 130 nautical miles (240 km) east of Sandy Hook, New Jersey, United States with the loss of 39 of the 50 people on board. Survivors were rescued by Naples (Flag unknown). She was on a voyage from New York, United States to Havre de Grâce, Seine-Inférieure. |
| Tejuca | United States | The clipper foundered in the Atlantic Ocean. Her crew were rescued by Excelsior (United States). Tejuca was on a voyage from New York to Queenstown, County Cork, United Kingdom. |

== 6 January ==
List of shipwrecks: 6 January 1856
| Ship | State | Description |
|---|---|---|
| Adams | United Kingdom | The ship was wrecked at "Juhumbum", Africa with the loss of thirteen of her crew. She was on a voyage from Moulmein, Burma to London. |
| Aglaë Rosa | France | The schooner foundered in the Atlantic Ocean off Chipiona, Spain. Her crew survived. She was on a voyage from Cartagena, Spain to Rouen, Seine-Inférieure. |
| Elvira | Spain | The brigantine was wrecked on the Splough Rock, off Greenore, County Louth, United Kingdom. Her crew were rescued. She was on a voyage from Liverpool, Lancashire, United Kingdom to Havana, Cuba. |
| Leonor | Portugal | The barque sank at São Jorge Island, Azores with the loss of all but her captain, who was ashore. |
| Marie Louise | France | The brigantine was wrecked off Cape Trafalgar, Spain. Her crew were rescued. She was on a voyage from Cette, Hérault to Gibraltar and Casablanca, Morocco. |
| Mary Green | United Kingdom | The ship was abandoned in the Atlantic Ocean. Her crew were rescued by the barque Sacsuga (United States). Mary Green was on a voyage from Liverpool to Philadelphia, Pennsylvania, United States. |
| Sarah | (United Kingdom of Great Britain and Ireland) British North America | The schooner was abandoned in the Atlantic Ocean. Her crew were rescued by RMS Asia (United Kingdom). |
| Standard | United Kingdom | The brig was wrecked at Isla Cristina, Spain. Her crew were rescued. She was on a voyage from Alexandria, Egypt to Cádiz, Spain and Cork. |

== 7 January ==
List of shipwrecks: 7 January 1856
| Ship | State | Description |
|---|---|---|
| Anna | United Kingdom | The schooner was driven ashore at Bolonia, Spain. |
| Camois Segundo | Portugal | The schooner was driven ashore near La Cortadura, Spain. |
| Cheshire | United Kingdom | The ship was wrecked near Tarifa, Spain. Her crew were rescued. She was on a voyage from Callao, Peru to Valencia, Spain. |
| Condor | Duchy of Holstein | The ship was driven ashore on Justøy, Norway. |
| Delta | United Kingdom | The ship was wrecked on the Seal Rock, off the coast of County Sligo. Her crew were rescued. She was on a voyage from Liverpool, Lancashire to Sligo. |
| Ellen | United Kingdom | The brig was driven ashore at Gibraltar. |
| Federica | Spain | The schooner was driven ashore at Gibraltar. |
| Graciosa Fanny | Kingdom of Sardinia | The brig was driven ashore at Gibraltar. She was on a voyage from Buenos Aires, Argentina to Marseille, Bouches-du-Rhône, France. |
| Jeune Nanon | France | The schooner was driven ashore at Tarifa, Spain with the loss of three of her seven crew. She was on a voyage from Adra, Spain to Nantes, Loire-Inférieure. |
| Juniatta | United States | The barque was driven ashore at Fort St Phillip, Menorca, Spain. |
| Juvenile | (United Kingdom of Great Britain and Ireland) British North America | The barque was driven ashore at Gibraltar. |
| Maria | Grand Duchy of Mecklenburg-Schwerin | The brig was driven ashore and wrecked at Gibraltar. Her crew were rescued. |
| Orynthia | United Kingdom | The barque foundered in the Atlantic Ocean (35°40′N 29°02′W). Her crew were rescued by the barque General de Stuers (Netherlands). Orynthia was on a voyage from Demerara, British Guiana to Sunderland, County Durham. |
| Petrel | United Kingdom | The brig was driven ashore at Gibraltar. |
| Prosperité | France | The brig was driven ashore at Gibraltar. She was on a voyage from Gijón to Adra, Spain. |
| Providence | United Kingdom | The brig was driven into the brig Tyro (United Kingdom) and then drove ashore at Gibraltar. She had been refloated by 5 February. |
| Rhoda | United Kingdom | The brig was driven ashore at Gibraltar. |
| Saint Esprit | France | The brigantine was driven ashore and wrecked at Tarifa, Spain. |
| St. Nicholas | (Ottoman Empire) Ottoman Syria | The brig was driven ashore at Gibraltar. |
| Thomas Ritchie | United States | The ship was abandoned in the Atlantic Ocean. Her crew were rescued by Charles William (United States). Thomas Ritchie was on a voyage from New York to Dordrecht, South Holland, Netherlands. |
| Tyro | United Kingdom | The brig was driven out to sea from Gibraltar. |
| Yarmouth | United States | The barque was driven ashore at Gibraltar. She was on a voyage from Venice, Kingdom of Lombardy–Venetia to New York. |
| Zephyretta | United Kingdom | The schooner was abandoned in the Atlantic Ocean (43°15′N 12°00′W). Her crew were rescued by the barque Sea (United Kingdom). Zephyretta was on a voyage from Cádiz, Spain to London. |

== 8 January ==
List of shipwrecks: 8 January 1856
| Ship | State | Description |
|---|---|---|
| Atwick | United Kingdom | The barque was abandoned in the Mediterranean Sea 80 nautical miles (150 km) north west of Alexandria, Egypt and was presumed to have subsequently foundered. Her crew were rescued by the barque Hampshire (United Kingdom). Atwick was on a voyage from Alexandria to Liverpool, Lancashire. |
| Blanca | Spain | The full-rigged ship was driven ashore and wrecked at Conil de la Frontera with the loss of 26 lives. She was on a voyage from Conil de la Frontera to Havana, Cuba. |
| Cecilia | United Kingdom | The barque ran aground on the Corton Sand, in the North Sea off the coast of Suffolk. She was on a voyage from Hartlepool, County Durham to Havre de Grâce, Seine-Inférieure, France. She was refloated and taken in to Great Yarmouth, Norfolk. |
| Chili | United States | The barque was driven ashore and wrecked at Bolonia, Spain. |
| Danube | United States | The ship collided with Jean Bart (France), Lady Thackwell (United Kingdom) and Tarolints (United States) and then ran aground on the Sumatra Shoal. |
| Fénix | France | The brig was driven ashore and wrecked at Cádiz, Spain with the loss of two of her ten crew. She was on a voyage from Marseille, Bouches-du-Rhône to a Dutch port. |
| Flor | Spain | The brig was wrecked on the "Costello Coast". Her crew were rescued. She was on a voyage from Montevideo, Uruguay to the Rio Grande. |
| France et Angleterre | France | The full-rigged ship was wrecked at Cabo de Plata, Spain with the loss of thirteen of her fifteen crew. She was on a voyage from Coromandel, Mauritius to Marseille, Bouches-du-Rhône. |
| Index | United Kingdom | The brig was abandoned in the Atlantic Ocean. Her crew were rescued by Prompt (United Kingdom). Index was on a voyage from Berbice, British Guiana to London. |
| Isabella Heyne | United States | The barque was wrecked at Half Moon Bay, California with the loss of two of her crew. She was on a voyage from Hong Kong to San Francisco, California. |
| Jeune Susanne | France | The full-rigged ship was wrecked near "Kotu", Spain. Her crew were rescned. |
| L'Ami | United Kingdom | The brig was wrecked at the mouth of the Guadalquivir. Her crew were rescued. |
| Libra | United Kingdom | The ship was driven ashore on Naxos, Greece and sank. She was on a voyage from Newcastle upon Tyne, Northumberland to the Bosphorus. |
| Margaret | United Kingdom | The brig was driven ashore at Gibraltar. She was later refloated. |
| Meteor | United States | The full-rigged ship was wrecked near "Chicorra", Spain. Her crew were rescued. She was on a voyage from New York to Marseille, Bouches-du-Rhône, France. |
| Palmyra | United Kingdom | The ship was abandoned in the Atlantic Ocean. Her crew were rescued by Alma (United Kingdom). Palmyra was on a voyage from Demerara, British Guiana to London. |
| Palpite | Brazil | The brig was driven ashore and wrecked at Santa Cruz, Madeira. Her crew were ashore at the time. |
| Pauline | Venezuela | The ship departed from New York for Puerto Cabello. No further trace, presumed foundered with the loss of all hands. |
| Progress | United Kingdom | The ship departed from Liverpool for the Rio Nuñez and Île de Gorée, French Senegal. No further trace, presumed foundered with the loss of all hands. |
| Sebago | United States | The full-rigged ship was abandoned in the Atlantic Ocean with the loss of three of her crew. Survivors were rescued by Cybele and Spray (both United Kingdom). Sebago was on a voyage from New York to Falmouth, Cornwall, United Kingdom. |

== 9 January ==
List of shipwrecks: 9 January 1856
| Ship | State | Description |
|---|---|---|
| Alma | (United Kingdom of Great Britain and Ireland) New Zealand | The steamer struck the Sumner sandbar and sank. |
| Elizabeth | United Kingdom | The ship ran aground on McKenney's Bank, in Lough Foyle. She was on a voyage from Whitehaven, Cumberland to Londonderry. |
| Francis Ridley | United Kingdom | The ship was driven ashore in the Tagus downstream of Belém, Portugal. She was on a voyage from Callao, Peru to Queenstown, County Cork. She was refloated and taken in to Belém. |
| Hermelin | Sweden | The brig was driven ashore 3 nautical miles (5.6 km) east of Conil de la Frontera, Spain. Her twelve crew were rescued. She was on a voyage from Marseille, Bouches-du-Rhône to Akyab, Burma. |
| Invincible | United Kingdom | The barque was wrecked on a reef off Guam. Her crew were rescued. She was on a voyage from New Zealand to Manila, Spanish East Indies. |
| John | United Kingdom | The barque was driven ashore and wrecked 3 nautical miles (5.6 km) from Conil de la Frontera with the loss of three of her ten crew. She was on a voyage from Liverpool, Lancashire to Gibraltar. |
| Olivia | United States | The barque was abandoned and set afire in the Atlantic Ocean. Her crew were rescued by Emperor (United Kingdom). She was on a voyage from Cardiff, Glamorgan, United Kingdom to Savannah, Georgia. |
| Phoenix | United Kingdom | The full-rigged ship was wrecked on the Conchin Rocks, Spain. Her twelve crew were rescued. She was on a voyage from Alexandria, Egypt to Falmouth, Cornwall to Queenstown, County Cork. |
| Sting Ray | United States | The medium clipper was driven ashore on Fire Island, New York. She was on a voyage from Kong Kong to New York City. She broke up on 13 January. |
| Thor | Sweden | The barque was in collision with the schooner Helen (United Kingdom) and was abandoned 4 nautical miles (7.4 km) off the Smalls Lighthouse. Her crew were rescued. She was on a voyage from Alexandria to Liverpool. |

== 10 January ==
List of shipwrecks: 10 January 1856
| Ship | State | Description |
|---|---|---|
| Alexander | United Kingdom | The ship ran aground on the Arklow Banks, in the Irish Sea off the coast of County Wicklow. She was refloated and towed in to Dunmore East, County Waterford in a sinking condition. |
| Ardent | United Kingdom | The schooner ran aground on the Leman Sand, in the North Sea. She was on a voyage from Newcastle upon Tyne, Northumberland to Rouen, Seine-Inférieure, France. She floated off but consequently sank. Her crew were rescued by Betsey (United Kingdom). |
| E. K. Collins | United States | The pilot boat was wrecked off the Fire Island Inlet with the loss of four of the seven people on board. |
| Francisca Catalina | Kingdom of Sardinia | The brig was driven ashore and wrecked 9 nautical miles (17 km) from Conil de la Frontera, Spain. There was at least one survivor of her twelve crew. She was on a voyage from Brazil to Gibraltar. |
| Louis Napoleon | France | The ship was abandoned in the Atlantic Ocean. Her crew were rescued by John J. Boyd (United States. Louis Napoleon was on a voyage from Baltimore, Maryland, United States to Liverpool, Lancashire, United Kingdom. |
| Pristis | Argentina | The ship was abandoned in the Gulf Stream. She was on a voyage from Buenos Aires to New York, United States. |
| Silura | United Kingdom | The brigantine was abandoned west of Cádiz. She was on a voyage from Palermo, Sicily to Bristol, Gloucestershire. Her crew were rescued by the barque Anne Marie (France). Silura was taken in to Gibraltar on 22 January by Caroline (United Kingdom). |
| Squirrel | United Kingdom | The brig was in collision with Wyke Regis (United Kingdom) and was abandoned off the coast of Yorkshire. Her crew were rescued by Dash (United Kingdom). Squirrel was on a voyage from West Hartlepool, County Durham to Chatham, Kent. She was towed in to Scarborough, Yorkshire the next day. |

== 11 January ==
List of shipwrecks: 11 January 1856
| Ship | State | Description |
|---|---|---|
| Jagra | Sweden | The barque was run into by a schooner) and was consequently abandoned by her fourteen crew. They took to the longboat were later rescued by the smack Ellen (United Kingdom). Jagra was on a voyage from Alexandria, Egypt to Falmouth, Cornwall and Liverpool, Lancashire, United Kingdom. |
| Malabar | United Kingdom | The ship was driven ashore and wrecked in the Monach Islands, Outer Hebrides. She was on a voyage from the Clyde to Quebec City, Province of Canada, British North America or vice versa. fpho |
| Maria Meek | Netherlands | The brig was driven ashore and wrecked at Gibraltar. She was on a voyage from Galaţi, Ottoman Empire to Vlissingen, Zeeland. |
| Martha | United Kingdom | The ship caught fire, exploded and sank in the Bonny River. Her crew were rescued. |
| Mary | United Kingdom | The ship was abandoned in the North Sea off Whitby, Yorkshire. Her crew were rescued by the brig Apame (United Kingdom). Mary was on a voyage from South Shields, County Durham to Grimsby, Lincolnshire. |
| Mary Dunham | United Kingdom | The ship was abandoned in the Atlantic Ocean. Her crew were rescued by Talisman (United Kingdom). Mary Dunham was on a voyage from New York to Glasgow, Renfrewshire. |
| Prudence | United Kingdom | The barque was abandoned in the Atlantic Ocean (37°50′N 55°20′W). Her eleven crew were rescued by the full-rigged ship Julia Howard (United States). Prudence was on a voyage from Liverpool to New York, United States. |
| Saracen | United Kingdom | The ship caught fire, exploded and sank in the Bonny River. Her crew were rescued. |
| Vulcan | United Kingdom | The ship ran aground and sank off Ballycastle, County Antrim. Her crew were rescued. |
| Woodlands | United Kingdom | The ship ran aground off Redcastle. |
| Yarmouth | United States | The barque was driven ashore and wrecked at Gibraltar. She was on a voyage from Venice, Kingdom of Lombardy–Venetia to New York. |

== 12 January ==
List of shipwrecks: 12 January 1856
| Ship | State | Description |
|---|---|---|
| Buena Vesta | United States | The ship ran aground in Catherine Sound. She was on a voyage from Trapani, Sicily to Savannah, Georgia. |
| Creamore | United Kingdom | The ship departed from Alexandria, Egypt for Falmouth, Cornwall. No further trace, presumed foundered with the loss of all hands. |
| Edward | United Kingdom | The brig was driven ashore 12 nautical miles (22 km) east of Christiansand, Norway. She was on a voyage from London to "Hohnestrand". |
| Endivilla | United Kingdom | The brigantine was driven ashore and wrecked between Gijón and Cape Lostres, Spain with the loss of all on board. |
| Intrepid | United Kingdom | The ship was driven ashore at Wicklow. She was on a voyage from Liverpool, Lancashire to Enniscorthy, County Wexford. |
| Liverpool | United Kingdom | The ship was driven ashore and damaged at Pennant Point, Nova Scotia, British North America. She was on a voyage from Halifax, Nova Scotia to Liverpool. |
| Phoenix | United Kingdom | The full-rigged ship was driven onto the Cochino Rocks, off Cádiz, Spain and sank. Her twelve crew were rescued. |
| Rapid | United Kingdom | The ship was abandoned in the Atlantic Ocean. Her crew were rescued by Truro (United Kingdom). Rapid was on a voyage from Rio de Janeiro, Brazil to the English Channel. |
| Rookery | United Kingdom | The barque was lost off Rogliano, Kingdom of the Two Sicilies with the loss of all but two of her crew. She was on a voyage from Genoa, Kingdom of Sardinia to Constantinople, Ottoman Empire. |

== 13 January ==
List of shipwrecks: 13 January 1856
| Ship | State | Description |
|---|---|---|
| Irene | United Kingdom | The ship was driven ashore at Fawn, United States. She was on a voyage from Liverpool, Lancashire to Boston, Massachusetts, United States. |
| Pandora | United Kingdom | The ship ran aground at Margate, Kent. She was on a voyage from Hartlepool, County Durham to Margate. She was refloated. |
| Potomac | United States | The ship sprang a leak in the South Atlantic and was abandoned. Her eighteen crew took to two boats. Twelve in one boat reached the coast of Brazil, the other six were reported missing. |
| Thomas Forrest | United Kingdom | The barque ran aground on the Kentish Knock. She floated off and sank on the Brake Sand She was on a voyage from South Shields, County Durham to Constantinople, Ottoman Empire. Thomas Forrest was refloated and taken in to Ramsgate, Kent in a waterlogged condition. |

== 14 January ==
List of shipwrecks: 14 January 1856
| Ship | State | Description |
|---|---|---|
| Attruck | United Kingdom | The ship foundered off Alexandria, Egypt Eyalet. Her crew were rescued. |
| Ben-Muick-Dhui | United Kingdom | The ship was driven ashore at Lisbon, Portugal. She was on a voyage from London to Bahia, Brazil. She was refloated on 16 January. |
| Blanch | United Kingdom | The ship ran aground on the Nash Sands, in the Bristol Channel off the coast of Glamorgan and sank with the loss of two of her crew. |
| Cyprus | United Kingdom | The ship was wrecked at "Mokota", on the Black Sea coast with the loss of a crew member. |
| Newa | Spain | The steamship was driven ashore at Saint-Cyprien, Pyrénées-Orientales, France. All 33 people on board were rescued. She was on a voyage from Barcelona to Cette, Hérault. |
| Norfolk | United Kingdom | The ship caught fire and sank at Belfast, County Antrim. She was on a voyage from Sligo to Liverpool, Lancashire. |
| Perseverance | United Kingdom | The brig was wrecked on the Boulder Bank, in the Solent. Her crew were rescued. She was on a voyage from Sunderland, County Durham to Southampton, Hampshire. |
| Richard | United Kingdom | The ship sprang a leak and was beached at Pill, Somerset. She was on a voyage from Bristol, Gloucestershire to Droitwich, Worcestershire. |

== 15 January ==
List of shipwrecks: 15 January 1856
| Ship | State | Description |
|---|---|---|
| George Hurlbutt | United States | The ship departed from New York for Antwerp, Belgium. No further trace, presumed foundered with the loss of all hands. |
| Honne | Denmark | The schooner was driven ashore near Altskagen. She was on a voyage from Hartlepool, County Durham, United Kingdom to Aarhus. She was refloated. |
| James Taylor | United Kingdom | The ship was wrecked on the north point of Cyprus. She was on a voyage from Mersin, Ottoman Empire to the Crimea. |
| John Knox | United States | The ship ran aground on the Chandeliers, off the coast of Alabama. |
| Nais | United Kingdom | The schooner was driven ashore and wrecked between Penzance and St. Michael's Mount, Cornwall. Her crew were rescued. |
| Orion | United Kingdom | The brig was wrecked on Formentera, Balearic Islands, Spain. Her crew were rescued. She was on a voyage from Palma de Mallorca to Cádiz, Spain. |

== 16 January ==
List of shipwrecks: 16 January 1856
| Ship | State | Description |
|---|---|---|
| Active | United Kingdom | The ship was wrecked north of Viana do Castelo, Portugal with the loss of all but three of her crew. She was on a voyage from the Clyde to Porto, Portugal. |
| Artagne | Denmark | The schooner was in collision with a steamship and ran aground on the North Bank, in Liverpool Bay. She was on a voyage from Alexandria, Egypt to Liverpool, Lancashire, United Kingdom. She was refloated the next day and taken in to Liverpool. |
| Barbara | United Kingdom | The schooner was driven ashore and wrecked at Port St. Mary, Isle of Man. Her crew were rescued. She was on a voyage from Douglas, Isle of Man to Whitehaven, Cumberland. |
| Bianca | United Kingdom | The ship was abandoned in the Atlantic Ocean. Her crew were rescued by the steamship Albis (Hamburg). Bianca was on a voyage from Valparaíso, Chile to Cork and/or Queenstown, County Cork. |
| Delicia | (United Kingdom of Great Britain and Ireland) Jersey | The schooner was driven ashore and wrecked on São Miguel Island, Azores. |
| Mars | United Kingdom | The ship was wrecked between Penzance and St. Michael's Mount, Cornwall. Her crew were rescued. She was on a voyage from Casablanca, Morocco to Havre de Grâce, Seine-Inférieure, France. |
| Meta | United Kingdom | The brig was driven ashore and wrecked near Beyrout, Ottoman Syria. |
| San Domingo | United Kingdom | The ship was beached at Queenstown, County Cork and sank. She was on a voyage from Trieste to Queenstown. |

== 17 January ==
List of shipwrecks: 17 January 1856
| Ship | State | Description |
|---|---|---|
| Albyn | United Kingdom | The barque was driven ashore at Alexandria, Egypt. She was refloated. |
| Content | United Kingdom | The brig was wrecked on the Holm Sand, in the North Sea off the coast of Suffolk. Her nine crew were rescued by a yawl. She was on a voyage from Newcastle upon Tyne, Northumberland to London. |
| Cumberland Lass | United Kingdom | The ship ran aground and was severely damaged at Alexandria. |
| Highland Mary | United Kingdom | The barque was driven ashore and damaged at Alexandria. She was refloated. |
| Jessie Greig | United Kingdom | The ship was driven ashore and wrecked on Terceira Island, Azores. Her crew were rescued. She was on a voyage from Callao, Peru to Queenstown, County Cork. |
| Liberty | United Kingdom | The ship ran aground on the Shipwash Sand, in the North Sea off the coast of Suffolk and sank. Her crew were reached the Shipwash Lightship ( Trinity House) in their boat. They were taken off on 26 January. |
| Tyne | United Kingdom | The ship was driven ashore and wrecked 2 nautical miles (3.7 km) south of Scarborough, Yorkshire. Her crew were rescued. |

== 18 January ==
List of shipwrecks: 18 January 1856
| Ship | State | Description |
|---|---|---|
| Atlas | United Kingdom | The ship ran aground on the Newcombe Sand, in the North Sea off the coast of Suffolk. She was on a voyage from London to Sunderland, County Durham. She was refloated and taken in to Lowestoft, Suffolk in a leaky condition. |
| George Lord | United Kingdom | The brig was wrecked between Brook and Compton, Isle of Wight. All on board were rescued by the Brook Lifeboat. She was on a voyage from Patras, Greece to London. |
| Horizon | United Kingdom | The ship was wrecked on the Arklow Bank, in the Irish Sea off the coast of County Wicklow. Her crew were rescued. She was on a voyage from Liverpool, Lancashire to New Orleans, Louisiana, United States. |
| Jane Petrie | United Kingdom | The ship ran aground on the Great Burbo Bank, in Liverpool Bay. She was on a voyage from Bolivia to Liverpool. She was refloated the next day and put back to Liverpool. |
| John Howell | United Kingdom | The ship was damaged by fire at Savannah, Georgia, United States. |
| Lady Franklin | United Kingdom | The barque was driven ashore near Southport, Lancashire. |
| Luggie | United Kingdom | The schooner was wrecked at Hasle, Bornholm, Denmark. Her crew were rescued. |
| Ruby | United Kingdom | The schooner was wrecked on the Newcombe Sand. Her crew were rescued by a yawl. She was on a voyage from Liverpool to Great Yarmouth, Norfolk. |
| St. George | United Kingdom | The brig struck the White Rock, off Guernsey, Channel Islands and capsized. She was on a voyage from Sunderland to Morlaix, Finistère, France. She was refloated on 23 February and taken in to Guernsey. |

== 19 January ==
List of shipwrecks: 19 January 1856
| Ship | State | Description |
|---|---|---|
| Empress | United Kingdom | The ship struck the Alderman Rocks, off the coast of County Cork. She was on a voyage from Paraíba, Brazil to Crookhaven, County Cork. She was refloated and completed her voyage. |
| Moro Castle | United Kingdom | The ship was abandoned in the Atlantic Ocean. All on board were rescued by Alfred Storer and Neptune's Favourite (both United Kingdom). Moro Castle was on a voyage from Saint John, New Brunswick, British North America to the Clyde. |
| Trinity Yacht | United Kingdom | The schooner was driven out to sea from Faial Island, Azores. No further trace, presumed foundered. |

== 20 January ==
List of shipwrecks: 20 January 1856
| Ship | State | Description |
|---|---|---|
| Blanche | United Kingdom | The ship was wrecked on Kidney Island, Falkland Islands. She was on a voyage from Newcastle upon Tyne, Northumberland to Stanley, Falkland Islands and Caldera, Chile. |
| Cornelia | United Kingdom | The ship was wrecked at Noordwijk, South Holland, Netherlands. Her crew were rescued. She was on a voyage from Moulmein, Burma to Amsterdam, North Holland, Netherlands. |
| Henriette | France | The brig was driven ashore and wrecked at Port-Vendres, Pyrénées-Orientales with the loss of a crew member. She was on a voyage from "Gigelly", Africa to Marseille, Bouches-du-Rhône. |
| Valparaiso | United Kingdom | The ship was wrecked on the Riding Rocks, in the Bahamas. She was on a voyage from New Orleans, Louisiana, United States to Liverpool, Lancashire. |
| Wilhelm Martin | Flag unknown | The ship was driven ashore in the Orinoco River. She was on a voyage from Liverpool, Lancashire, United Kingdom to Ciudad Bolívar, Venezuelad. |

== 21 January ==
List of shipwrecks: 21 January 1856
| Ship | State | Description |
|---|---|---|
| Airdrie | United Kingdom | The schooner sprang a leak and sank in the Belfast Lough. She was on a voyage from Glasgow, Renfrewshire to Porto, Portugal. She was later refloated and returned to service. |
| Bee | United Kingdom | The ship was abandoned in the Atlantic Ocean. Her crew were rescued by the barque Hannibal (United States). Bee was on a voyage from Callao, Peru to Liverpool, Lancashire. |
| Duke of Richmond | United Kingdom | The smack ran onto rocks near the Haulbowline Lighthouse, County Louth. She was on a voyage form Portaferry, County Down to Liverpool. She was refloated and taken in to Warrenpoint, County Antrim. |
| Orient | Portugal | The brig was wrecked on the Guince Rock, off Lisbon with the loss of at least ten lives. There were six survivors. She was on a voyage from Loanda, Portuguese West Africa to Lisbon. |
| Sea Bird | United Kingdom | The ship ran aground on the Haisborough Sands, in the North Sea off the coast of Norfolk and was beached at Mundesley. She was refloated on 29 January and taken in to Great Yarmouth, Norfolk in a severely leaky condition. |

== 22 January ==
List of shipwrecks: 22 January 1856
| Ship | State | Description |
|---|---|---|
| Dahlia | United Kingdom | The ship was driven ashore at Pakefield, Suffolk. She was on a voyage from Woolwich, Kent to Sunderland, County Durham. She was refloated on 25 January and taken in to Lowestoft, Suffolk. |
| Egyptian Witch | United Kingdom | The ship was driven ashore at Alexandria, Egypt. |
| General Murray | United Kingdom | The brig sprang a leak in the North Sea and was abandoned by all but her captain. Her crew were rescued by Mary Ann (United Kingdom). General Murray was on a voyage from South Shields, County Durham to London. |
| Good Intent | United Kingdom | The barque was taken in to Saint-Pierre in a derelict condition. |
| Independence | United States | The barque was wrecked at Battystown, County Louth, United Kingdom. Her 30 crew were rescued by the steamship Folg-a-Ballagh (United Kingdom). Independence was on a voyage from Liverpool, Lancashire, United Kingdom to New Orleans, Louisiana. She floated off on 8 February and was taken in tow, but ran aground off "Billystown". |
| Neptunus | Sweden | The ship ran aground on the Shipwash Sand, in the North Sea off the coast of Suffolk, United Kingdom, She floated off but consequently sank off the Cork Sand. Her crew were reached the Cork Lightship ( Trinity House), from where they were rescued by the smack Cyrene (United Kingdom). Neptunus was on a voyage from Newcastle upon Tyne, Northumberland, United Kingdom to Constantinople, Ottoman Empire. |
| Vulcan | United Kingdom | The barque was driven ashore at Barber's Point, in the Dardanelles. She was on a voyage from London to Constantinople, Ottoman Empire. |

== 23 January ==
List of shipwrecks: 23 January 1856
| Ship | State | Description |
|---|---|---|
| Alciope | United Kingdom | The brig was driven ashore at Ballagan Point, County Louth. She was on a voyage form Liverpool, Lancashire to Africa. She was refloated and taken in to Carlingford. |
| Catherine | United Kingdom | The ship ran aground at South Shields, County Durham. She was on a voyage from South Shields to Dundee, Forfarshire. She was refloated with assistance from the steamship Royal Albert (United Kingdom and resumed her voyage. |
| Laure | France | The schooner was in collision with a full-rigged ship in the English Channel and was abandoned. She was on a voyage from Newcastle upon Tyne, Northumberland, United Kingdom to Cette, Hérault. She was subsequently towed in to Shoreham-by-Sea, Sussex, United Kingdom by the tug Adur (United Kingdom). |
| Mary Wylie | United Kingdom | The brig was driven ashore between Castrup and Dragoe, Denmark. She was on a voyage from Pillau, Prussia to Hull, Yorkshire. She was refloated on 29 January and taken in to Helsingør, Denmark. |
| Pacific | United States | The passenger ship departed from Liverpool, Lancashire, United Kingdom for New York City. No further trace, presumed to have struck an iceberg and foundered in the North Atlantic Ocean near Newfoundland with the loss of all 186 people on board. |

== 24 January ==
List of shipwrecks: 24 January 1856
| Ship | State | Description |
|---|---|---|
| Amelia | United Kingdom | The brig was wrecked in the Gwendraeth Fawr with the loss of all but one of her sixteen crew. She was on a voyage from Milford Haven, Pembrokeshire to Antwerp, Belgium. |
| Amulet | United Kingdom | The ship was driven ashore at South Shields, County Durham. She was refloated and towed in to the River Tyne, where she capsized and sank at Pelaw, Northumberland. |
| Elvira | United States | The ship was driven ashore at Saint Mawes, Cornwall, United Kingdom. |
| Enrica | United Kingdom | The ship was driven ashore at Saint Mawes. She was on a voyage from London to New York, United States. |
| Gertrude | United Kingdom | The ship was driven ashore at Saint Mawes. |
| Kathleen | United Kingdom | The ship was driven ashore and wrecked in Lough Foyle. She was on a voyage from Alexandria, Egypt Eyalet to Londonderry. She was refloated on 7 February. |
| Mail | United Kingdom | The steamship was driven against the quayside at Dublin and was holed. |
| Merrington | United Kingdom | The brig was wrecked on the Scroby Sands, Norfolk. Her crew were rescued. She was on a voyage from Sunderland, County Durham to London. |
| Orient | United States | The ship was driven ashore at Saint Mawes. |
| Pursuit | United Kingdom | The brig was abandoned in the Atlantic Ocean off the Azores and foundered. Her crew survived. She was on a voyage from Matanzas, Cuba to the Clyde. |

== 25 January ==
List of shipwrecks: 25 January 1856
| Ship | State | Description |
|---|---|---|
| Annabella | United Kingdom | The ship ran aground on the Craigmon Rocks. She was on a voyage from Hartlepool, County Durham to Grangemouth, Stirlingshire. She was refloated on 28 January and taken in to Limekilns, Fife in a severely damaged condition. |
| Gipsy | United Kingdom | The barque was damaged by fire at Demerara, British Guiana. |
| Mary Mitchenson | United Kingdom | The ship was driven ashore at the Heugh Battery, Hartlepool, County Durham. She was refloated the next day with assistance from the tug Ranger (United Kingdom). |
| Shooting Star | United States | The full-rigged ship ran aground on a reef off Pernambuco, Brazil. She was refloated and taken in to Pernambuco. |
| Victoria | United Kingdom | The ship was wrecked at Shadla Point, Ottoman Empire. Her crew were rescued. |

== 26 January ==
List of shipwrecks: 26 January 1856
| Ship | State | Description |
|---|---|---|
| Annabella | United Kingdom | The barque was driven ashore and wrecked at D'Urban, Cape Colony. She was on a voyage from London to Natal. |
| Mary Marsden | United Kingdom | The ship ran aground at Waterford. She was on a voyage from Waterford to Liverpool, Lancashire. She was refloated and resumed her voyage. |
| Standard | United Kingdom | The ship was wrecked at Lisbon, Portugal. |
| Vest | United Kingdom | The ship ran aground at Sand Point, Northumberland. She was on a voyage from Blyth, Northumberland to Boulogne, Pas-de-Calais, France. She was refloated and taken in to Blyth. |

== 27 January ==
List of shipwrecks: 27 January 1856
| Ship | State | Description |
|---|---|---|
| Josephine | France | The schooner ran aground on the Whitby Rock. She was on a voyage from Hartlepool, County Durham, United Kingdom to Cherbourg, Seine-Inférieure. She was refloated and taken in to Whitby, Yorkshire, United Kingdom in a waterlogged condition. |
| Martha | United States | The ship was driven ashore 3 nautical miles (5.6 km) east of Dunkirk, Nord, France. Her crew were rescued. |
| Webster | United States | The brig foundered off Cape Spartel, Morocco. Her nine crew survived. She was on a voyage from Cádiz, Spain to the Rio Grande. |

== 28 January ==
List of shipwrecks: 28 January 1856
| Ship | State | Description |
|---|---|---|
| Driver | United Kingdom | The schooner was driven ashore at Newburgh, Fife. She was on a voyage from Sunderland, County Durham to Newburgh. |
| François I | France | The ship was wrecked at the mouth of the River Plate. All on board were rescued. She was on a voyage from Bayonne, Basses-Pyrénées to Buenos Aires, Argentina and Montevideo, Uruguay. |
| Kertch | United Kingdom | The ship was damaged by fire at Venus Point, Georgia. |
| Mary Ann | United Kingdom | The ship collided with Admiral Collingwood and was abandoned in the North Sea off Huntcliffe, Yorkshire. Three crew were rescued by Admiral Collingwood; the other two took to a boat and were rescued the next day by William and Jane (United Kingdom). Mary Ann was on a voyage from London to Hartlepool, County Durham. She was driven ashore at Raven Hill the next day and was wrecked. |

== 29 January ==
List of shipwrecks: 29 January 1856
| Ship | State | Description |
|---|---|---|
| Frau Anna | Hamburg | The ship foundered in the North Sea off Spurn Point, Yorkshire, United Kingdom. Her crew survived. She was on a voyage from Lerwick, Shetland Islands, United Kingdom to Harburg via Grimsby, Lincolnshire, United Kingdom. |
| Joyeuse | France | The schooner capsized off Newhaven, Sussex, United Kingdom with the loss of all five crew. She was on a voyage from a Spanish port to Dunkirk, Nord. She was towed in to Shoreham-by-Sea, Sussex in a capsized condition on 30 January by two tugs. |
| La Blanche | France | The fishing boat was in collision with the full-rigged ship Recruit (United Kingdom) and sank in the English Channel with the loss of one of her seven crew. |
| Mary | United Kingdom | The schooner ran aground at Holyhead, Anglesey and was wrecked. She was on a voyage from Southampton, Hampshire to Liverpool, Lancashire. |
| Minna | Kingdom of Hanover | The galiot was wrecked 8 nautical miles (15 km) south west of Cape Bon, Beylik of Tunis. She was on a voyage from Newcastle upon Tyne, Northumberland, United Kingdom to Constantinople, Ottoman Empire. |
| HMS Polyphemus | Royal Navy | The Alecto-class sloop was wrecked on Wangerooge, Kingdom of Hanover with the loss of nine of her 40 crew. |

== 30 January ==
List of shipwrecks: 30 January 1856
| Ship | State | Description |
|---|---|---|
| Atalanta | United Kingdom | The fishing boat was run down and sunk in the River Thames at Shellhaven, Essex by the paddle steamer Giraffe (United Kingdom) with the loss of a crew member. |
| Cazador | Chilean Navy | Cazador The steamship was wrecked at Point Carranza with the loss of at least 307 lives. There were 23 survivors. She was on a voyage from Talcahuano to Valparaíso. |
| Joyeuse | France | The ship capsized in a squall and was subsequently beached at Shoreham-by-Sea, Sussex, United Kingdom. |

== 31 January ==
List of shipwrecks: 31 January 1856
| Ship | State | Description |
|---|---|---|
| Dolphin | United Kingdom | The paddle steamer collided with the paddle steamer Baron Osy (Belgium) in the River Thames and was beached at Northfleet, Kent with the loss of two lives. Most of her passengers were rescued by Baron Osy. Dolphin was on a voyage from London to Newcastle upon Tyne, Northumberland. Following temporary repairs, she was refloated and taken in to Deptford, Kent. The accident was caused by Baron Osy displaying her navigation lights the wrong way round. |
| Europa | United Kingdom | The ship was abandoned in the Atlantic Ocean. She was on a voyage from Callao, Peru to an English port. She was towed in to Faial Island, Azores on 5 February. It was discovered that a number of holes had been bored in her bottom. Subsequently repaired, but lost on 1 March 1856. |
| Matilda | United Kingdom | The brigantine ran aground on the Dutchman's Bank, in Liverpool Bay. She was on a voyage from Liverpool, Lancashire to Waterford. She was refloated with assistance from a tug. |
| Pallada | Imperial Russian Navy | Crimean War: The Pallada-class frigate was scuttled at Sevastopol because her hull had been severely damaged by ice that winter. |

== Unknown date ==
List of shipwrecks: Unknown date in January 1856
| Ship | State | Description |
|---|---|---|
| Alma | United Kingdom | The ship foundered in the Atlantic Ocean west of the Azores. Her crew were rescued by Fortune (France). Alma was on a voyage from New York, United States to Cádiz, Spain. |
| Alpen | Norway | The ship was driven ashore near Gallipoli, Ottoman Empire before 14 January. She was refloated with assistance from the steamship Empress Eugenie (France). |
| Apollo | United Kingdom | The transport ship was wrecked in the Dardanelles before 17 January. Her captain committed suicide. |
| Auguste | France | The brig was driven ashore and wrecked at Mogador, Morocco between 1 and 7 January. Her crew were rescued. |
| Chebucto | (United Kingdom of Great Britain and Ireland) British North America | The ship was abandoned in the Atlantic Ocean. Her crew were rescued by John Cottle (United Kingdom). Chebucto was on a voyage from Halifax, Nova Scotia to Liverpool, Lancashire. |
| Crescent | United Kingdom | The brig was driven ashore and wrecked at Mogador with the loss of all but one of her crew between 1 and 7 January. |
| Cygnet | United Kingdom | The paddle steamer was driven ashore in Blackmill Bay. She was refloated on 22 January and taken in to Glasgow, Renfrewshire. |
| Doris | United Kingdom | The barque foundered off Tongoy, Chile before 30 January. Her crew were rescued. |
| Duc de Braganza | Portugal | The barque was wrecked on the American coast with the loss of all hands. |
| Eliza | United Kingdom | The ship was wrecked in the River Plate with the loss of a crew member. She was on a voyage from Montevideo, Uruguay to a British port. |
| Elizabeth | United Kingdom | The brig was driven ashore and wrecked at Mogador between 1 and 7 January. Her crew were rescued. |
| Enrichetta | Grand Duchy of Tuscany | The barque was abandoned at Syra, Greece between 14 and 16 January. |
| Falcon | United Kingdom | The steamship ran aground on the North Bank, in the Irish Sea off the coast of County Cork. |
| Fernando el Católico | Spain | The steamship was wrecked near Nuevitas, Cuba. |
| Free Trader | United Kingdom | The brig was wrecked in Placentia Bay after 17 January with the loss of all hands. She was on a voyage from New York, United States to Saint John's, Newfoundland, British North America. |
| Fidget | United Kingdom | The schooner collided with Margaret (United Kingdom) and sank at Mazagan, Morocco between 8 and 10 July. Her seven crew were rescued by Margaret. |
| Fortuna | United Kingdom | The brigantine foundered off Casablanca, Morocco before 7 January. Her crew were rescued by the brig St. Nicholas ( (Ottoman Empire) Ottoman Syria). |
| Garrow | United Kingdom | The ship foundered in the Atlantic Ocean 150 nautical miles (280 km) west of Cape Clear Island, County Cork before 24 January. Her crew were rescued by Snowdon (United Kingdom). Garrow was on a voyage from Africa to Liverpool. |
| Gerda | United Kingdom | The ship was lost whilst on a voyage from Galaţi, Ottoman Empire to a British port. |
| Greyhound | United Kingdom | The brigantine was driven ashore and wrecked at Mogador between 1 and 7 January with the loss of two of her crew. |
| Heber Studley | United States | The ship was abandoned. Her crew were rescued by the barque Henry Sceltan (United States. Hebe Studley was on a voyage from New Orleans, Louisiana to Liverpool. |
| HMS Hecate | Royal Navy | The Hydra-class sloop ran aground at Lagos. |
| Helen | United Kingdom | The ship was abandoned in the Atlantic Ocean. After drifting for more than 2,000 nautical miles (3,700 km), she was taken in tow by a fishing smack on 17 August, and taken in to Stornoway, Isle of Lewis, Outer Hebrides on 21 August. |
| Herwynen | United Kingdom | The ship was lost whilst on a voyage from London to the Black Sea. |
| Innes | United Kingdom | The ship was driven ashore at Sunderland, County Durham before 11 January. She was refloated on 3 February and sailed for Arbroath, Forfarshire. |
| Maid of Auckland | United Kingdom | The barque was abandoned in the Atlantic Ocean. Her crew were rescued by Equity (United Kingdom). Maid of Auckland was on a voyage from Boston, Massachusetts, United States to London. |
| Margaret | United Kingdom | The ship was wrecked on "Azzaza Island". She was on a voyage from an English port to Calcutta, India. |
| Mary | United Kingdom | The barque was driven ashore near Gallipoli before 14 January. She was on a voyage from Portsmouth, Hampshire to Balaklava, Russia. She was refloated several days later with the assistance of the steamship Empress Eugenie (France). |
| Mermaid | United Kingdom | The brig was driven ashore and wrecked at Mogador between 1 and 7 January. Her crew were rescued. |
| Oscar and Tell | United Kingdom | The ship was wrecked near Cotrone, Kingdom of the Two Sicilies before 21 January. She was on a voyage from Gallipoli, Ottoman Empire to Falmouth, Cornwall. |
| Pacific | United States | The schooner was driven ashore and wrecked at Long Beach, New York with the loss of all but two of her crew. |
| Paz | Chile | The full-rigged ship foundered in the Pacific Ocean. There were some survivors. She was on a voyage from San Francisco, California to a port in Oregon, United States. |
| Pierre Josephine | United Kingdom | The brig was abandoned at Syra between 14 and 16 January. |
| Ravenswood | United Kingdom | The full-rigged ship was driven ashore on Pico Island, Azores before 21 January. She was on a voyage from Havre de Grâce, Seine-Inférieure, France to New York. |
| Rosario | Chile | The full-rigged ship was abandoned in the Pacific Ocean before 30 January with the loss of a passenger. She was on a voyage from Valparaíso to Cork. |
| Sejuca | Brazil | The ship was abandoned in the Atlantic Ocean. Her crew were rescued by Excelsior (United Kingdom). Sejuca was on a voyage from Bahia to Liverpool. |
| Telegraph | United Kingdom | The steamship ran aground in the Tagus before 12 January. |
| Tjaca | Brazil | The ship was abandoned in the Atlantic Ocean. Her crew were rescued by Exclesior (France). Tjaca was on a voyage from Bahia to New York and Liverpool. |
| Tuavia | Grand Duchy of Mecklenburg-Schwerin | The brig was driven ashore and wrecked at Gibraltar before 16 January. Her crew were rescued by Tagus (Portugal). |
| Unicorn | United Kingdom | The ship was destroyed by fire at "Yazor City", Nova Scotia, British North America on or before 3 January. All on board were rescued. |
| Ville d'Ajaccio | France | The brigantine was driven ashore and wrecked at Mogador between 1 and 7 January. Her crew were rescued. |
| Zarah | (United Kingdom of Great Britain and Ireland) Jersey | The barque was in collision with Labuan (United Kingdom) and sank in the Straits of Malacca before 23 January. |
