= Old Moybologue Cemetery =

Cemetery in County Cavan, Ireland

Coordinates: 53°52′19″N 6°57′02″W

Moybologue old graveyard is a circular enclosure in County Cavan, Ireland. The site dates from the Early Christian Period and features the ruins of a medieval church and a graveyard.

== Description ==
The graveyard is surrounded by a dry-stone wall and forms part of a much larger ecclesiastical enclosure, which includes the remains of a well-preserved twelfth century Norman motte in a field to the west. Not much is known of the church except that a hospital or hospice existed here during the medieval period. Medieval hospices provided food and rest to travellers as well as taking care of the sick or dying. By the time the Barony of Clankee map was drawn up in 1604, the church at Moybologue was already in ruin and was depicted without a roof and situated next to a tower, likely a belfry.

At present, only a part of the north wall of the nave survives of the church. This is joined to a roofless transept which served as a priest's residence. The transept consists of two stories and features hood-moulding on the window on the upper floor. There is also evidence of a fireplace in the structure.

There are over 350 headstones or grave markers in the graveyard; including cupmarked/bullaun stones, two grave slabs, two cross slabs, three termon or churchyard crosses, a font, a holed stone and an inscribed stone.

In 2020, Moybologue Historical Society secured funding from the Community Monuments Fund to carry out lime mortar restoration of the stonework in and around the graveyard. An interpretative panel was also added at this time. Thanks to subsequent funding under the Community Monuments Fund, a digital audio guide and ArcGIS StoryMap were created and published for the site.

Moybologue Old Graveyard is a part of Cavan Historic Graveyards Network.

== Location ==
Moybologue Old Graveyard is located in the townland of Relaghabeg, County Cavan, about 5 km from Bailieborough. Moybologue New Cemetery, which opened in 1952, can be found less than 1 km to the north east. The modern church is St. Patrick's Roman Catholic church in Tierworker, on the border with County Meath.
