= Bullaun =

Depression in a stone which fills with water

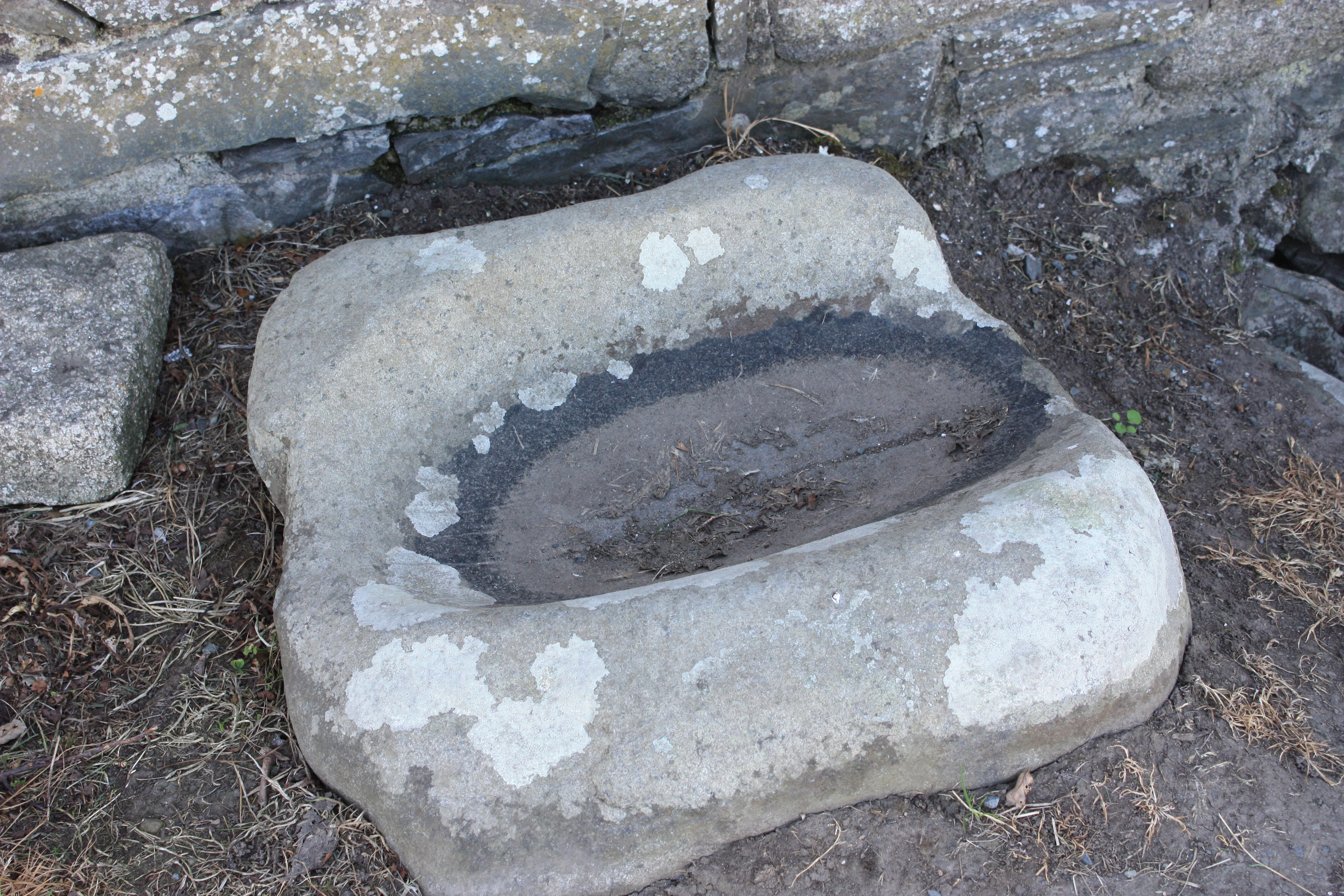
Bullaun at St John's Point Church, County Down, Ulster, Ireland, October 2009

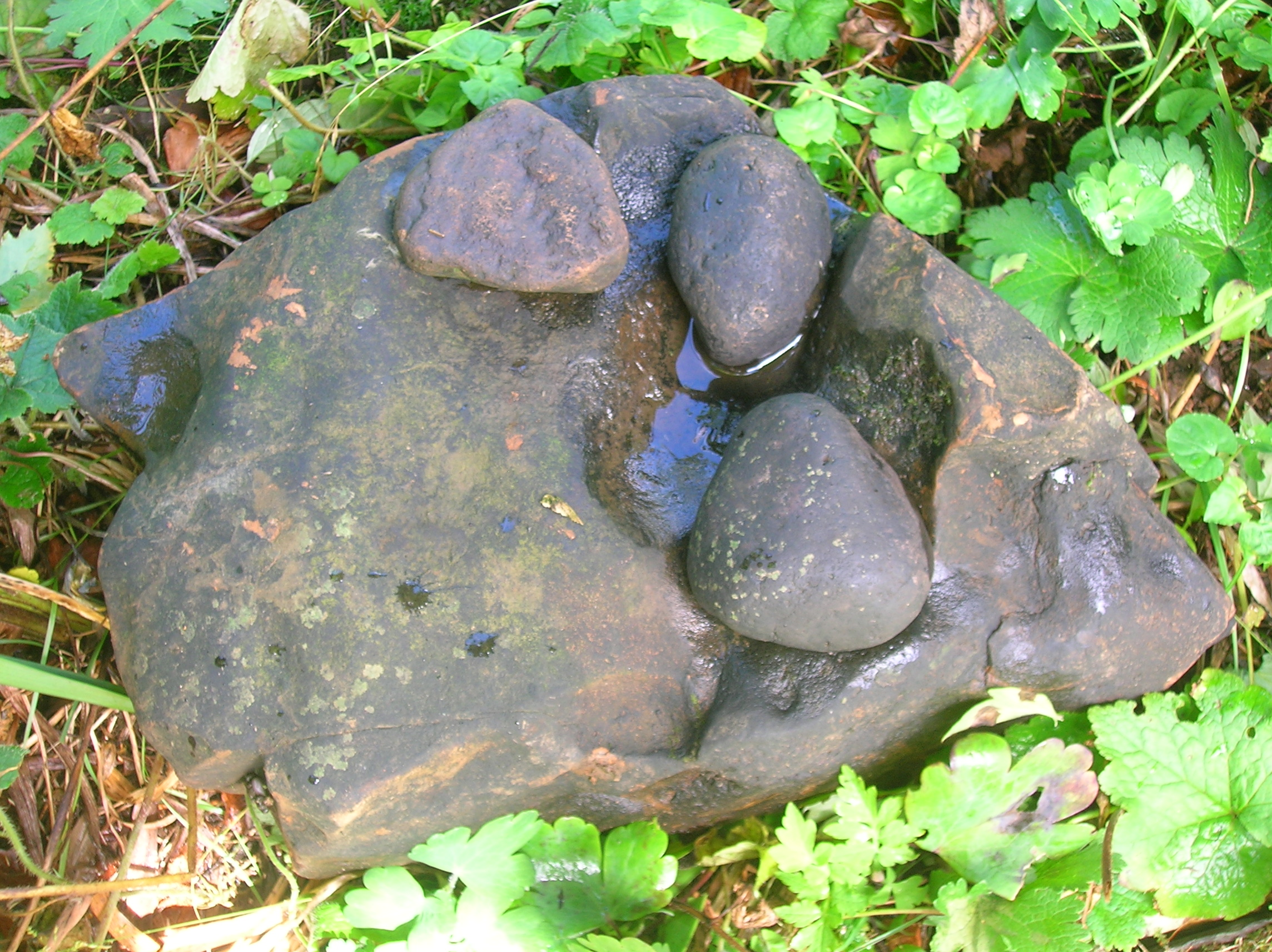
A bullaun in Chapeltoun, Ayrshire, Scotland

A bullaun (Irish: bullán; from a word cognate with "bowl" and French bol) is the term used for the depression in a stone which is often water filled. Natural rounded boulders or pebbles may sit in the bullaun. The size of the bullaun is highly variable and these hemispherical cups hollowed out of a rock may come as singles or multiples within the same rock.

Local folklore often attaches religious or magical significance to bullaun stones, such as the belief that the rainwater collecting in a stone's hollow has healing properties. Ritual use of some bullaun stones continued well into the Christian period and many are found in association with early churches, such as the 'Deer' Stone at Glendalough, County Wicklow. The example at St Brigit's Stone, County Cavan, still has its 'cure' or 'curse' stones. These would be used by turning them whilst praying for or cursing somebody. In May 2012 the second cursing stone to be found in Scotland was discovered on Canna and drawn soon after by archaeological illustrator Thomas Small. It has been dated to c. 800. The first was found on the Shiant Islands. It has been dated to c. 800. The stones were latterly known as 'Butterlumps'.

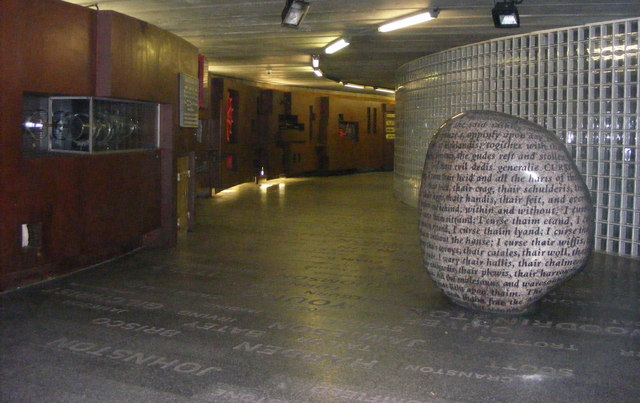
The Cursing Stone at Millennium Bridge Subway in Carlisle, England, February 2011

St. Aid or Áed mac Bricc was Bishop of Killare in 6th-century. At Saint Aid's birth his head had hit a stone, leaving a hole in which collected rainwater that cured all ailments, thus identifying it with the Irish tradition of Bullaun stones.

Bullauns are not unique to Ireland and Scotland, being also found on the Swedish island of Gotland, Lithuania and France. 'King Arthur's footprint' at Tintagel Castle, Cornwall, among other circular depressions at prehistoric ritual sites in Devon & Cornwall, was previously associated with kingship rituals. Possibly enlarged from already-existing solution-pits caused by rain, bullauns are reminiscent of the cup-marked stones which occur all over Atlantic Europe, and their significance (if not their precise use) must date from Neolithic times.

Rosewall Hill near St Ives in Cornwall UK has several bullaun which can be found on top, or near the tops of the granite outcrops or cairns on high points on the hill. It is open to question as to whether or not these are man-made or formed by the natural erosion of the granite. Many of the granite boulders on this hill have what appear to be erosion formed concavities, usually pear shaped, which indicate bullaun in formation. However, the location of the larger forms on the tops of the outcrops does suggest that these sites have been chosen. Trevalgan Hill, just to the north of Rosewall Hill, has a round bullaun some 50 cm across as can be seen in the photograph.

== Gallery ==
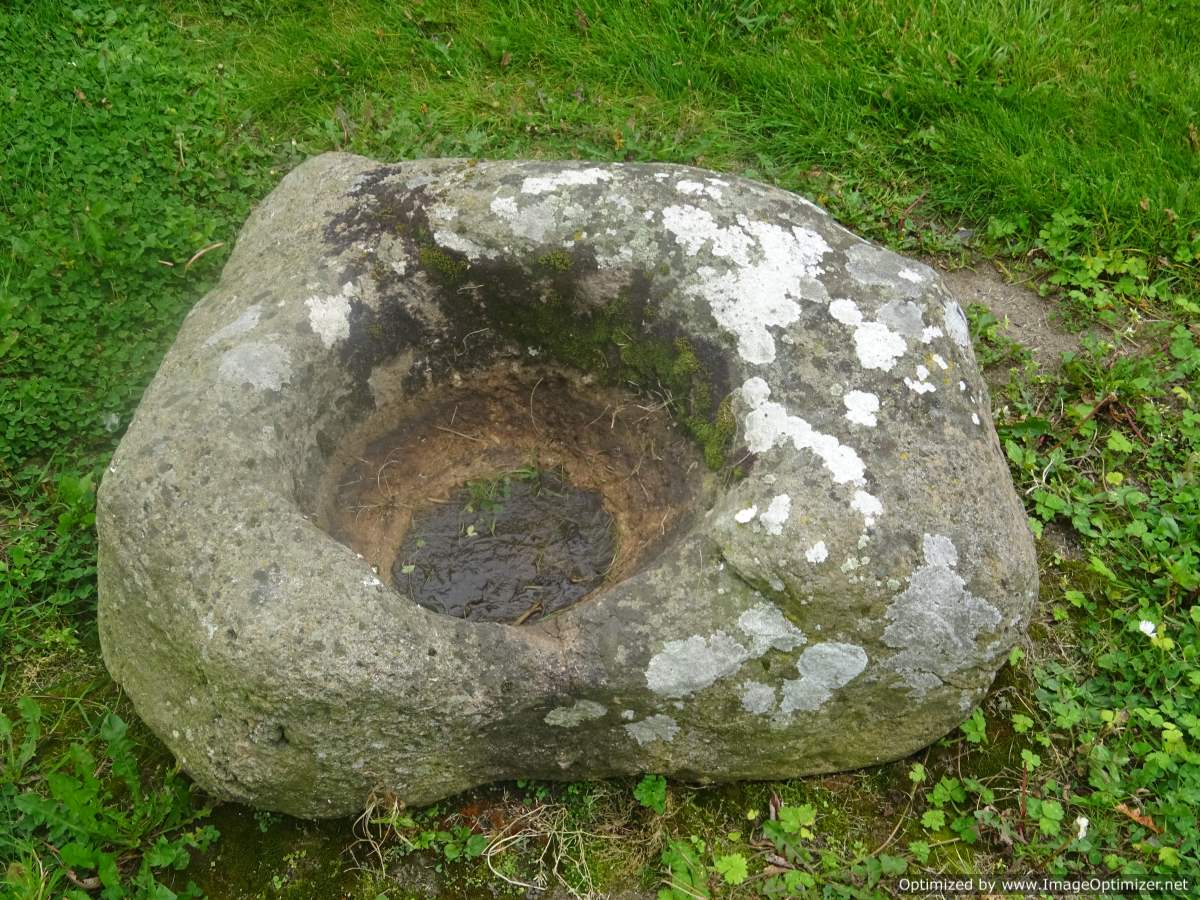
Bullaun in Tramore, Ireland

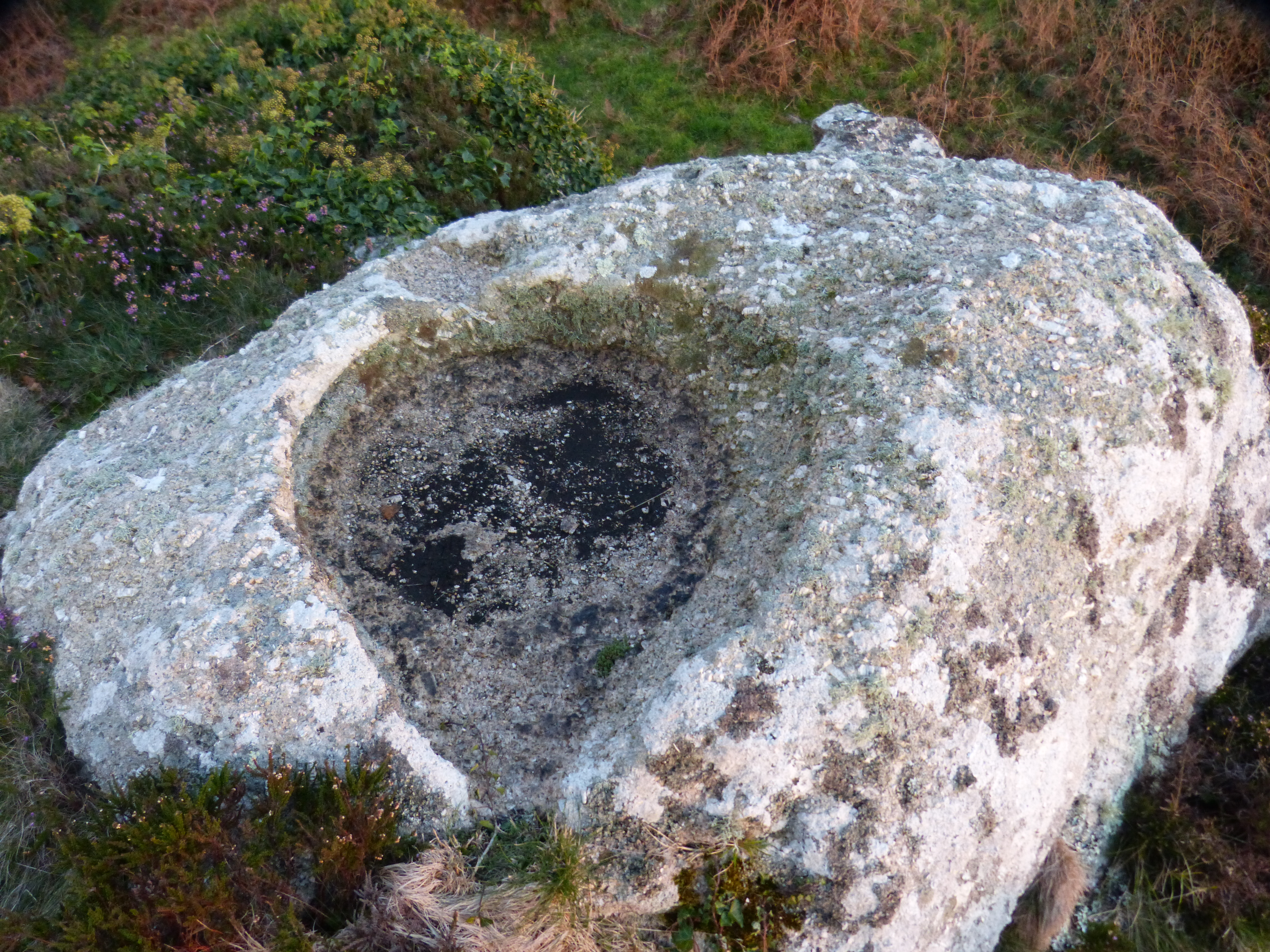
One of several womb shaped bullaun on western end of Rosewall Hill, St Ives, Cornwall, UK

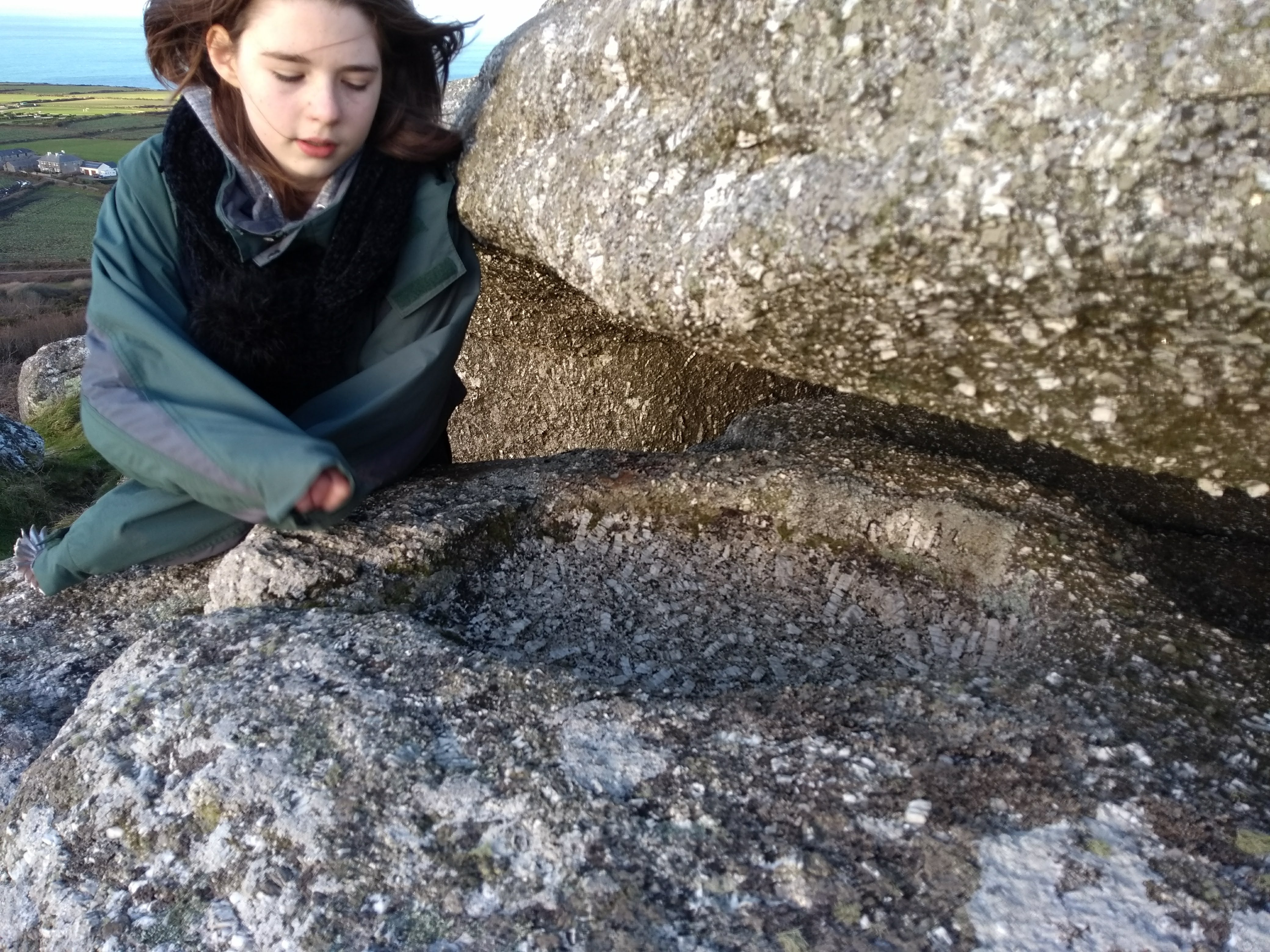
Bullaun on eastern end of Rosewall Hill near St Ives, Cornwall, UK

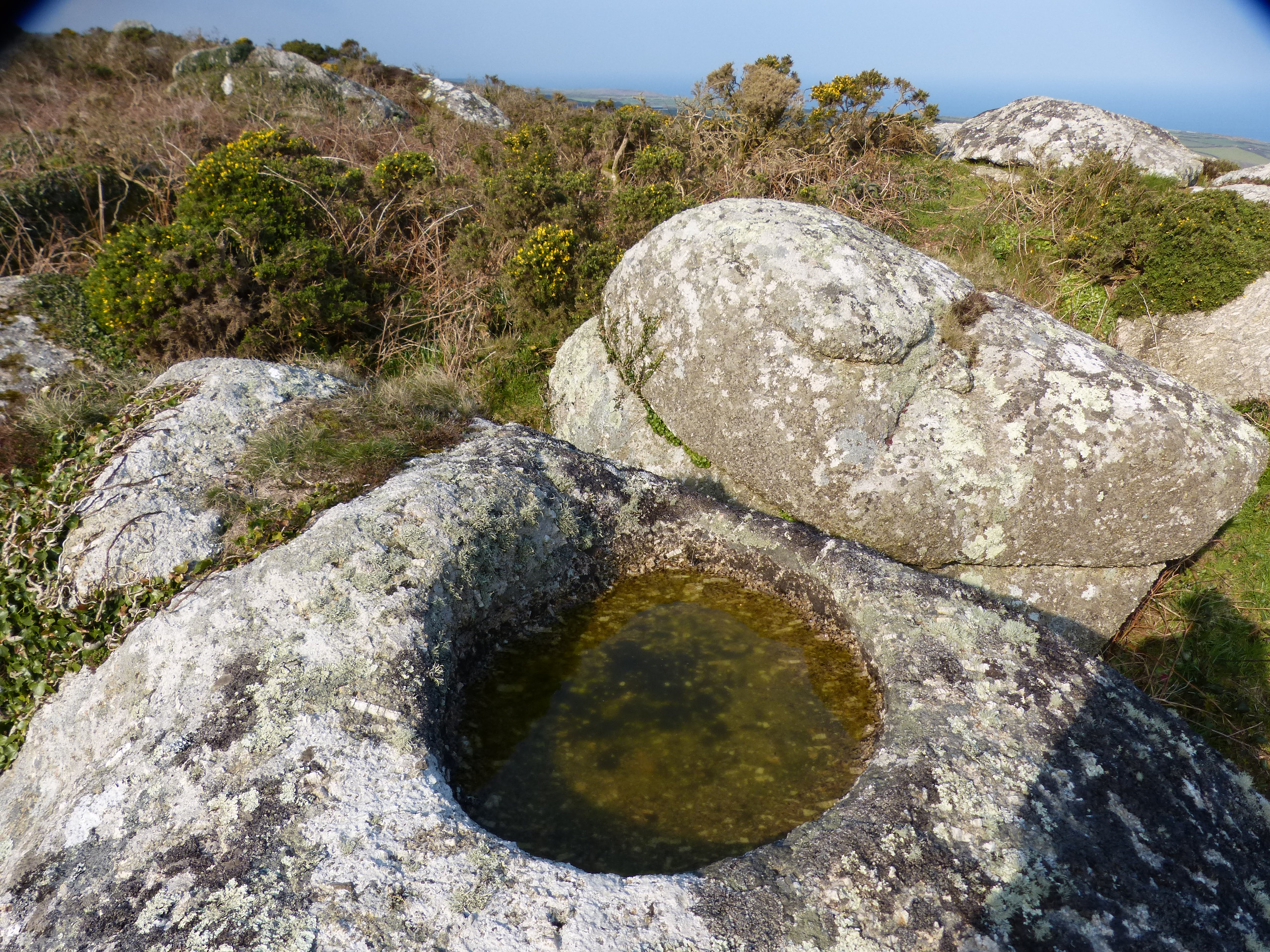
Bullaun on Trevalgan Hill, St Ives, Cornwall, UK

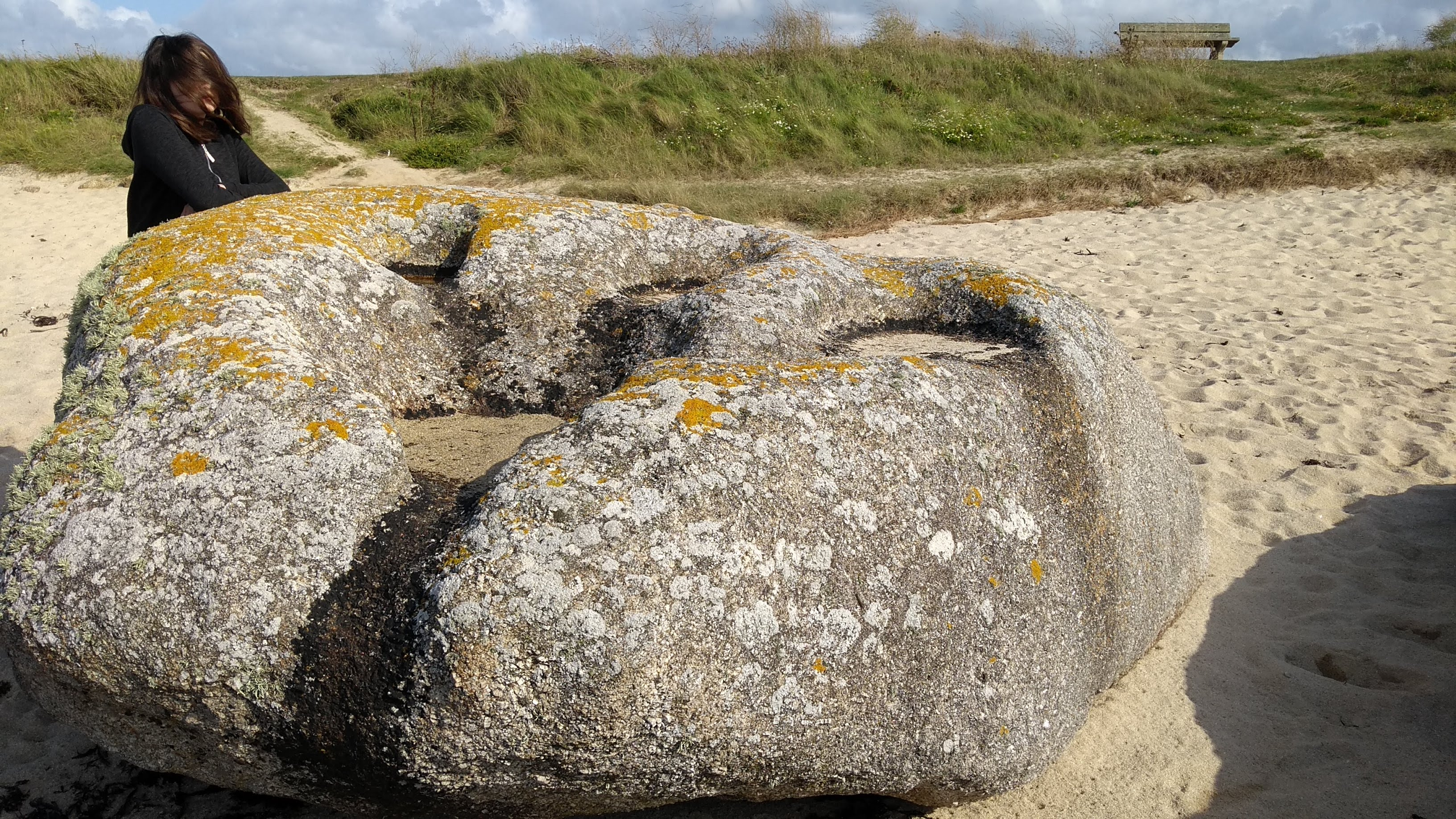
A set of bullaun on Brignogan-Plages, Brittany; erosion or art?

== See also ==
- Rock-cut basin
- Petrosomatoglyph
