= Plounéour-Brignogan-Plages =

- Commune
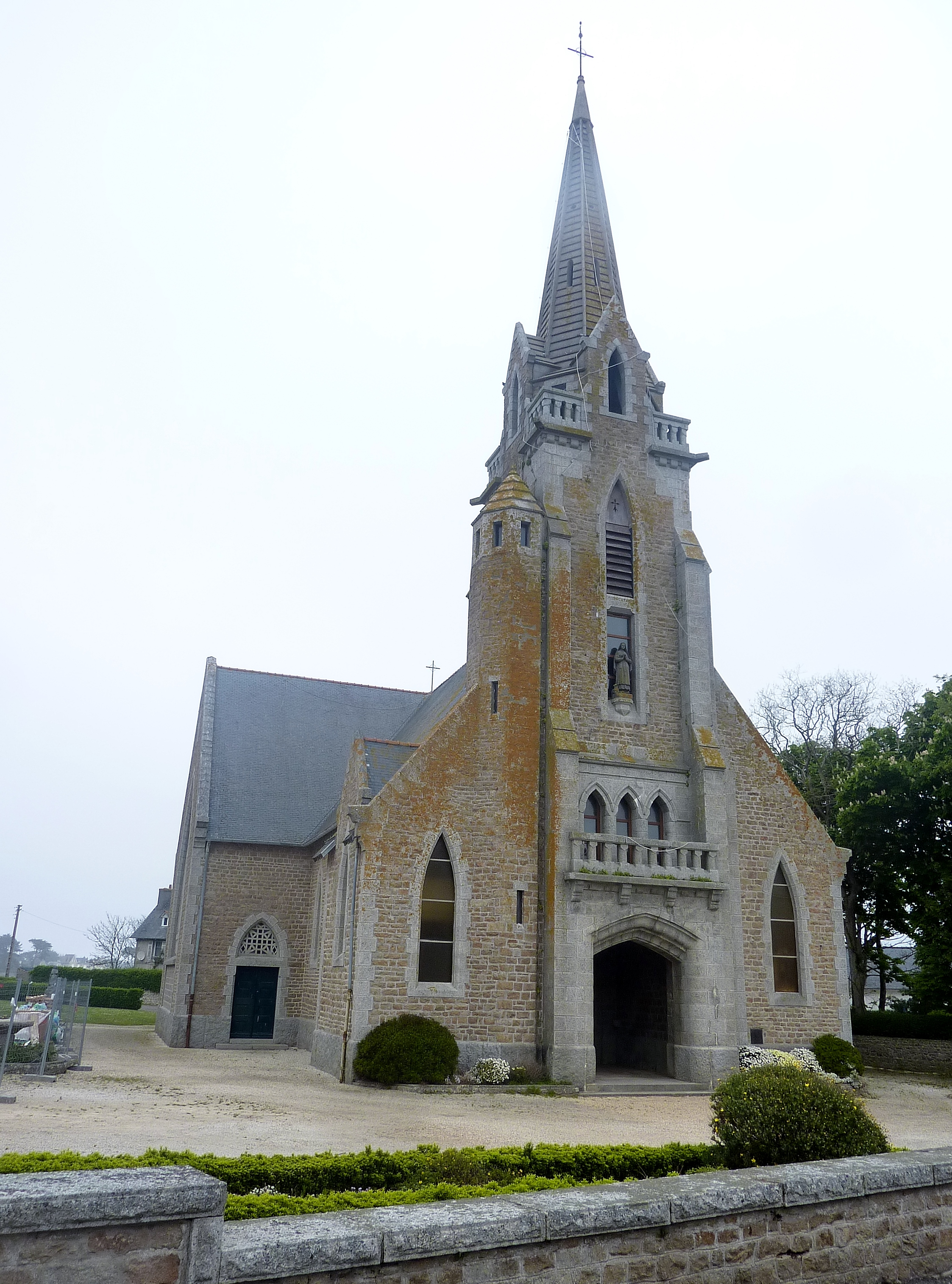
- The church of Brignogan
- Location of Plounéour-Brignogan-Plages
- Location within France Location within Brittany
- Coordinates: 48°39′54″N 4°19′30″W
- Country: France
- Region: Brittany
- Department: Finistère
- Arrondissement: Brest
- Canton: Lesneven
- Intercommunality: Lesneven Côte des Légendes

Government
  - Mayor (2020–2026): Pascal Goulaouic
- Area^{1}: 14.28 km^{2} (5.51 sq mi)
- Population (2023): 1,972
  - Density: 138.1/km^{2} (357.7/sq mi)
- Time zone: UTC+01:00 (CET)
  - Summer (DST): UTC+02:00 (CEST)
- INSEE/Postal code: 29021 /29890
- ^{1} French Land Register data, which excludes lakes, ponds, glaciers > 1 km^{2} (0.386 sq mi or 247 acres) and river estuaries.

Plounéour-Brignogan-Plages (French pronunciation: [pluneuʁ bʁiɲogɑ̃ plaʒ]) is a commune in the department of Finistère, western France. The municipality was established on 1 January 2017 by merger of the former communes of Brignogan-Plages (the seat) and Plounéour-Trez.

== See also ==
- Communes of the Finistère department
