= List of shipwrecks in March 1856 =

The list of shipwrecks in March 1856 includes ships sunk, foundered, grounded, or otherwise lost during March 1856.

== 1 March ==
List of shipwrecks: 1 March 1856
Ship	State	Description
Europa	United Kingdom	The ship was driven ashore and wrecked at Angra do Heroísmo, Terceira Island, Azores. She was on a voyage from Angra do Heroísmo to Queenstown, County Cork.
Meteor	United Kingdom	The barque was wrecked on the Oester Till, off the mouth of the Elbe. Her crew were rescued by the steamship Gitana (Hamburg). Meteor was on a voyage from Pernambuco, Brazil to Hamburg.

== 2 March ==
List of shipwrecks: 2 March 1856
Ship	State	Description
Mermaid	United Kingdom	The ship ran aground on the Pratas Shoal. She was on a voyage from Bombay, India to China. She was set afire by pirates.

== 3 March ==
List of shipwrecks: 3 March 1856
Ship	State	Description
Effort	United Kingdom	The schooner collided with the barque Berbice (United Kingdom) and was abandoned in the Irish Sea 25 nautical miles (46 km) off Bardsey Island, Pembrokeshire. Her crew were rescued by the steamship Rita (United Kingdom). Effort was on a voyage from the Charente to Glasgow, Renfrewshire. She was discovered on 10 March by the tug Rattler, taken in toa and beached at Ballyhack, County Waterford. She was subsequently taken in to Glasgow.
Glen Albyn	United Kingdom	The steamship ran aground and was wrecked on the Westplaat, off Brielle, South Holland, Netherlands. She was on a voyage from Grimsby, Lincolnshire to Rotterdam, South Holland.

== 4 March ==
List of shipwrecks: 4 March 1856
Ship	State	Description
Alice Haviland	United Kingdom	The ship ran aground off Helsingør, Denmark. She was on a voyage from Sunderland, County Durham to Swinemünde, Prussia. She was refloated and resumed her voyage.
David Lyn	United Kingdom	The ship ran aground on the North Reef, off Antigua. She was on a voyage from London to Montego Bay, Jamaica. She had been refloated by 13 March.

== 5 March ==
List of shipwrecks: 5 March 1856
Ship	State	Description
Aurora	United Kingdom	The ship ran aground at Fort Lage, Rio de Janeiro, Brazil. She was on a voyage from Liverpool, Lancashire to Rio de Janeiro. She was refloated the next day and taken in to Rio de Janeiro in a leaky condition.
Drie Gebroders	Netherlands	The full-rigged ship was wrecked on the Goodwin Sands, Kent, United Kingdom. Her crew were rescued by a tug and the Ramsgate Lifeboat. She was on a voyage from Rotterdam, South Holland to Hong Kong.
Estrella	Spain	The ship ran aground in the Magdalena River.
Isabel	Spain	The steamship struck a submerged object and sank at Savanilla, Republic of New Granada.

== 6 March ==
List of shipwrecks: 6 March 1856
Ship	State	Description
Algomah	United States	Carrying general cargo, the 114-foot-9-inch (35 m), 269.14-gross register ton brig was stranded on the Lake Michigan coast of Wisconsin north of Fox Point. Although listed as a total loss, she was refloated, repaired, and returned to service.
Drie Gebroeders	Netherlands	The full-rigged ship was wrecked on the Goodwin Sands, Kent, United Kingdom.
Exchange	United Kingdom	The ship was driven ashore at Port Sigri, Greece. She was on a voyage from London to Constantinople, Ottoman Empire. She had been refloated by 22 March.
Hercus Monte	Prussia	The ship departed from Liverpool, Lancashire, United Kingdom for Königsberg. No further trace, presumed foundered with the loss of all hands.
Lorina Thompson	United Kingdom	The ship was driven ashore 3 nautical miles (5.6 km) east of Mersin, Ottoman Empire. Her crew were rescued. She was on a voyage from Beyrout, Ottoman Syria to Liverpool. She was consequently condemned.
Quito	United Kingdom	The ship ran aground on the James and Mary Sand, in the Hooghly River. She was on a voyage from Calcutta, India to Liverpool. She was refloated and put in to Saugor, India.

== 7 March ==
List of shipwrecks: 7 March 1856
Ship	State	Description
Atala	United Kingdom	The barque was driven ashore and wrecked at Troy, Ottoman Empire.
Cheshire Lass	United Kingdom	The ship sank at Chester, Cheshire. She was on a voyage from London to Chester. She was refloated on 11 March and beached.
Derwent	United Kingdom	The steamship was driven ashore and wrecked in the Bay of Soujak with the loss of a crew member.
Essay	United Kingdom	The brig was wrecked on the Haisborough Sands, in the North Sea off the coast of Norfolk. Her crew were rescued.
General Chassé	United Kingdom	The barque was driven ashore and wrecked at Troy.
Norway	United Kingdom	The ship ran aground on the Haisborough Sands. She was on a voyage from South Shields, County Durham to Genoa, Kingdom of Sardinia. She was refloated and beached at Great Yarmouth, Norfolk in a severely leaky condition. Her crew were rescued. Norway was refloated on 9 March.
Ocean	United Kingdom	The brig was wrecked on the Haisborough Sands. Her crew survived. She was on a voyage from South Shields to London.
Phoenix	United Kingdom	The steamship ran aground in the River Avon. She was on a voyage from Bristol, Gloucestershire to Dublin.
Sultan	United Kingdom	The barque was wrecked on the Haisborough Sands. Her crew were rescued. She was on a voyage from South Shields to Lisbon, Portugal.

== 8 March ==
List of shipwrecks: 8 March 1856
Ship	State	Description
Afina	Sweden	The ship was wrecked at the entrance to the Agger Canal, Denmark with the loss of her captain. She was on a voyage from Hartlepool, County Durham, United Kingdom to Nyköping.
Allport	United Kingdom	The ship struck a sunken rock and was beached at Saint-Gildas, Côtes-du-Nord, France. She was on a voyage from Sunderland, County Durham to Paimbœuf, Loire-Inférieure, France.
Immanuel Kant	Prussia	The ship was driven ashore and wreck on the north coast of Skagen, Denmark. Her crew were rescued. She was on a voyage from London, United Kingdom to Stettin.
Nonpareil	United Kingdom	The ship was destroyed by fire 90 nautical miles (170 km) off Cape Matapan, Greece. Her crew were rescued by Jessie Miller (United Kingdom). Nonpareil was on a voyage from London to Balaklava, Russia.
Union	France	The ship was driven ashore at St. Ives, Cornwall, United Kingdom. She was on a voyage from Swansea, Glamorgan, United Kingdom to Marseille, Bouches-du-Rhône.
Western Bride	United Kingdom	The ship was wrecked in the Strait of Magellan. Her crew were rescued by USS Bainbridge (United States Navy). Western Bride was on a voyage from the Chincha Islands, Peru to Cork.

== 9 March ==
List of shipwrecks: 9 March 1856
Ship	State	Description
Alphonsine Estelle	France	The ship was severely damaged by an explosion of coal gas at Cardiff, Glamorgan, United Kingdom.
Sarah Frances	United Kingdom	The schooner was discovered derelict in the Bristol Channel off Barry, Glamorgan. She was on a voyage from Waterford to Newport, Monmouthshire. She was beached at Penarth, Glamorgan.
Wilhelmina	United Kingdom	The brig was driven ashore at the Darße Ort Lighthouse, Prussia. She was on a voyage from Hamburg to Königsberg Prussia. She broke up on 11 March.

== 10 March ==
List of shipwrecks: 10 March 1856
Ship	State	Description
Advena	United Kingdom	The ship was driven ashore 35 nautical miles (65 km) west of Priene, Ottoman Empire.
Auorkus Month	Prussia	The brig was in collision with another vessel and sank in the English Channel with the loss of all but one of her ten crew. The survivor was rescued the next day by Sandford (United Kingdom). Auorkus Month was on a voyage from Liverpool, Lancashire, United Kingdom to Pillau and Königsberg.
Henry Warburton	United Kingdom	The ship struck rocks and sank at Alexandria, Egypt. She was on a voyage from Newport, Monmouthshire to Alexandria.
Rover	United Kingdom	The sloop was abandoned off Broad Haven, Pembrokeshire.
Sylphiden	Denmark	The schooner ran aground on the Trestein Reef. She was on a voyage from Hartlepool, County Durham, United Kingdom to Copenhagen. She was refloated and taken in to Fredrikshavn.

== 11 March ==
List of shipwrecks: 11 March 1856
Ship	State	Description
Brave	United Kingdom	The sloop was abandoned in the Pentland Firth off Dunnet Head, Caithness. Her crew were rescued.
Palestine	United States	The full-rigged ship foundered in the Indian Ocean. One boat with eight crew on board was reported missing. She was on a voyage from London, United Kingdom to Moulmein, Burma.
Sarah	United Kingdom	The schooner was driven ashore at Teignmouth, Devon. She was on a voyage from Leith, Lothian to Corfu, United States of the Ionian Islands. She was later refloated and taken in to Teignmouth, where she was repaired and returned to service.
Sex Sodskende	Denmark	The ship sprang a leak and sank off the coast of Norway. Her crew were rescued by a Dutch ship. She was on a voyage from Newcastle upon Tyne, Northumberland, United Kingdom to Aalborg.

== 12 March ==
List of shipwrecks: 12 March 1856
Ship	State	Description
Benjamin Scott	United Kingdom	The schooner was severely damaged by fire at Wapping, Middlesex.
Dawson	United Kingdom	The ship was abandoned "in the Sleeve". Her crew were rescued by the brig Zephyr (Denmark). Dawson was on a voyage from Sunderland, County Durham to Swinemünde, Prussia.
Desdemona	United States	The full-rigged ship ran aground on the Stones Reef. She was refloated and beached in St Ives Bay. Desdemona was on a voyage from Havre de Grâce, Seine-Maritime, France to Cardiff, Glamorgan, United Kingdom. She was refloated and taken in to St. Ives, Cornwall in a leaky condition.

== 13 March ==
List of shipwrecks: 13 March 1856
Ship	State	Description
Henry	United Kingdom	The ship was driven ashore at Kessingland, Suffolk. She was on a voyage from London to Montrose, Forfarshire.
Imperatriz	United Kingdom	The transport ship ran aground at Woolwich, Kent and was damaged. She was on a voyage from the Sevastopol, Russia to Woolwich.
Jane	United Kingdom	The ship was driven ashore near Aberthaw, Glamorgan.
Jane McCrea	United Kingdom	The ship struck a submerged object off the Gold Islands and was consequently beached on Owey Island, County Donegal. She was on a voyage from Liverpool, Lancashire to Ballina, County Mayo. She was refloated and taken in to "Ennisco".
Margaret	United Kingdom	The ship ran aground on the Great Burbo Bank, in Liverpool Bay. She was on a voyage from Liverpool to Newport, Monmouthshire. She was refloated the next day and put back to Liverpool.
Mary Ann	United Kingdom	The ship ran aground at the mouth of the Tain Firth. She was on a voyage from Banff, Aberdeenshire to Tain, Ross-shire. She was refloated and assisted in to Littleferry, Sutherland in a sinking condition.
Turk	(United Kingdom of Great Britain and Ireland) Jersey	The ship was driven ashore west of Blakeney, Norfolk. She was on a voyage from Dundee, Forfarshire to Plymouth, Devon.

== 14 March ==
List of shipwrecks: 14 March 1856
Ship	State	Description
Adolph	Hamburg	The ship was wrecked on the Galloper Sand, in the North Sea off the coast of Essex, United Kingdom with the loss of three of her crew. She was on a voyage from Hamburg to West Africa.
Agnes King	United Kingdom	The barque was driven ashore at Constanţa, Ottoman Empire. Her crew were rescued.
Cadet	United Kingdom	The barque was driven ashore at Constanţa. Her crew were rescued.
Canada	United Kingdom	The ship was holed by an anchor and sank at Sunderland, County Durham.
Catherine	Austrian Empire	The ship was driven ashore and wrecked at Constanţa.
Constantine	United Kingdom	The barque was driven ashore at Constanţa. Her crew were rescued.
Courrier de Fiume	France	The ship was driven ashore at Constanţa. Her crew were either rescued or drowned.
Eliza Anna	United Kingdom	The brig was driven ashore at Constanţa. Her crew were rescued.
Emily Kate	United Kingdom	The brig was driven ashore at Constanţa. Her crew were rescued.
Felix	France	The ship was wrecked on the Fish Key. She was on a voyage from Port-au-Prince, Haiti to Havre de Grâce, Seine-Inférieure.
Hero	United Kingdom	The schooner was driven into a brig and was run ashore at Lowestoft, Suffolk. She was on a voyage from Rye, Sussex to Newcastle upon Tyne, Northumberland.
Jane Morrison	United Kingdom	The ship was driven ashore in Kazatch Bay, Russia.
March Hixon	United Kingdom	The barque was driven ashore at Constanţa. Her crew survived.
Mary Hudson	United Kingdom	The brig was driven ashore at Constanţa. Her crew were rescued.
Snarebrook	United Kingdom	The barque was driven ashore at Constanţa. Her crew were rescued.
Ville de Dunkerque	France	The ship was driven ashore at Constanţa. Her crew were rescued.
Voile, or Volante	France	The ship was driven ashore at Constanţa. Her crew were rescued.
Wave	United Kingdom	The brig was driven ashore at Constanţa. Her crew were rescued.
William	United Kingdom	The brig was driven ashore at Constanţa. Her crew were rescued.
Zealous	United Kingdom	The barque was driven ashore at Constanţa. Her crew were rescued.
Zenobia	United Kingdom	The ship ran aground on the Gingerbread Grounds. She was on a voyage from Liverpool, Lancashire to New Orleans. She was later refloated and taken in to Nassau, Bahamas.

== 15 March ==
List of shipwrecks: 15 March 1856
Ship	State	Description
Daisy	United Kingdom	The sloop was driven ashore and wrecked at Berwick upon Tweed, Northumberland.
Edward	United Kingdom	The schooner ran aground at Wexford. She was on a voyage from Newport, Monmouthshire to Wexford.
Grenette	Netherlands	The hoy was lost off Great Yarmouth, Norfolk, United Kingdom.
Grouse	United Kingdom	The ship was driven ashore at Lowestoft, Suffolk. She was on a voyage from Rye, Sussex to Sunderland, County Durham.
Leon	Spain	The ship was wrecked on the Gallope Sand, in the North Sea off the coast of Essex, United Kingdom. Her crew were rescued. She was on a voyage from Hamburg to Havana, Cuba.
New Jersey	United States	New Jersey. The steamboat caught fire and sank at Philadelphia, Pennsylvania with the loss of 50 lives. She was on a voyage from Philadelphia to Camden, New Jersey.
Spermaceti	United Kingdom	The ship was driven ashore at Kazatch, Russia.
Virtue	United Kingdom	The sloop was run into by HMS Resolute (Royal Navy) and sank at Kingstown, County Dublin.
Vivid	United Kingdom	The schooner ran aground at Wexford. She was on a voyage from Newport to Wexford.

== 16 March ==
List of shipwrecks: 16 March 1856
Ship	State	Description
Alfred	Hamburg	The ship was wrecked on the Middleton Sands, in the North Sea off the coast of County Durham, United Kingdom.
Ann and Margaret	United Kingdom	The ship was driven ashore and damaged at Beaumaris, Anglesey.
Blake	United Kingdom	The barque was abandoned in the Atlantic Ocean with the loss of nine of her seventeen crew. Survivors were rescued on 2 April by the schooner Pigeon (United Kingdom). Blake was on a voyage from Ship Island, Newfoundland, British North America to Liverpool, Lancashire.
Dalton	United Kingdom	The ship was driven ashore at Beaumaris.
Ed	United Kingdom	The ship ran aground on the Gabbard Sand, off the north Kent coast. She was on a voyage from Hamburg to Liverpool, Lancashire. She was refloated and taken in to Ramsgate, Kent in a severely leaky condition.
Edouard	Belgium	The ship was driven ashore at Beaumaris. She was refloated the next day.
Edward	Belgium	The ship was driven ashore at Beaumaris, Anglesey, United Kingdom. She was on a voyage from Ghent, West Flanders to Liverpool, Lancashire, United Kingdom.
Elizabeth Abram	United Kingdom	The ship was driven ashore and damaged at Beaumaris.
Ellen	United Kingdom	The ship was driven ashore and damaged at Beaumaris.
Endeavour	United Kingdom	The ship was driven ashore at Beaumaris.
Mary and Elizabeth	United Kingdom	The ship was driven ashore and damaged at Beaumaris.
Messenger	United Kingdom	The schooner ran aground on the Hook Sand, in the English Channel off the coast of Dorset. She was on a voyage from Havre de Grâce, Seine-Inférieure, France to Poole, Dorset.
Sarah	United Kingdom	The brig was wrecked at Teignmouth, Devon. Her crew survived.

== 17 March ==
List of shipwrecks: 17 March 1856
Ship	State	Description
Charles Molloy	United Kingdom	The brig was driven ashore and wrecked at Hartlepool, County Durham.
Thessaly	United Kingdom	The ship was abandoned in the Atlantic Ocean 500 nautical miles (930 km) west of Cape Clear Island, County Cork. Her crew were rescued by Northland (United Kingdom). Thessaly was on a voyage from New Orleans, Louisiana, United States to Liverpool, Lancashire.

== 18 March ==
List of shipwrecks: 18 March 1856
Ship	State	Description
Curlew	United Kingdom	The steamship was wrecked near Bermuda. Her crew were rescued. She was on a voyage from Halifax, Nova Scotia, British North America to Bermuda.
Hibernia	United Kingdom	The steamship ran aground at Dublin. She was on a voyage from Dublin to Liverpool, Lancashire. She was refloated the next day and resumed her voyage.

== 19 March ==
List of shipwrecks: 19 March 1856
Ship	State	Description
Genevieve	France	The ship was driven ashore and wrecked at Agde, Hérault. Her crew were rescued. She was on a voyage from Toulon, Var to Saint-Pierre, Martinique.
Philadelphia	United States	The ship ran aground at the mouth of the Delaware River.
Shamrock	United Kingdom	The schooner was driven ashore and wrecked 5 nautical miles (9.3 km) north of Scarborough, Yorkshire. Her crew were rescued.

== 20 March ==
List of shipwrecks: 20 March 1856
Ship	State	Description
Ellas	Greece	The brig was wrecked at Jaffa, Ottoman Syria. Her crew were rescued.
Jessica	United Kingdom	The barque, with wheat, was wrecked at Jaffa in a gale. Her crew were rescued.
Raymond	France	The brig was driven ashore and wrecked at the Maguelone Cathedral, Hérault. Her crew were rescued.
Silistra	United Kingdom	The ship ran aground on the West Hoyle Bank, in Liverpool Bay. She was on a voyage from New Orleans, Louisiana, United States to Liverpool, Lancashire. She was refloated and taken in to Liverpool.

== 21 March ==
List of shipwrecks: 21 March 1856
Ship	State	Description
Ardent	France	The brig was abandoned in the Atlantic Ocean. Her crew were rescued by Helvitia (France).
Danube	United Kingdom	The brig was abandoned in the Atlantic Ocean (41°N 33°W) after becoming disabled and three crew washed away, on a voyage from Matanzas, Cuba to Leith, Lothian. The remaining crew were rescued by Early Bird (United Kingdom).
Finance	United Kingdom	The brig foundered in the Mediterranean Sea (38°00′N 7°39′E). Her crew were rescued by the barque Landar (Norway). Finance was on a voyage from an English port to Agrigento, Sicily, or from Agrigento to the River Tyne.
Progress	United Kingdom	The ship was destroyed by fire at Constanţa, Ottoman Empire.

== 22 March ==
List of shipwrecks: 22 March 1856
Ship	State	Description
Alexandre	Netherlands	The steamship was holed by her anchor and sank in Restronguet Creek. She was on a voyage from Amsterdam, North Holland to Alexandria, Egypt.

== 24 March ==
List of shipwrecks: 24 March 1856
Ship	State	Description
Concord, and Vasco de Gama	United Kingdom	The schooner Concord collided with the steamship Vasco de Gama and sank off The Cumbraes, Ayrshire. Her four crew were rescued by Vasco de Gama. Concord was on a voyage from Bangor, Caernarfonshire to Fisherrow, Lothian. Vasco de Gama was on a voyage from Glasgow, Renfrewshire to Lisbon, Portugal. She put back to Glasgow in a severely damaged condition.
Ernest	France	The brig struck the Seven Stones Reef and was damaged. She was on a voyage from Llanelly, Glamorgan, United Kingdom to Saint-Vaast-la-Hougue, Manche. She put in to St. Ives, Cornwall, United Kingdom in a sinking condition.
Lyra	United Kingdom	The ship ran aground on the Barber Sand, in the North Sea off the coast of Norfolk. She was on a voyage from London to Hartlepool, County Durham. She was refloated.
Renshaw	United Kingdom	The ship was driven ashore at Mogador, Morocco. She was on a voyage from Mogador to London. She was refloated on 15 April.

== 25 March ==
List of shipwrecks: 25 March 1856
Ship	State	Description
Smyrna	United Kingdom	The ship collided with Giaour (United Kingdom) and foundered in the Atlantic Ocean. Her crew were rescued by Gioaur. Smyrna was on a voyage from the Rio Grande to Queenstown, County Cork.
Victoria	United Kingdom	The ship sprang a leak and sank at Barcelona, Spain. Her crew were rescued. She was on a voyage from Sunderland, County Durham to Barcelona.

== 26 March ==
List of shipwrecks: 26 March 1856
Ship	State	Description
Amalia	United Kingdom	The ship was lost whilst on a voyage from the Danube to a British port. Her crew were rescued.
Osprey	United States	The steamship caught fire at Kingston, Jamaica and was scuttled. She was on a voyage from Santa Marta, Republic of New Granada to New York.
Tigress	United States	The full-rigged ship was holed by ice and sank in the Delaware River near Newcastle, Delaware. She was on a voyage from Philadelphia, Pennsylvania to Liverpool, Lancashire, United Kingdom of Great Britain and Ireland.

== 27 March ==
List of shipwrecks: 27 March 1856
Ship	State	Description
Active	United Kingdom	The ship ran aground at the mouth of the Orne. She was on a voyage from Seaham, County Durham to Caen, Calvados, France.
Boomerang	United Kingdom	The full-rigged ship was abandoned in the Atlantic Ocean. Nineteen of her crew were rescued by Helen R. Cooper (United States). Five crew were taken off on 30 March by American Congress (United States). Boomerang was on a voyage from Mobile, Alabama, United States to Liverpool, Lancashire.
Ellen	United Kingdom	The sloop struck a sunken rock and foundered in the Isles of Scilly. Her crew were rescued by G. F. Patten (Flag unknown). Ellen was on a voyage from Bangor, Caernarfonshire to Southampton, Hampshire.
Hamoody	United Kingdom	The ship was destroyed by fire at Cochin, India.
Hermes	United Kingdom	The ship was wrecked on the Kettle's Bottom Rock, in Whitesand Bay with the loss of six of her nine crew. Survivors were rescued by Cyrus (United Kingdom). Hermes was on a voyage from Cardiff, Glamorgan to London.
Isabella	United Kingdom	The schooner struck rocks and sank off Islay, Inner Hebrides. Her crew were rescued. She was on a voyage from Newcastle upon Tyne, Northumberland to an Irish port.
Remembrance	United Kingdom	The brig ran aground off Dunkirk, Nord, France. She was on a voyage from St. Jean d'Acre, Ottoman Syria to Antwerp, Belgium. She was refloated and put in to Boulogne, Pas-de-Calais, France in a leaky condition.
Rothsay	United Kingdom	The ship was abandoned on the Grand Banks of Newfoundland with the loss of a crew member. Survivors were rescued by Somerville (United Kingdom). Rothsay was on a voyage from Liverpool to Halifax, Nova Scotia, British North America.

== 28 March ==
List of shipwrecks: 28 March 1856
Ship	State	Description
Jane	United Kingdom	The brig ran aground at Sunderland, County Durham. She was on a voyage from London to Sunderland. She was refloated and towed in to Sunderland, but struck the quayside and severely damaged her stern.
Joseph Wheeler	United Kingdom	The ship was abandoned at sea. Her crew were rescued by Caroline (United Kingdom). Joseph Wheeler was on a voyage from "Matacon" to Marseille, Bouches-du-Rhône, France.
Paramatta	United Kingdom	The barque was driven ashore at Calamata, near Gallipoli, Ottoman Empire. She was on a voyage from Liverpool to Constantinople, Ottoman Empire.
Sea Witch	United States	The clipper ship was wrecked on a coral reef 12 nautical miles (22 km) west of Havana, Cuba. All on board were rescued, while under command of Captain Lang, with approximately 500 coolies on board. She was on a voyage from Amoy, China to Havana.

== 29 March ==
List of shipwrecks: 29 March 1856
Ship	State	Description
Chrysolite	United Kingdom	The ship was sighted in the Strait of Sunda whilst on a voyage from Singapore, Straits Settlements to Liverpool, Lancashire. No further trace, presumed foundered with the loss of all hands.
Miño	Spain	The steamship collided with the transport ship Minden (United Kingdom) and sank off Tarifa, Spain, with the loss of 94 of the 115 people on board. The survivors were rescued by Minden. Miño was on a voyage from Barcelona to Liverpool, Lancashire, United Kingdom.
Wilberforce	United Kingdom	The ship sprang a leak and was beached at Lisbon, Portugal. She was on a voyage from Newcastle upon Tyne, Northumberland to Cartagena, Spain.
Mexican Packet	United Kingdom	The ship departed from Trieste for Liverpool. No further trace, presumed foundered with the loss of all hands.

== 30 March ==
List of shipwrecks: 30 March 1856
Ship	State	Description
Alert	United Kingdom	The dandy smack was driven ashore at Kingsgate, Kent. She was on a voyage from London to Dartmouth, Devon. She was refloated the next day and taken in to Margate, Kent.
Queen Victoria	United Kingdom	The barque was abandoned in the Atlantic Ocean. Her crew were rescued by Squando (United States). Queen Victoria was on a voyage from Savannah, Georgia, United States to Bristol, Gloucestershire.
William	United Kingdom	The polacca struck the Pearl Rocks, off the coast of Cornwall and sank. Her crew were rescued. She was on a voyage from Newport, Monmouthshire to Plymouth, Devon.

== 31 March ==
List of shipwrecks: 31 March 1856
Ship	State	Description
British Queen	United Kingdom	The barque was driven ashore and wrecked between Cap Riog and Punta Prima, Menorca, Spain. She was on a voyage from Malta to "Ivica".
Leo	United Kingdom	The ship was driven ashore and wrecked at Løkken-Vrå, Denmark. Her crew were rescued. She was on a voyage from Hull, Yorkshire to Swinemünde.
Martha Brader	United Kingdom	The schooner ran aground on the Trinity Sand, in the North Sea off the coast of Lincolnshire. She was on a voyage from Grimbsy, Lincolnshire to Newcastle upon Tyne, Northumberland.
Timandra	United Kingdom	The schooner caught fire and put in to Milos, Greece and was scuttled. She was on a voyage from London to Balaklava, Russia. She was later refloated and taken in to Syros, Greece for repairs.
White Star	United Kingdom	The full-rigged ship was driven ashore at Mobile, Alabama, United States. She was refloated.

== Unknown date ==
List of shipwrecks: Unknown date in March 1856
Ship	State	Description
Esk	United Kingdom	The steamship was wrecked by ice at Kertch, Russia between 14 and 19 March.
Glenmore	United Kingdom	The ship was lost a Yevpatoria, Russia before 18 March.
James	(United Kingdom of Great Britain and Ireland) British North America	The barque was abandoned in the Atlantic Ocean.
Lightfoot	(United Kingdom of Great Britain and Ireland) British North America	The ship capsized in the Atlantic Ocean with the loss of all but one of those on board. She was on a voyage from Halifax, Nova Scotia to Barbados.
Lune	United Kingdom	The ship was wrecked at Plounéour-Trez, Finistère, France. Her crew were rescued. She was on a voyage from South Shields, County Durham to Cartagena, Spain.
Marquez d'Olinda	Brazil	The steamship was wrecked in The Guianas.
Medora	United Kingdom	The ship ran aground on Ramsey Island, Pembrokeshire. She was on a voyage from Milford Haven, Pembrokeshire to Hull, Yorkshire. She was refloated and put back to Milford Haven in a leaky condition.
Moro Castle	(United Kingdom of Great Britain and Ireland) British North America	The ship was abandoned in the Atlantic Ocean before 27 March.
Pursuit	United Kingdom	The ship was abandoned in the Atlantic Ocean 80 nautical miles (150 km) south west of Flores Island, Azores. She was on a voyage from Matanzas, Cuba to the Clyde.
Samuel Hendricus	Netherlands	The ship ran aground on the Pampoes Sand, in the North Sea off the coast of Zeeland. She was on a voyage from Rotterdam, South Holland to Batavia, Netherlands East Indies. She was refloated and resumed her voyage, but put in to Penzance, Cornwall, United Kingdom on 18 March in a leaky condition.
Seaton Sluice	United Kingdom	The ship foundered in the Black Sea with the loss of a crew member.
Varoon	United Kingdom	The clipper ship was wrecked between Cape Northumberland and Rivoli Bay, South Australia with the loss of all on board. She was on a voyage from Manila, Spanish East Indies to Sydney, New South Wales.
Woodbridge	United Kingdom	The ship was wrecked on the Oyster Reef before 22 March. She was on a voyage from London to Akyab, Burma.
