= Brignogan-Plages =

Commune in Finistère, France

Brignogan-Plages Brignogan
- Part of Plounéour-Brignogan-Plages
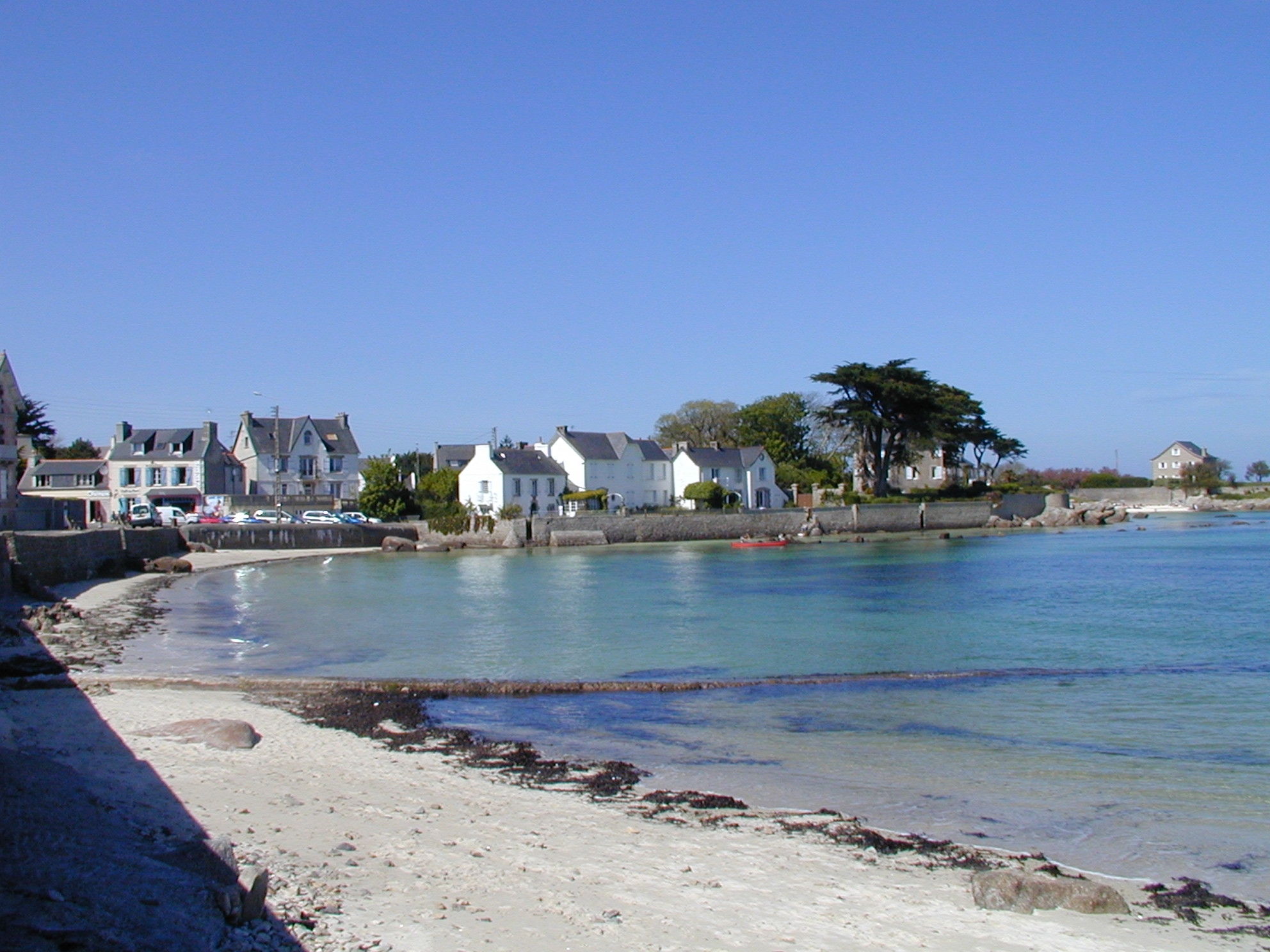
- The beach at Brignogan-Plages
- Location of Brignogan-Plages
- Location within France Location within Brittany
- Coordinates: 48°39′55″N 4°19′29″W
- Country: France
- Region: Brittany
- Department: Finistère
- Arrondissement: Brest
- Canton: Lesneven
- Commune: Plounéour-Brignogan-Plages
- Area^{1}: 3.60 km^{2} (1.39 sq mi)
- Highest elevation: 25 m (82 ft)
- Lowest elevation: 0 m (0 ft)
- Population (2022): 752
  - Density: 209/km^{2} (541/sq mi)
- Time zone: UTC+01:00 (CET)
  - Summer (DST): UTC+02:00 (CEST)
- Postal code: 29890
- ^{1} French Land Register data, which excludes lakes, ponds, glaciers > 1 km^{2} (0.386 sq mi or 247 acres) and river estuaries.

Brignogan-Plages (or simply Brignogan) (French pronunciation: [bʁiɲogɑ̃ plaʒ]; Breton: Brignogan) is a former commune in the Finistère department of Brittany in north-western France. On 1 January 2017, it was merged into the new commune Plounéour-Brignogan-Plages.

Brignogan is 32 kilometres from Brest. Submarine telegraph cables between Cornwall and France came ashore at Brignogan.

== Climate ==
Brignogan-Plages has an oceanic climate (Köppen climate classification Cfb). The average annual temperature in Brignogan-Plages is 12.1 °C (53.8 °F). The average annual rainfall is 908.0 mm (35.75 in) with December as the wettest month. The temperatures are highest on average in August, at around 14.1 °C (57.4 °F), and lowest in February, at around 7.9 °C (46.2 °F). The highest temperature ever recorded in Brignogan-Plages was 32.6 °C (90.7 °F) on 2 August 1990; the coldest temperature ever recorded was −7.0 °C (19.4 °F) on 12 January 1987.

Climate data for Brignogan-Plages (1981–2010 averages, extremes 1982−2018)
Month	Jan	Feb	Mar	Apr	May	Jun	Jul	Aug	Sep	Oct	Nov	Dec	Year
Record high °C (°F)	17.9 (64.2)	19.6 (67.3)	24.0 (75.2)	24.5 (76.1)	29.1 (84.4)	32.0 (89.6)	30.4 (86.7)	32.6 (90.7)	30.3 (86.5)	29.3 (84.7)	21.7 (71.1)	19.0 (66.2)	32.6 (90.7)
Mean daily maximum °C (°F)	10.1 (50.2)	10.1 (50.2)	11.6 (52.9)	12.7 (54.9)	15.0 (59.0)	17.4 (63.3)	19.2 (66.6)	19.6 (67.3)	18.3 (64.9)	16.0 (60.8)	12.8 (55.0)	10.8 (51.4)	14.5 (58.1)
Daily mean °C (°F)	7.9 (46.2)	7.9 (46.2)	9.2 (48.6)	10.2 (50.4)	12.6 (54.7)	14.9 (58.8)	16.6 (61.9)	16.9 (62.4)	15.7 (60.3)	13.4 (56.1)	10.5 (50.9)	8.6 (47.5)	12.1 (53.8)
Mean daily minimum °C (°F)	5.7 (42.3)	5.6 (42.1)	6.8 (44.2)	7.6 (45.7)	10.2 (50.4)	12.4 (54.3)	14.0 (57.2)	14.1 (57.4)	13.0 (55.4)	10.9 (51.6)	8.3 (46.9)	6.4 (43.5)	9.6 (49.3)
Record low °C (°F)	−7.0 (19.4)	−5.0 (23.0)	−1.7 (28.9)	1.2 (34.2)	3.1 (37.6)	5.6 (42.1)	9.2 (48.6)	8.8 (47.8)	7.0 (44.6)	1.1 (34.0)	−0.5 (31.1)	−3.4 (25.9)	−7.0 (19.4)
Average precipitation mm (inches)	107.8 (4.24)	86.1 (3.39)	69.8 (2.75)	66.3 (2.61)	61.4 (2.42)	43.2 (1.70)	48.5 (1.91)	50.8 (2.00)	56.7 (2.23)	99.8 (3.93)	104.2 (4.10)	113.4 (4.46)	908.0 (35.75)
Average precipitation days (≥ 1.0 mm)	16.7	13.3	12.4	12.0	10.1	7.8	8.2	8.7	8.9	13.6	16.1	16.4	144.2
Source: Météo France

== Population ==
Inhabitants of Brignogan-Plages are called Brignoganais in French.

== See also ==
- Communes of the Finistère department
