= Plounéour-Trez =

Plounéour-Trez Plouneour-Traezh
- Part of Plounéour-Brignogan-Plages
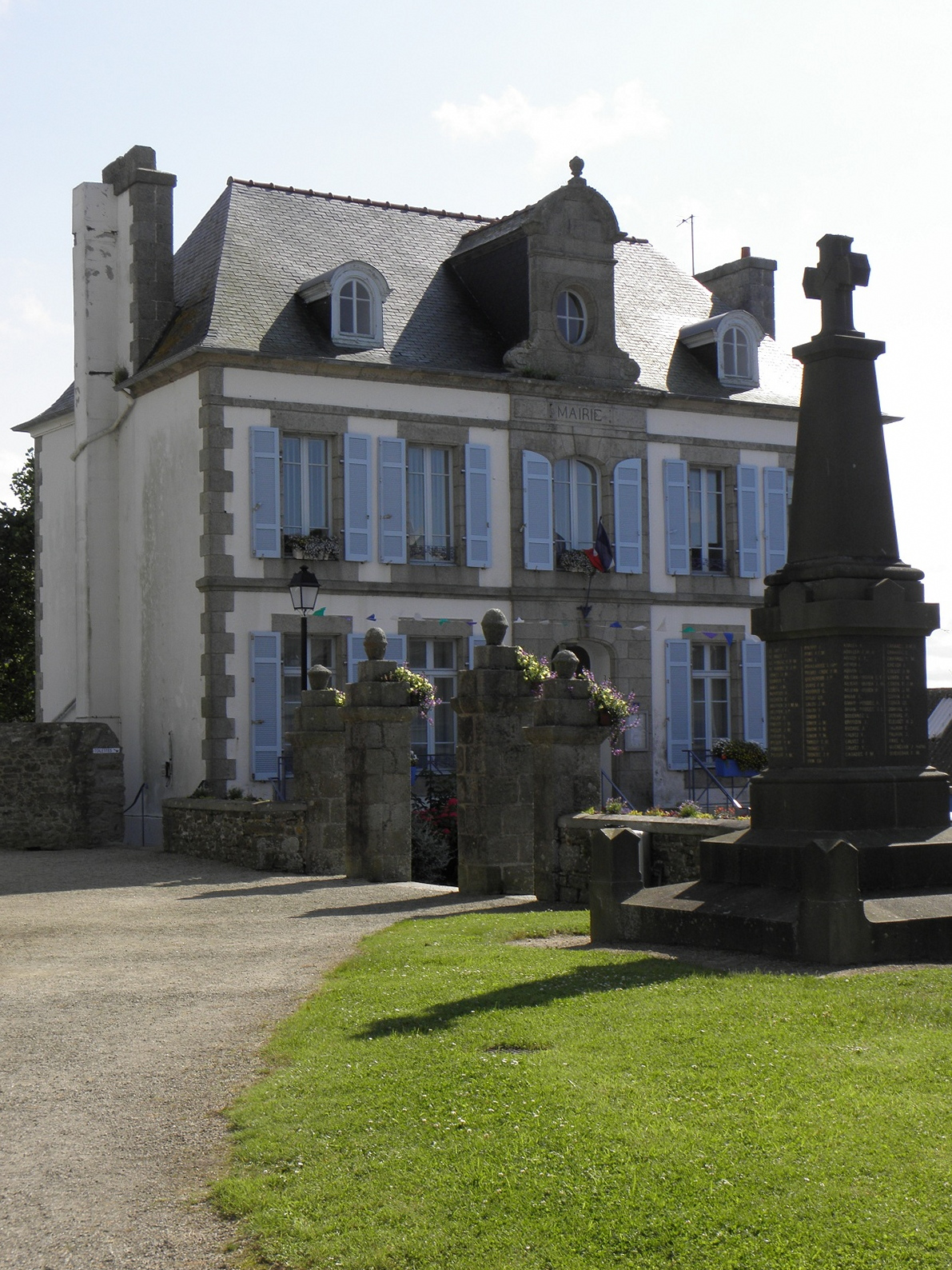
- The town hall in Plounéour-Trez
- Location of Plounéour-Trez
- Location within France Location within Brittany
- Coordinates: 48°39′06″N 4°19′01″W
- Country: France
- Region: Brittany
- Department: Finistère
- Arrondissement: Brest
- Canton: Lesneven
- Commune: Plounéour-Brignogan-Plages
- Area^{1}: 10.68 km^{2} (4.12 sq mi)
- Highest elevation: 64 m (210 ft)
- Lowest elevation: 0 m (0 ft)
- Population (2022): 1,203
  - Density: 112.6/km^{2} (291.7/sq mi)
- Time zone: UTC+01:00 (CET)
  - Summer (DST): UTC+02:00 (CEST)
- Postal code: 29890
- ^{1} French Land Register data, which excludes lakes, ponds, glaciers > 1 km^{2} (0.386 sq mi or 247 acres) and river estuaries.

Plounéour-Trez (French pronunciation: [pluneuʁ tʁɛs]; Breton: Plouneour-Traezh) is a former commune in the Finistère department of Brittany in north-western France. On 1 January 2017, it was merged into the new commune Plounéour-Brignogan-Plages.

== Population ==
Inhabitants of Plounéour-Trez are called in French Plounéour-Tréziens.

== See also ==
- Communes of the Finistère department
