= CAAF =

CAAF is an abbreviation that may mean:

- Caaf Water, a river in western Scotland
- Česká asociace amerického fotbalu (ČAAF), organizers of the Czech League of American Football
- Children Affected by AIDS Foundation
- Civil Aviation Authority of Fiji
- Courtland Army Airfield
- United States Court of Appeals for the Armed Forces
- Coalition Against Ad Fraud
