= Children Affected by AIDS Foundation =

Former nonprofit organization

The Children Affected by AIDS Foundation (CAAF) was an organization to providing social, educational, recreational and other critical support programs to vulnerable children impacted by HIV/AIDS in the U.S. and other countries. CAAF pursued its mission to help HIV-impacted children domestically and abroad through four district programs.

CAAF was merged into Keep a Child Alive in 2012.

== Mission ==
The mission of the Children Affected by AIDS Foundation (CAAF) was to make a positive difference in the lives of children infected with HIV and affected by AIDS.

== U.S. Initiatives ==
1. Camp Network - Allow more children affected by AIDS to attend summer camp by making grants, facilitating communication between agencies helping such children to attend a camp, developing new camps, and hosting meetings of camp providers to enhance the experience of children affected by AIDS.
2. Family Assistance - Families who experience financial hardships as a result of medical bills or other expenses brought on by the impact of HIV/AIDS often request relief from their local social services agencies. CAAF awarded small grants to these agencies for the immediate use by families.

== Latin America and Caribbean Program ==
In collaboration with a local partner, the foundation implemented its Prevention by Intervention initiative in 22 healthcare sites in Guatemala. The initiative promoted HIV awareness, access to HIV pre- and post-test counseling for pregnant woman and rapid HIV testing to prevent children from being born with the virus. As a result, Prevention by Intervention decreased the rates of mother to child transmission of HIV and consequently AIDS orphanhood in Guatemala.

CAAF entered the Latin American and Caribbean (LAC) region in 2005 and assisted more than 28,000 children in 2008. CAAF worked in Brazil to accelerate adoption procedures and offer legal aid to families adopting AIDS-orphaned children. Food was supplied and psychological support services were provided for Argentinean families affected by AIDS. In Peru, CAAF engaged healthcare workers, families, and children to promote medication adherence, among other programs.

CAAF's international efforts have given funds to 31 nonprofits to support care, stability and well-being of Latin American and Caribbean children who are infected, affected or orphaned by HIV/AIDS.

== History ==
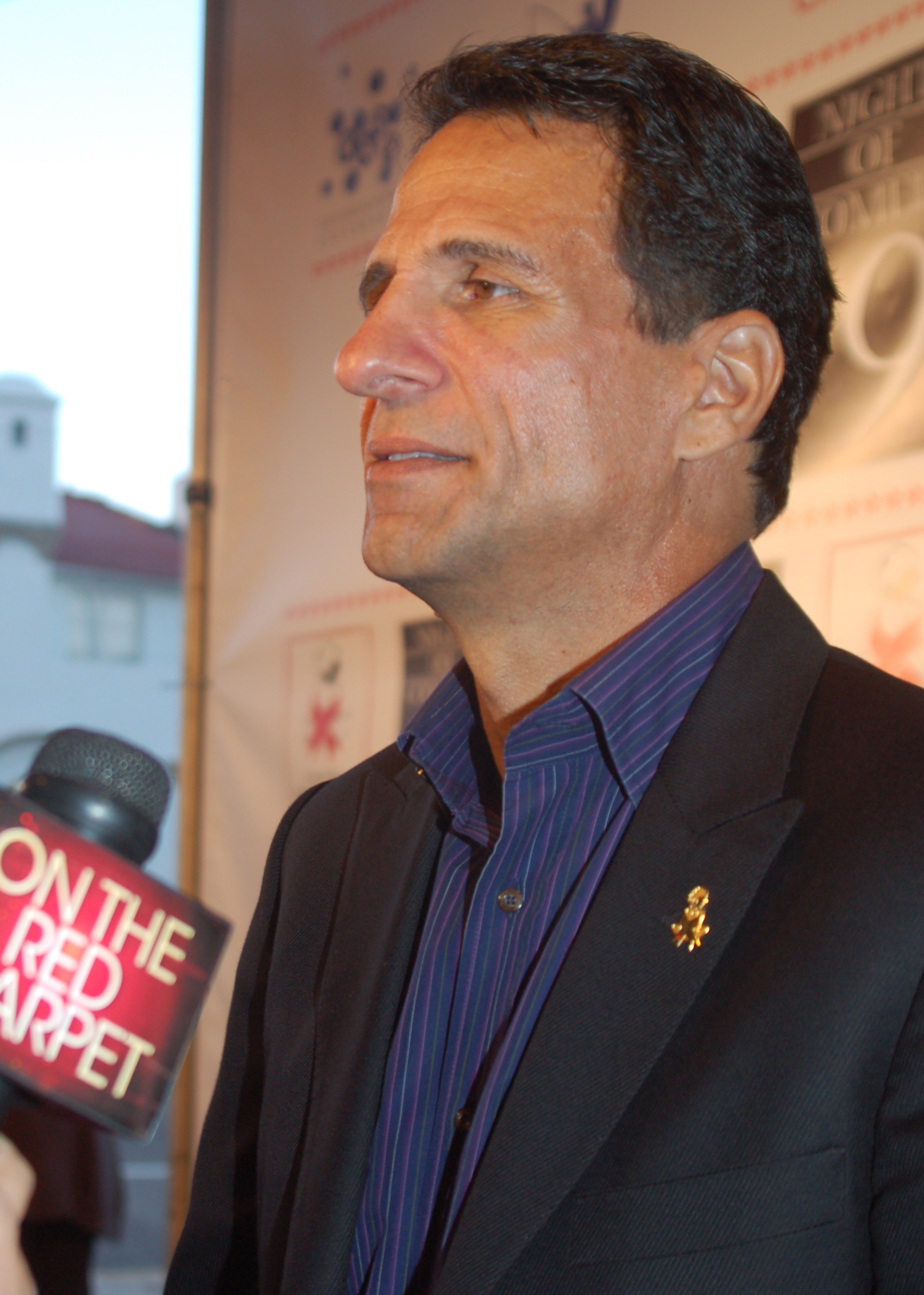
Cristina at an event for CAAF in April 2011

As a Mattel, Inc. executive, Joe Cristina's professional life has centered on children for more than 22 years. In 1993, Joe was faced with a dilemma—his health had been deteriorating due to HIV, he had lost two life partners to AIDS, and he was contemplating a quiet disability leave.

However, his boss, Jill Barad (then President of Mattel), proposed instead to Joe that he take a few weeks off to think about what he wanted to do with the rest of his life and trust that his friends and business colleagues would be there to support him. Cristina decided to publicly disclose his HIV+ status, and he was overwhelmed by the enormous outpouring of support he received. The response from everyone was the same: "What can I do to help?"

Cristina realized that he was being faced with a once in a lifetime opportunity to help make a difference in the world. The encouragement and support that he received from those at Mattel and throughout the children's industry inspired him. That inspiration, along with an improvement in his health due to the advent of "HIV cocktail therapy", convinced him to stay at Mattel and find a way to mobilize this network of diverse resources to make a positive difference in the lives of children affected by HIV/AIDS. Hence, the Children Affected by AIDS Foundation was born. In 2007, Cristina's health again began to falter due to the long-term effects of HIV coupled with medication side effects, and it became necessary for him to go on an extended medical leave from Mattel.

Joe Cristina served as the Board Chair for CAAF.

== Administration ==
CAAF had a staff of seven led by President Catherine Brown. The group has its headquarters in Los Angeles and maintains a satellite office in Chicago.
