= Caaf Water =

River in North Ayrshire, Scotland

Coordinates: 55°42′N 4°43′W

The Caaf Water in western Scotland (Keaff in 1747 also Caff) drains from the Caaf Reservoir above Dalry which is fed from Knockendon Reservoir. The Caaf Water's origins are springs below Green Hill and it is joined by the Bught Burn, the Reeves Burn, the Bradshaw Burn and the Stock Burn, passing the old Bradshaw (previously Broadshaw) shooting lodge before passing the old farms of Knockendon, Birkheadsteel, and Birkhead.

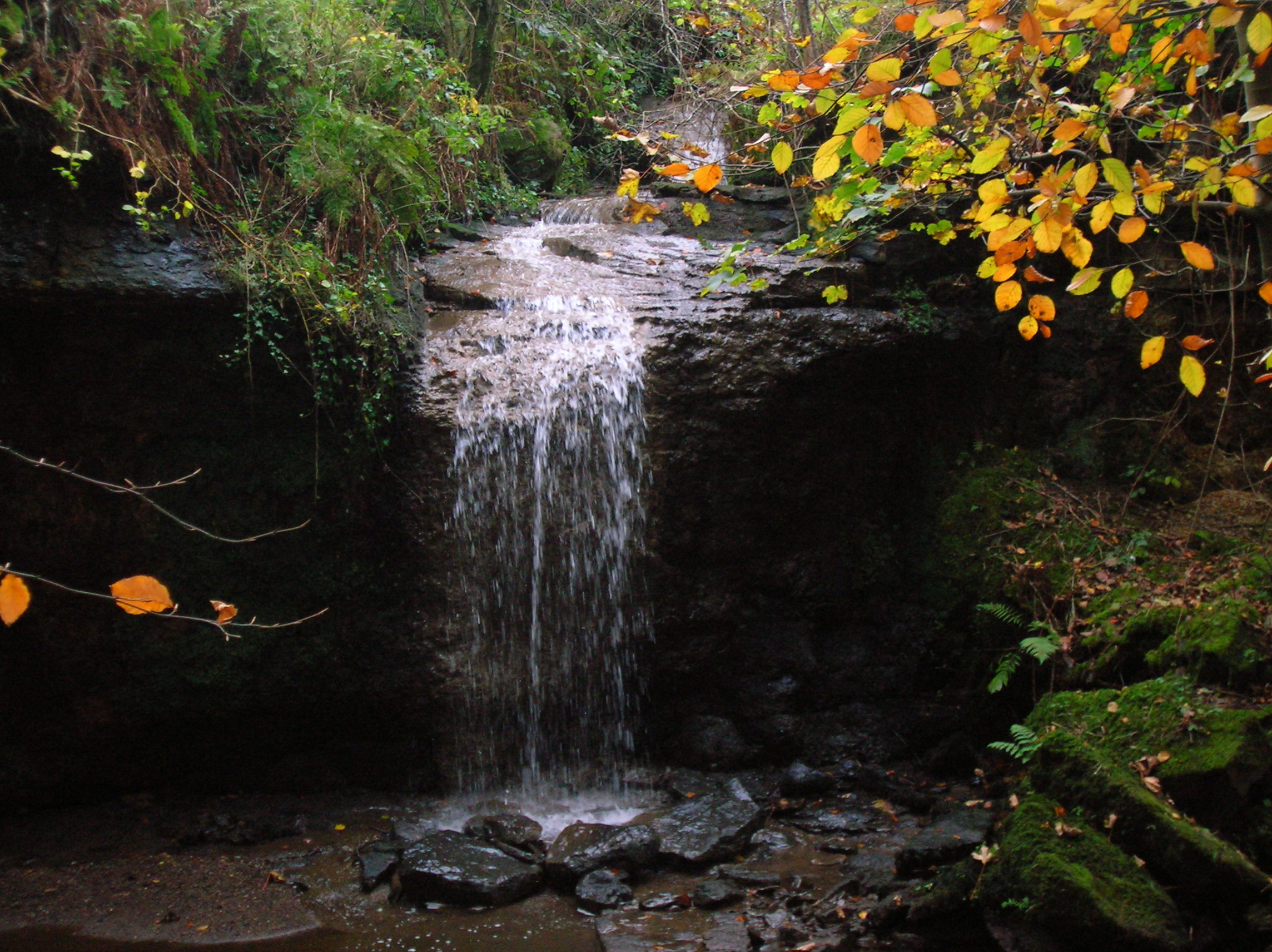
The Tower Burn entering the Caaf Water near Drumastle mill and Peden's Pulpit

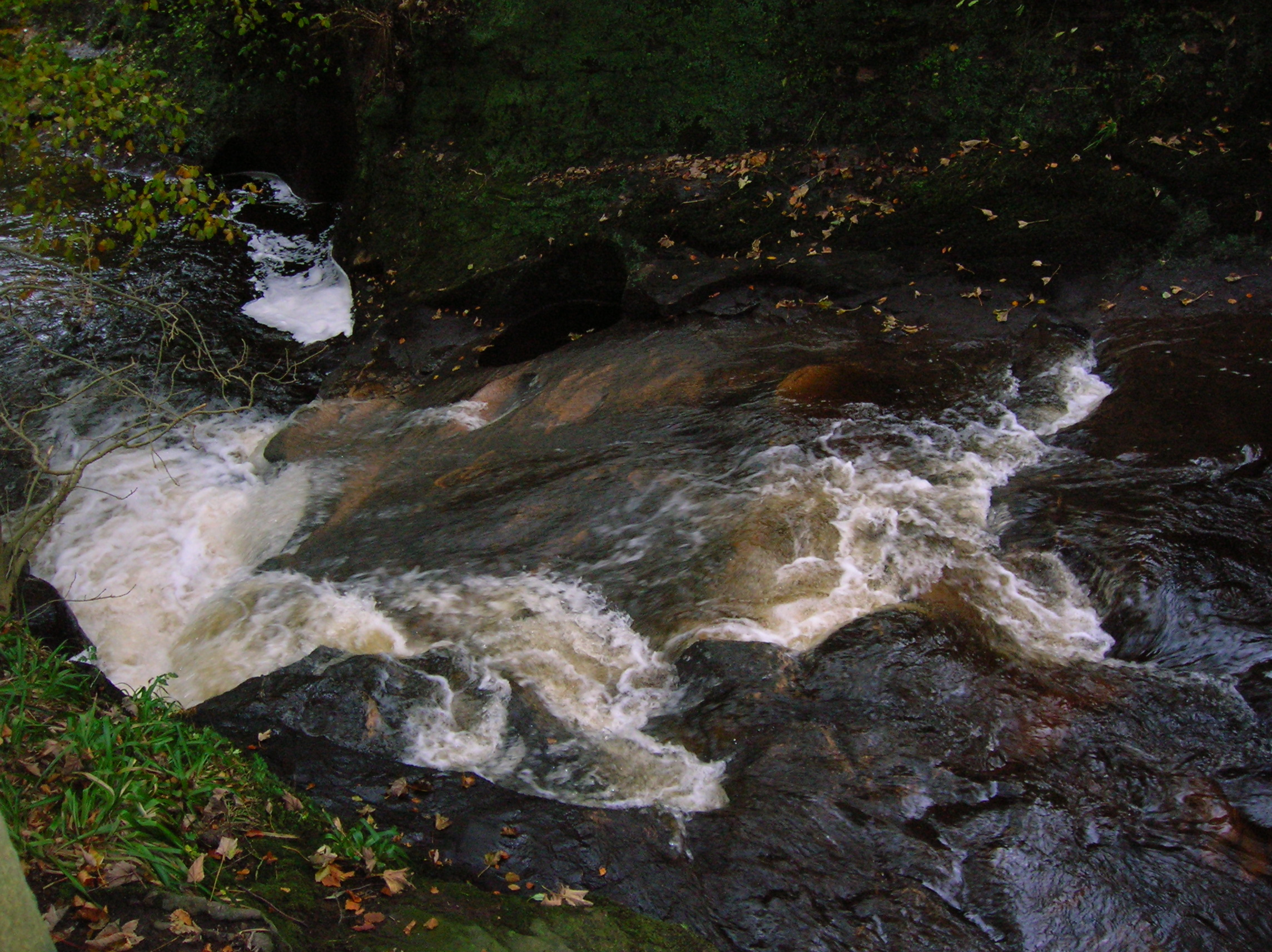
Peden's waterfall and rock-cut basin near Drumastle Mill

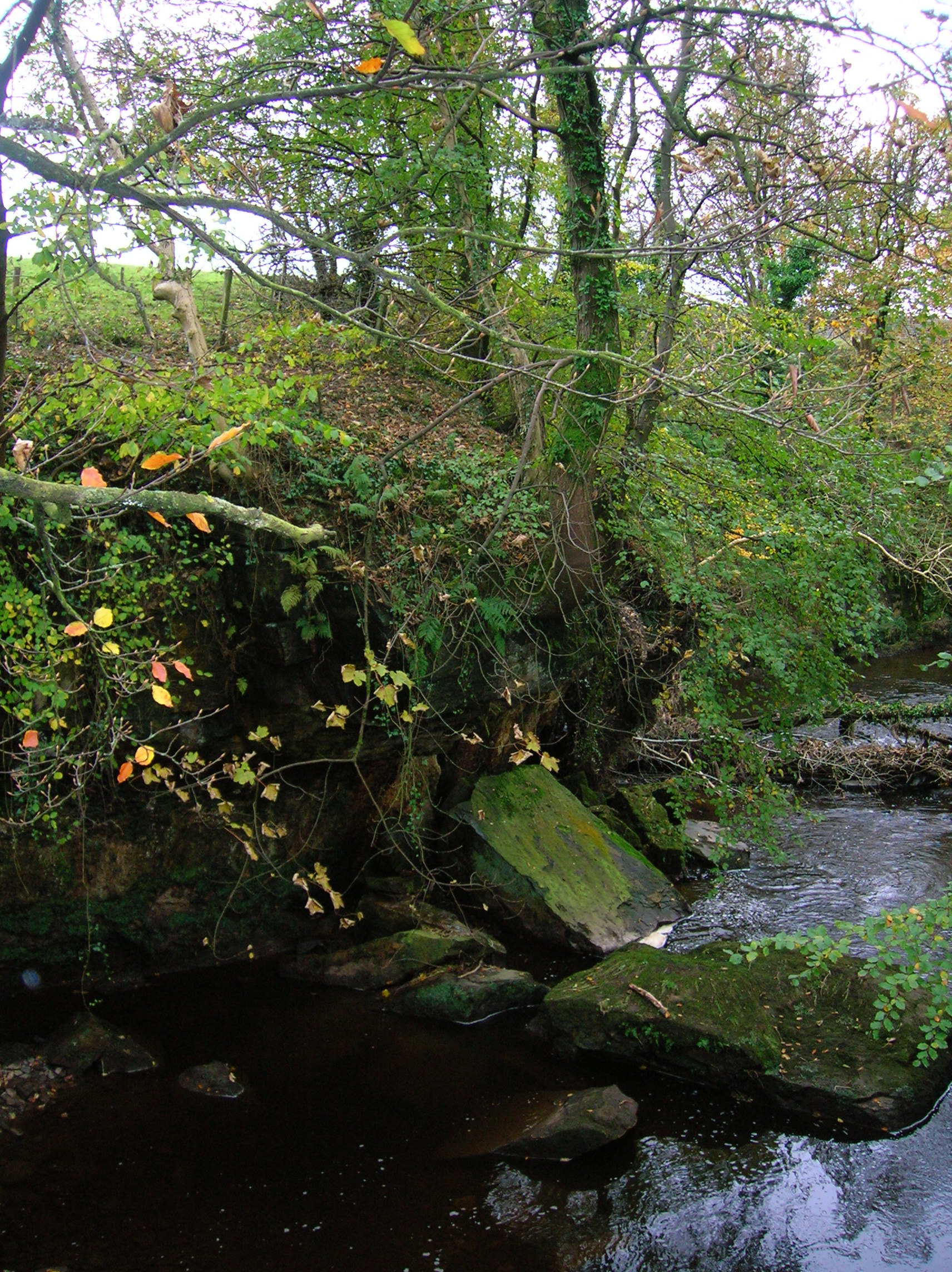
Peden's Pulpit at Pinnoch or Pinnioch (meaning Many Points) Point on the Caaf Water

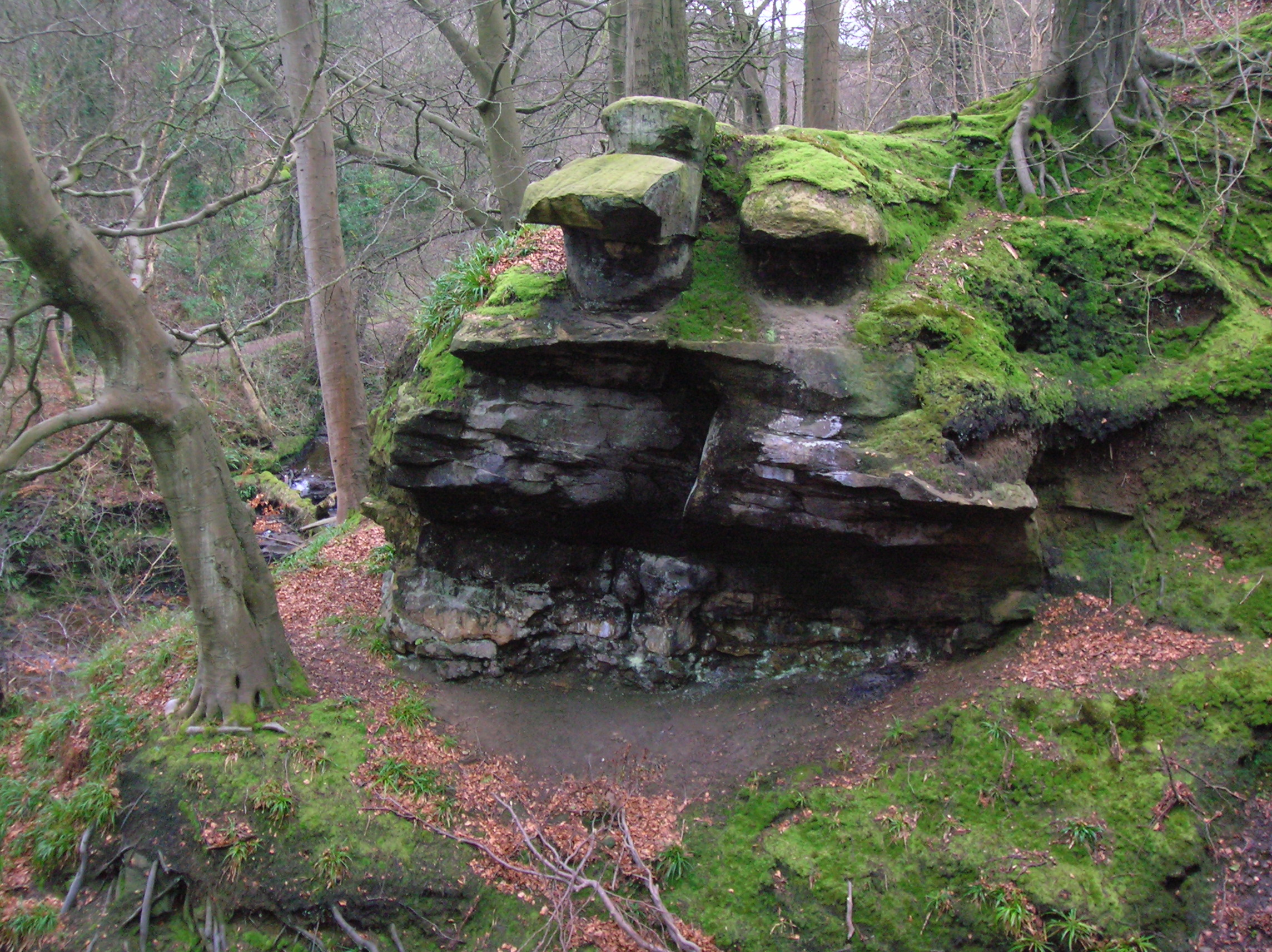
The other possible Peden's pulpit or point in the Lynn Glen

At Giffordland Bridge the old Giffordlandmill is passed before the Caaf joins with the Caddell Burn and Tower Burn near Drumastle and enters the Lynn Glen with its picturesque spouts or waterfalls and finally enters the River Garnock south of Dalry.

== Drumastle Mill ==
The mill was active in the late 19th century with two dams, one on the Caaf and the other on the Caddell Burn. The 1840–1888 OS map shows that a lade joined the two water courses with the mill. A ford and wooden footbridge were situated nearby and a dwelling marked as Muirfoot was located on the far bank of the Caaf. A lane linked the mill with Muirfoot and Linncraigs (now demolished) before running up to Linn House. William Roy's map of 1747 records Drumastle as 'Drumaskus.' An old Tower stood above the mill near the Tower Farm steading. Some OS maps corrupt 'Drumastle' to 'Drumcastle.'

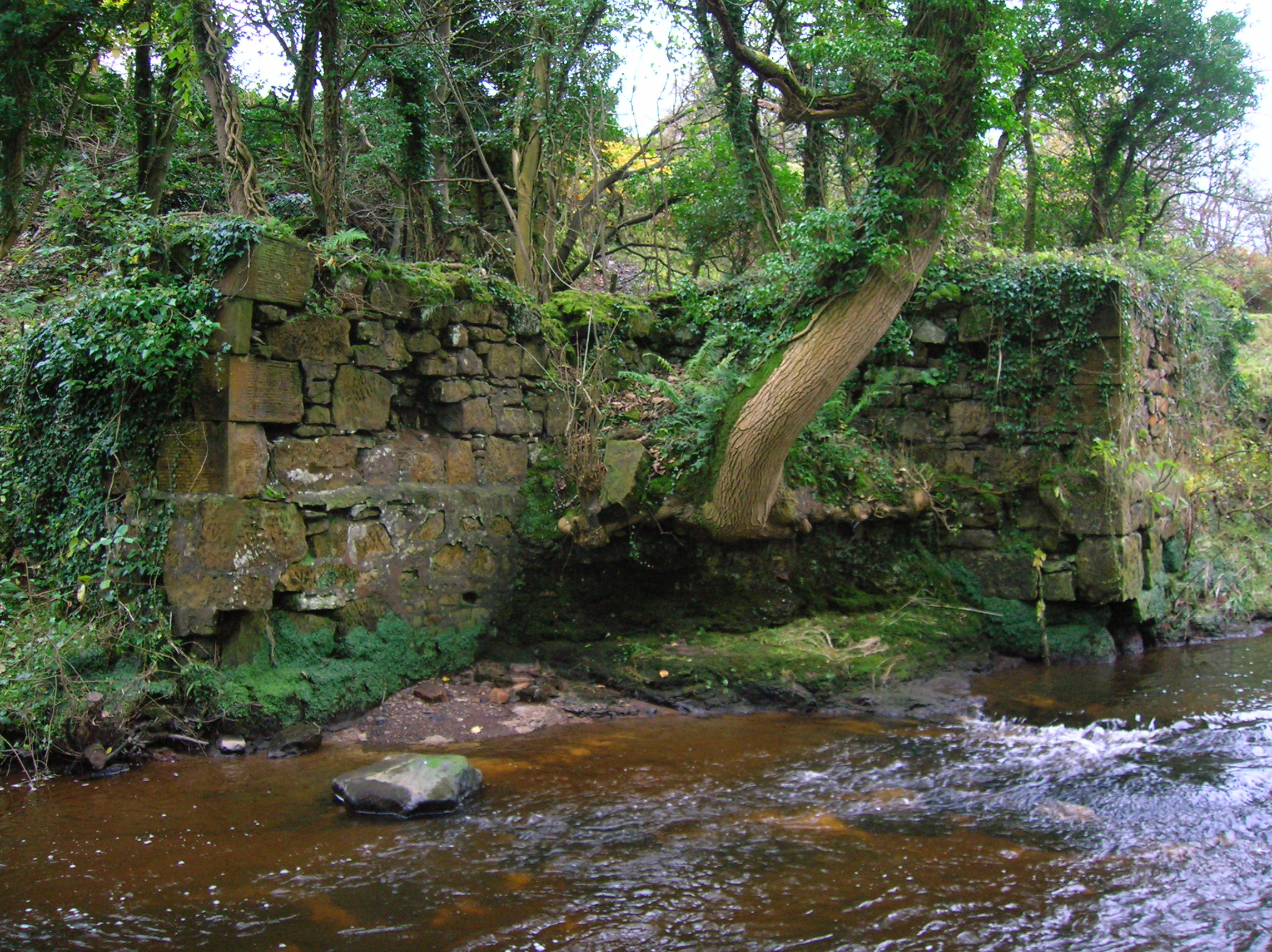
The Caaf Water and grain stores

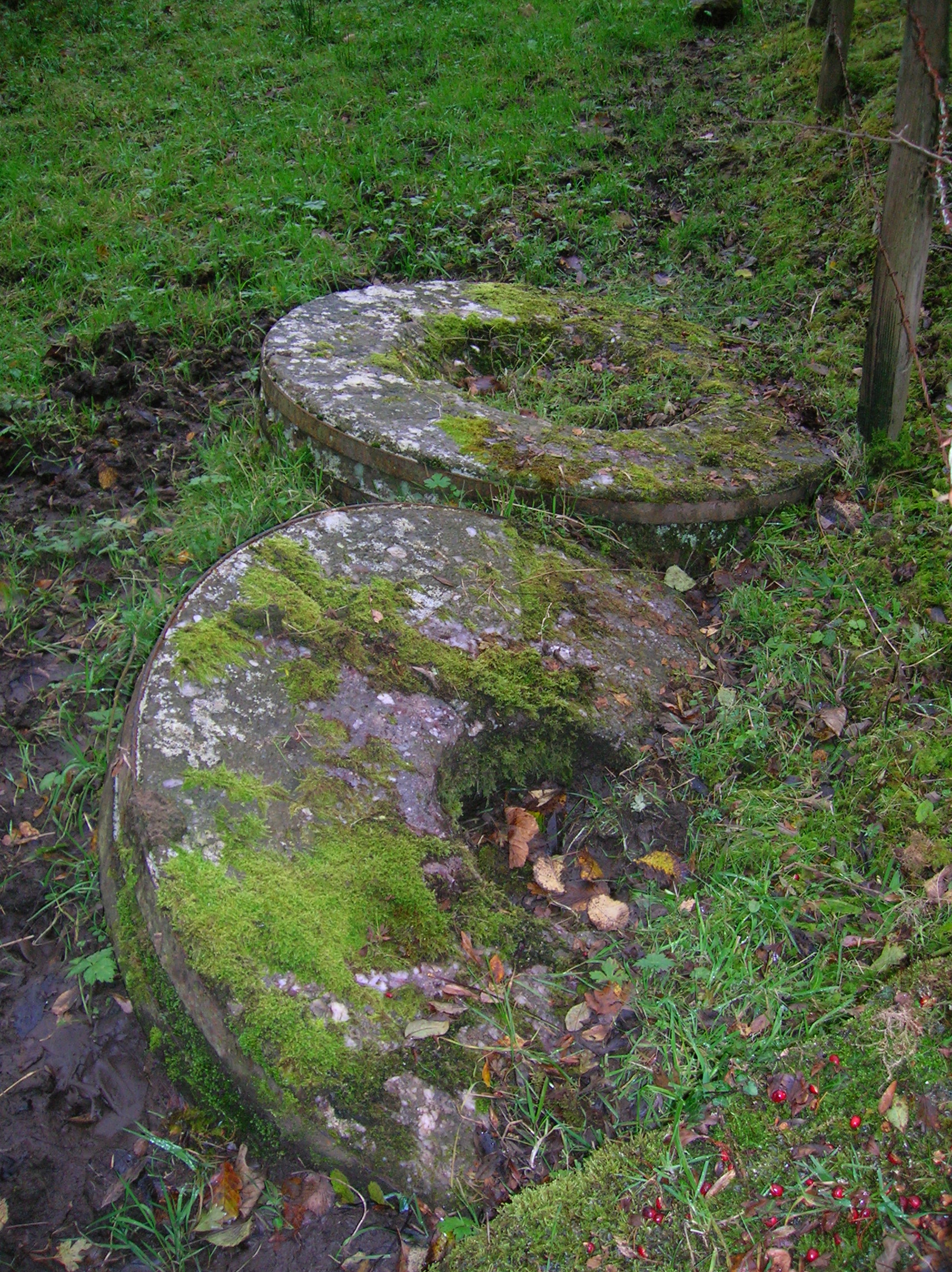
The composite grindstones

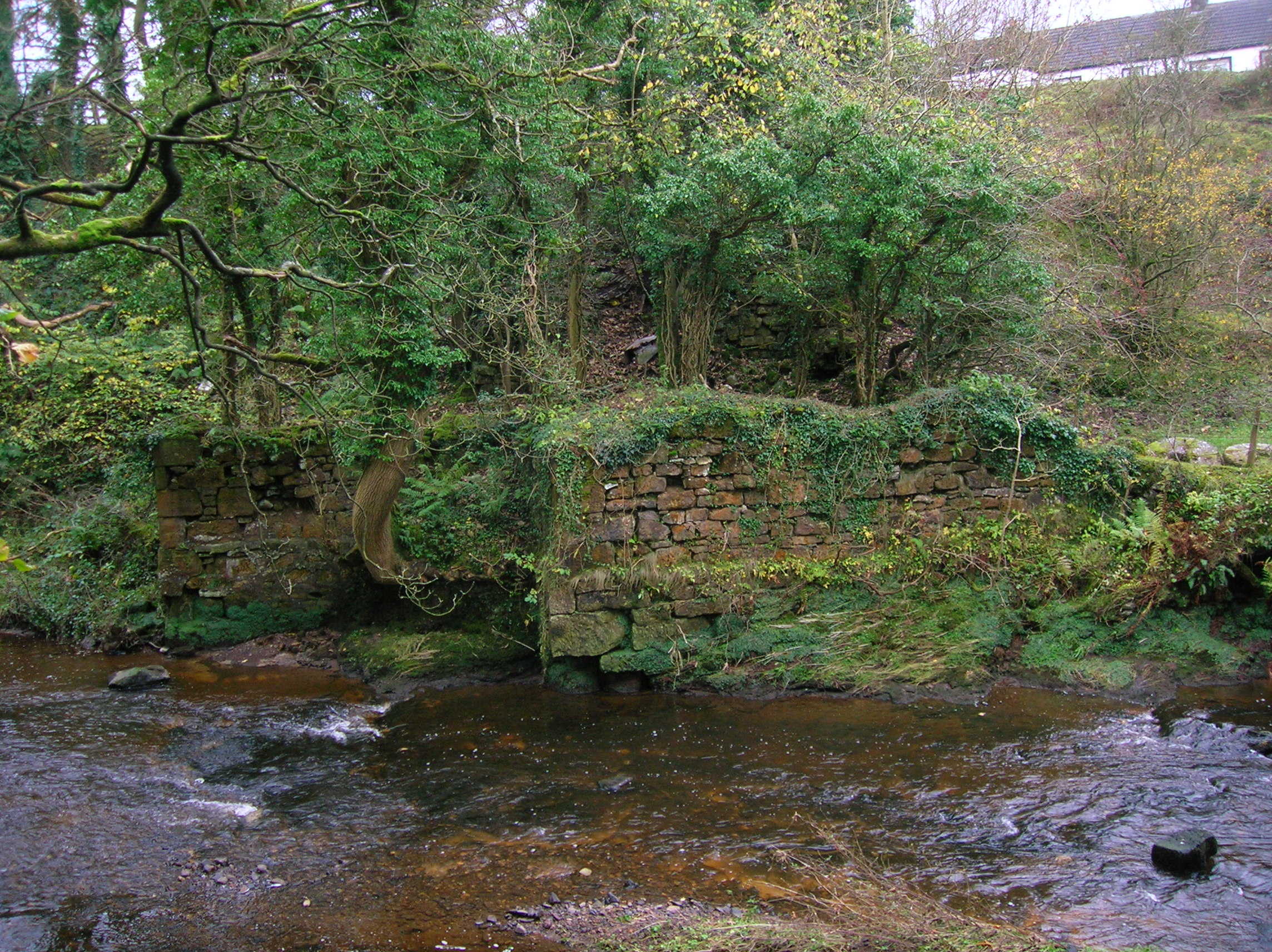
The grain stores, miller's house and grindstones

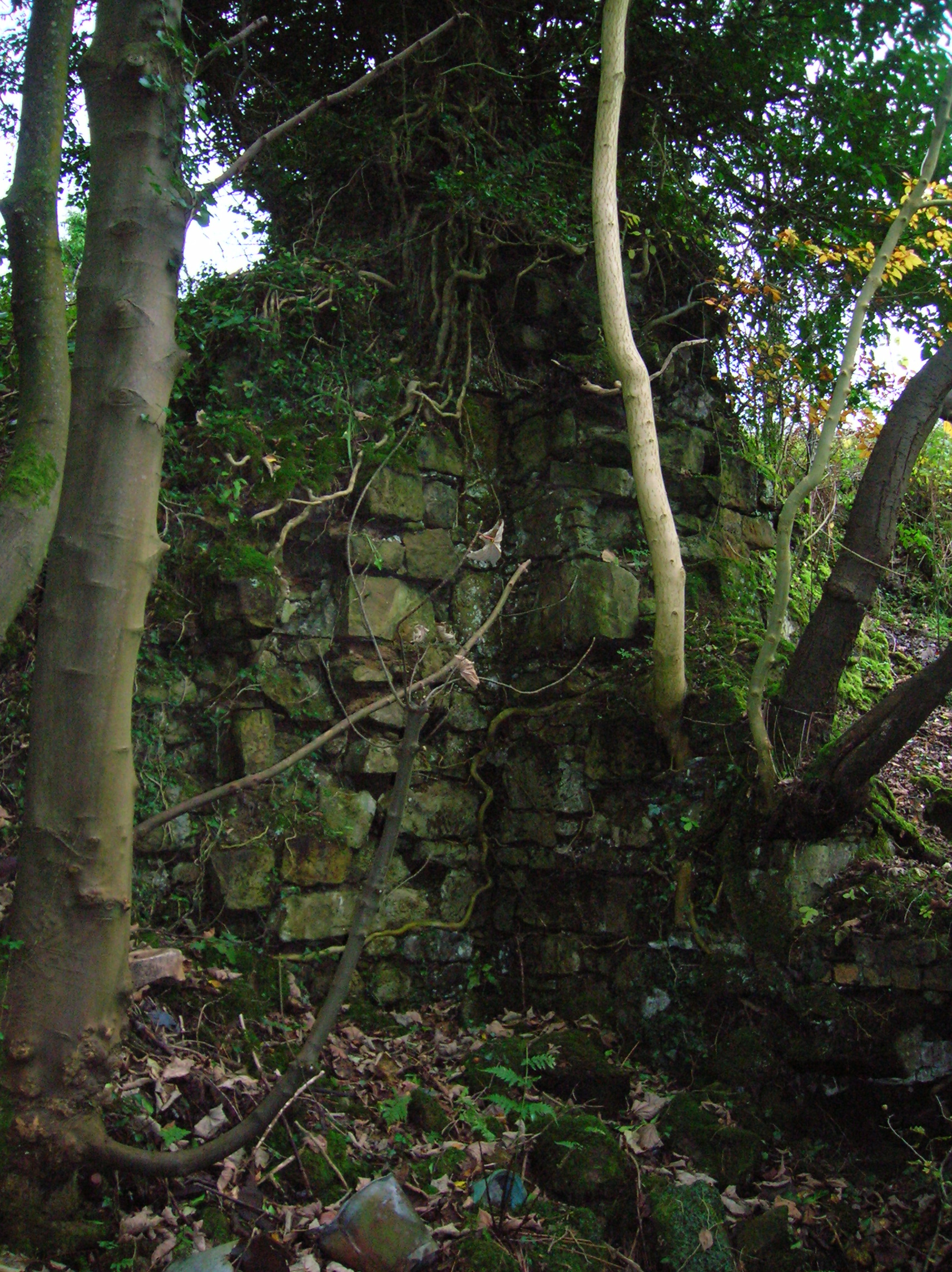
Ruins of the mill building

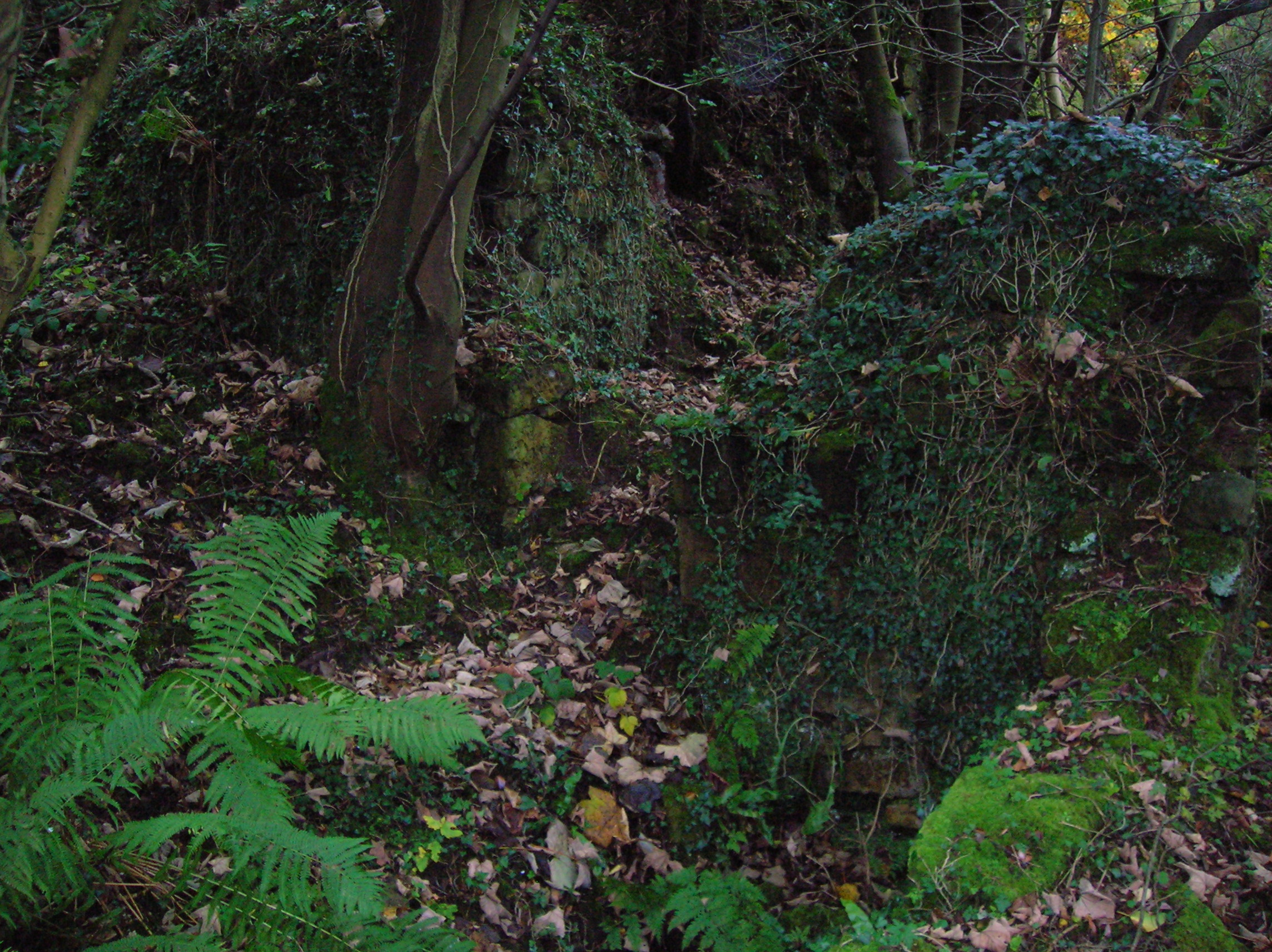
The wheelpit and lade

== Lynn Glen ==
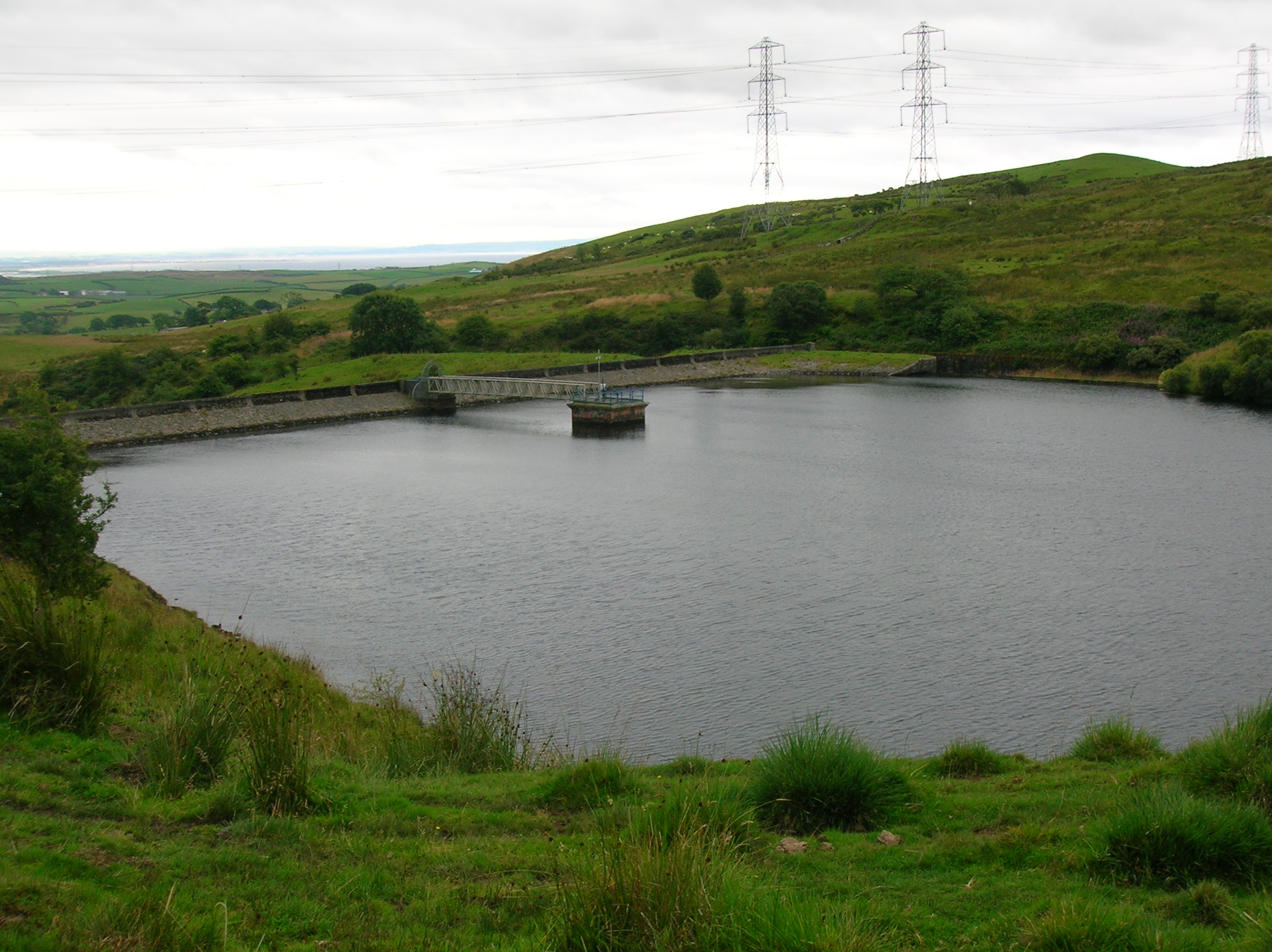
Caaf Water Reservoir and dam

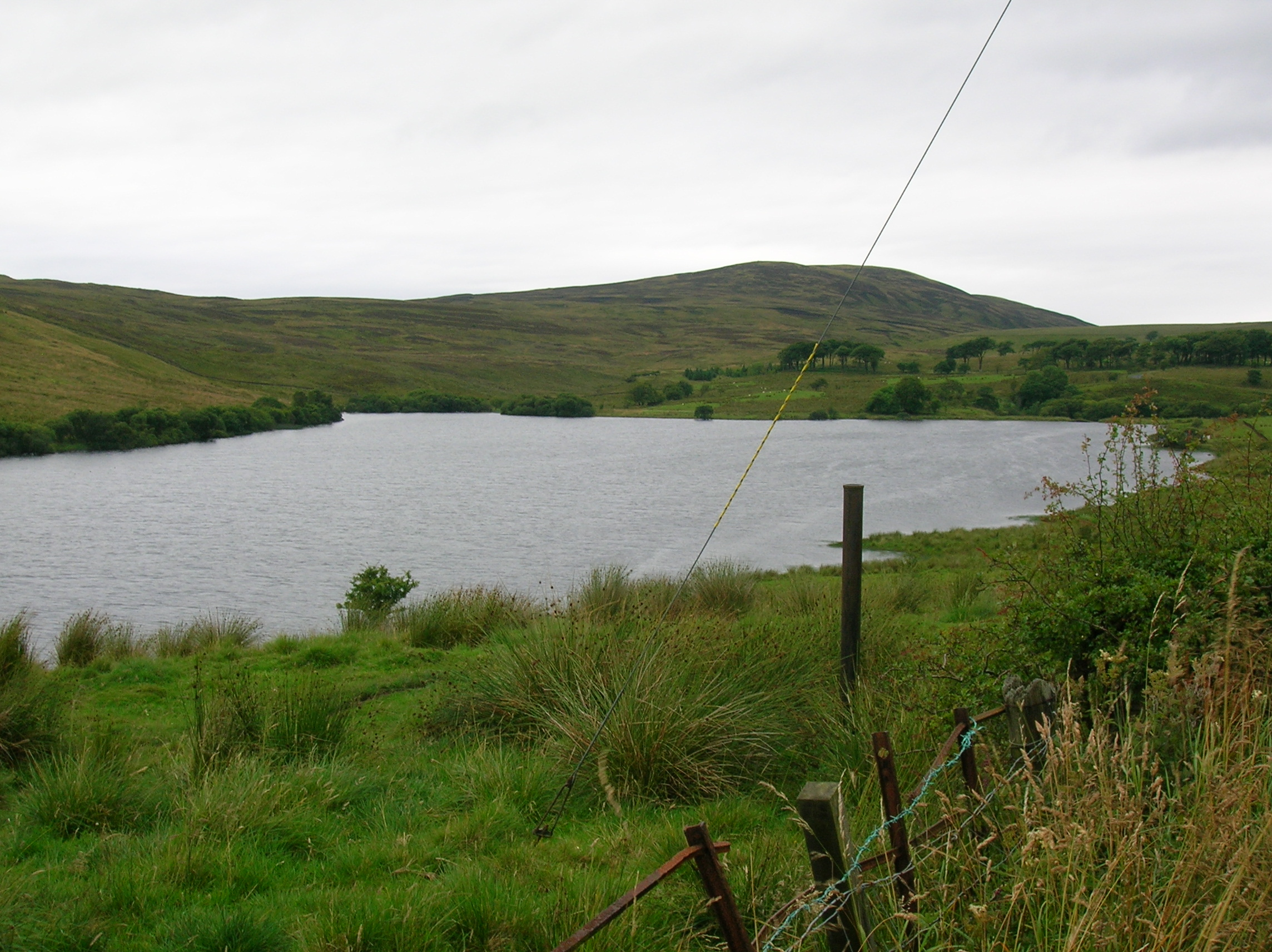
Caaf Water reservoir

Lynn Glen lies in the old Barony of Lynn, which was created from lands granted about 1204 by Hugh de Morville. It was first held by Walter de Lynne, who signed the Ragman Roll as Wautier de Lynne on 28 November 1296. On the same day, Walter de Lyn sat on a jury before the sheriff of Ayr, holding inquisition as to Lady Elena la Zuche's interests in the Ayrshire town of Irvine. Walter and the other jurors, as well as the sheriff, are mentioned at the close of the resulting document as having appended their seals thereto. English law, which would have prevailed in legal proceedings when the Ragman Rolls were signed, provided that "jurors were generally drawn from the ranks of free men who held property". Walter's position in the community is confirmed by his having a seal, although the Calendar notes - to the lament of Lynns everywhere: "Seals lost".

All that being said, Walter's family bore the name Lynne long before coming to Ayrshire; and they held all or some portion of the Ayrshire property for nearly half a millennium, from about 1204 until the mid 17th century. In 1532, John Lynn "for a sum of money to him paid, sold" to Thomas Boyd "forty-shilling land of the old extent of Lyn"., nevertheless retaining the mains or manor place, called at various times Burnside and Lynn Knoll, Over Lynn, and High Lynn. Eventually, however, even this was forsaken; and the ruins of the old manorial place in the 19th century was nothing more than a mound with some old cottage ruins near it.

The last Lynn of that Ilk died in Irvine, Ayrshire in 1670, and the last remnants of the family simply vanished, some say to Sweden. It has been claimed, though not proven, that Jenny Lind the "Swedish Nightingale" is descended from that family. The family itself has been described as "a beloved aristocracy that came, lingered a while, and vanished." Their property was parcelled out into lots among a number of heritors which in 1820 amounted to 16. The lairds of Lyne (sic) had a townhouse in Irvine as did many of the other lairds in Cunninghame.

In 1632, Thomas Boyd of Pitcon was also styled of Lin, owing to his father having purchased part of the old barony from the Lynns. By 1874, however, Lynn belonged to John Crichton. Paterson records that the property amounted to 240 acres (0.97 km^{2}) and the four merk Land of Lynn belonged to Lord Boyd in 1576, from whom the Pollocks acquired it in about 1770. In 1866 it had passed from them to the Crichtons as stated. The 19th century mansion of Linn no longer exists and all that remains are some woodland policies and an ornate gatepost.

The Dalry "witch", Bessie Dunlop, who was tragically burned at the stake in Edinburgh, was the spouse of one "Jack o’ Linn." As told in "Reports of Cases Decided in the Supreme Court of Scotland on Appeal from Scotland ...," Vol. XIII, by W. H. Dunbar, Esq., Advocate, Henry Beveridge, Esq., Advocate, and John Wadlaw, Esq., Advocate, Edinburgh (1841), the trial occurred in 1576, Jack's full name was Andrew Jack, and he and Bessie lived in Lynn. They were not members of the family of Lynn. By this time, in fact, the Lynn property was referred to as "the town and territory of Lyne in the bailliary of Cunningham and sheriffdom of Ayr," as found in a 1522 charter at the National Archives of Scotland and abstracted at the NAS website [Reference No. GD3/1/8/11/1].

During the "persecution times" of Charles II when the Covenanters were being hounded throughout south-west Scotland for their refusal to accept Episcopacy in the Kirk, Alexander Peden preached to the people from the natural pulpit of Pinnoch Point, now more often referred to as Peden’s Point.

=== Bourtreehill House ===
The Lands of Bourtreehill were at one time held by the Linn family.

=== Legends of the glen ===
==== The Wraith of Lord Lyne ====
The story is told of Lady Lyne, mother of the young Lord Lyne, many years ago witnessing the wraith of her son, a warning of his impending death. The Lyne family had a tradition of such premonitions and on this occasions she was in the glen when all of a sudden she espied a company of huntsmen on horseback; her son in the lead with the dogs, who were in full cry after a stag. As she watched this vivid scene they vanished like a dream. She hurried back to urgently find and warn her son.

Lord Lyne listened and accepted his fate, for what could he do if it was indeed God's will. The next day he was up and about, bright and early, but never to return. His anxious mother had sent out all the servants to search the glen for him, eventually finding her son in a pool at the foot of Lynn Spout, seemingly having fallen and then drowned. It has been said that Lady Lyne believed to her dying day that her son had encountered death himself that morning in Lynn Glen and that her vision was that of her son hard on the heals of a ghostly stag and the wild dogs of hell.

The complete folk tale as written down by William Robertson in his 1899 "Historical Tales and Legends of Ayrshire" is found verbatim at.

==== Views of the Lynn spout and Glen ====
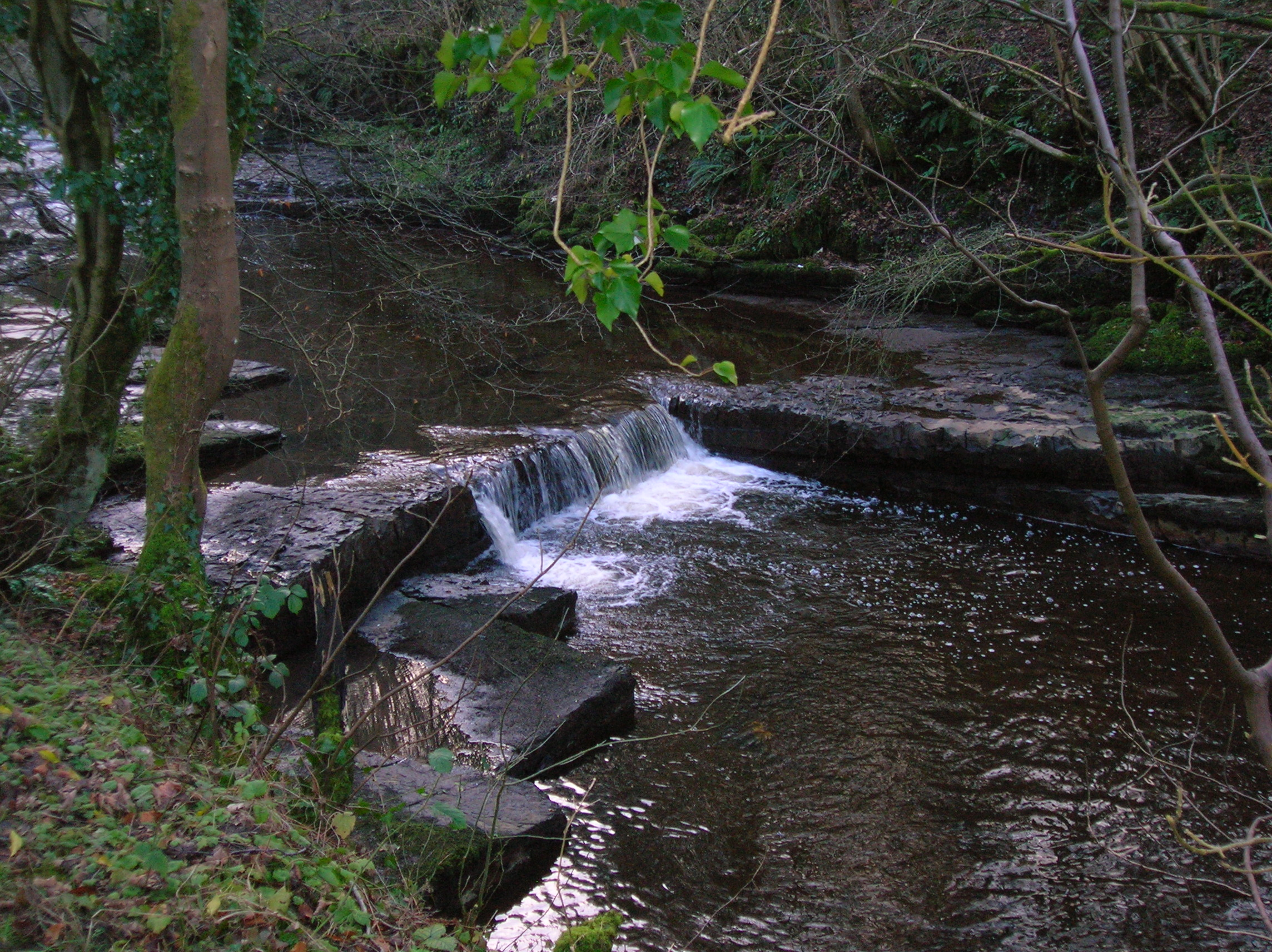
A small waterfall on the Caaf Water above the Lynn Spout

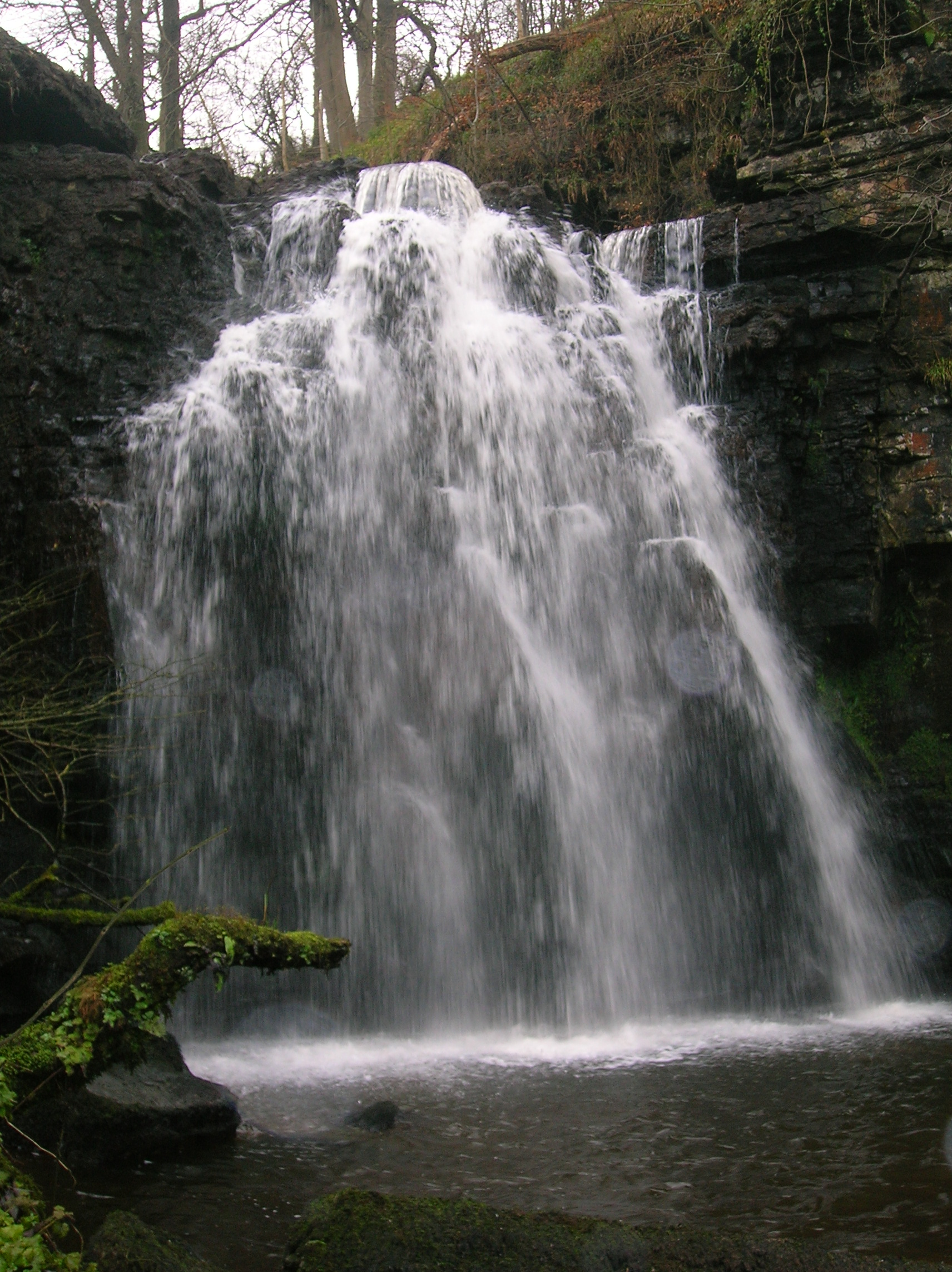
Lynn Spout on the Caaf Water

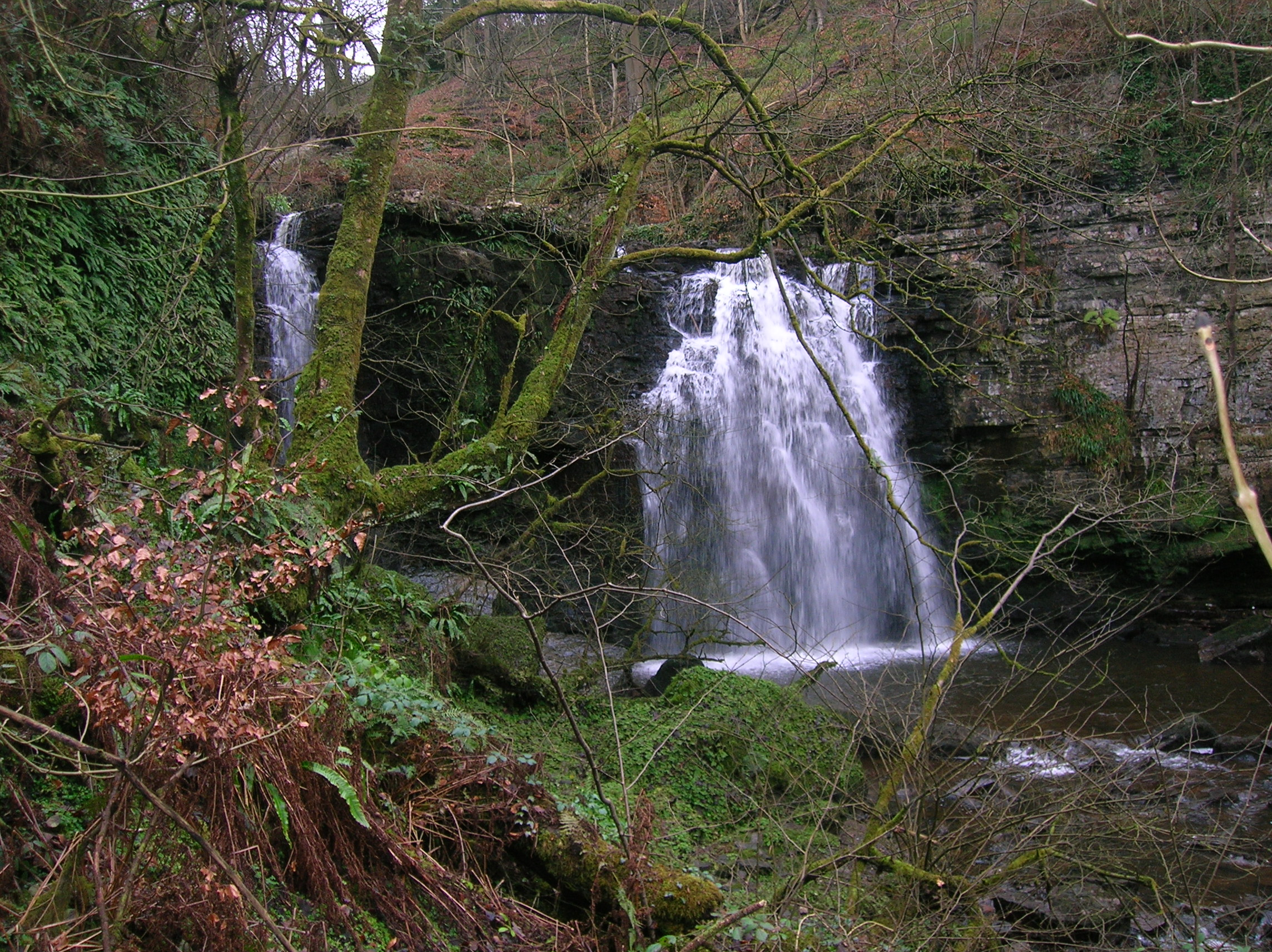
Lynn Spout on the Caaf Water; illustrating the thick limestone deposits in this area

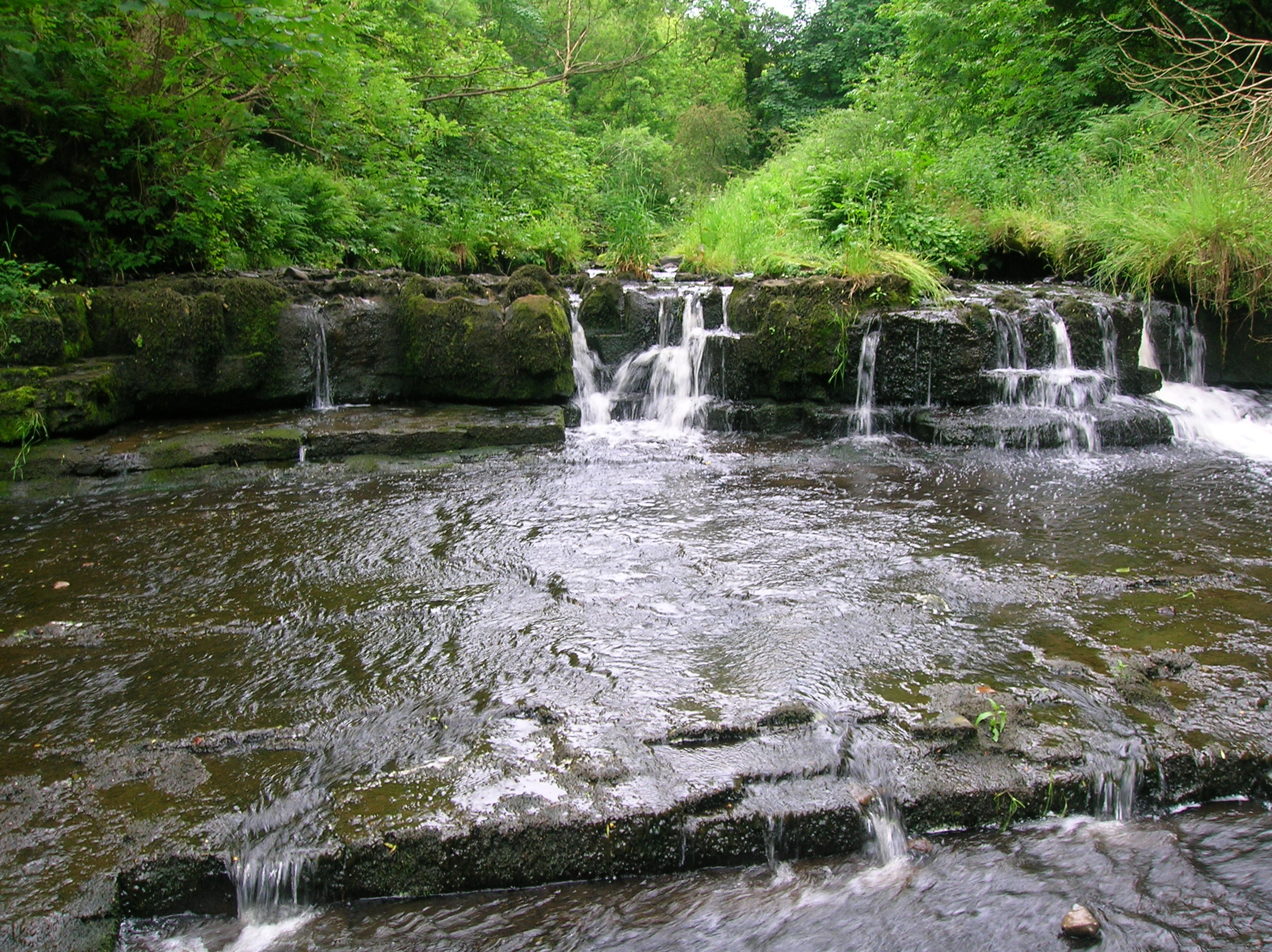
The Caaf Water running over limestone. A good site for rock-cut basins.

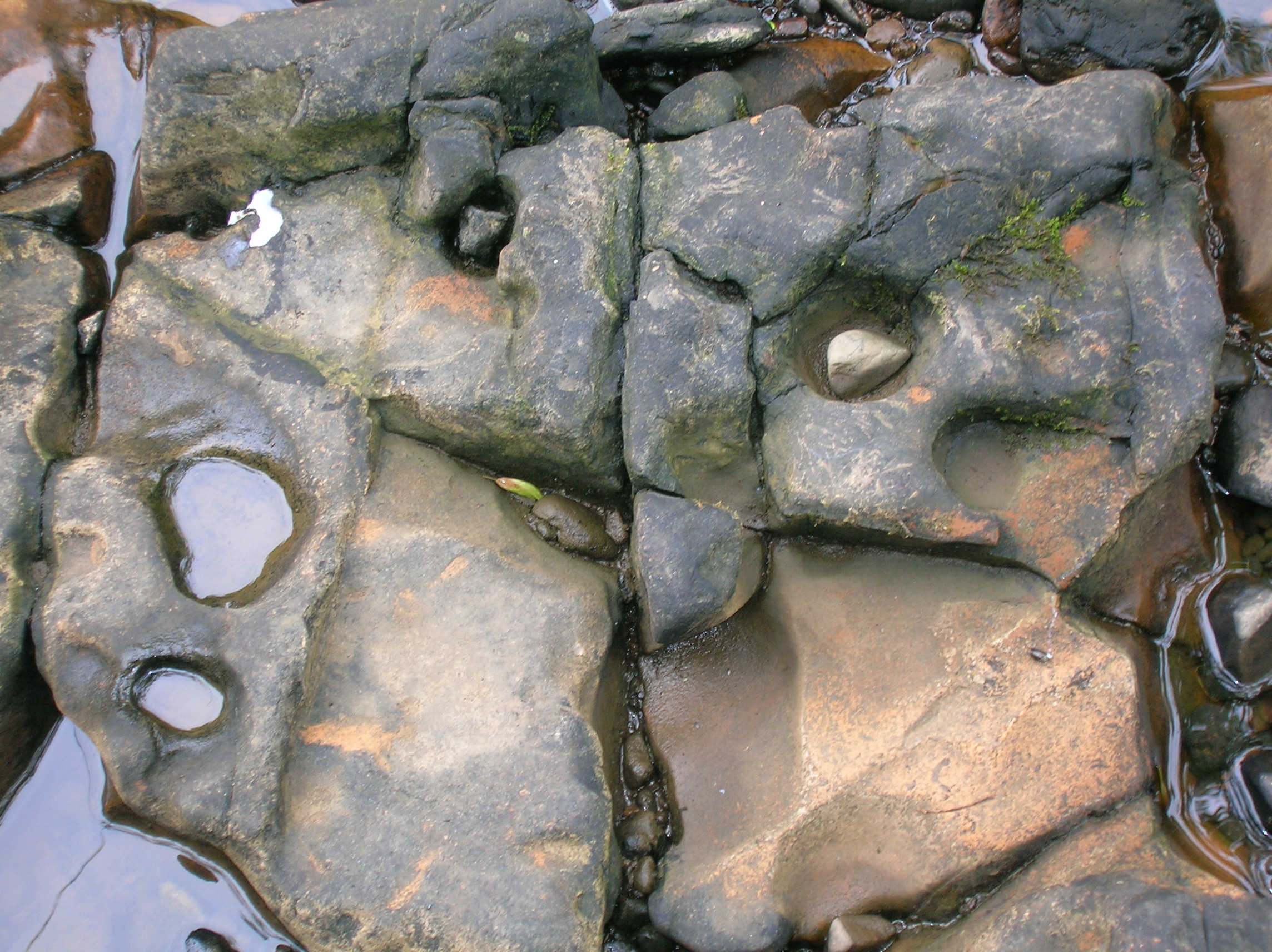
Rock-cut basins with the eroding pebble in situ. Very low water levels.

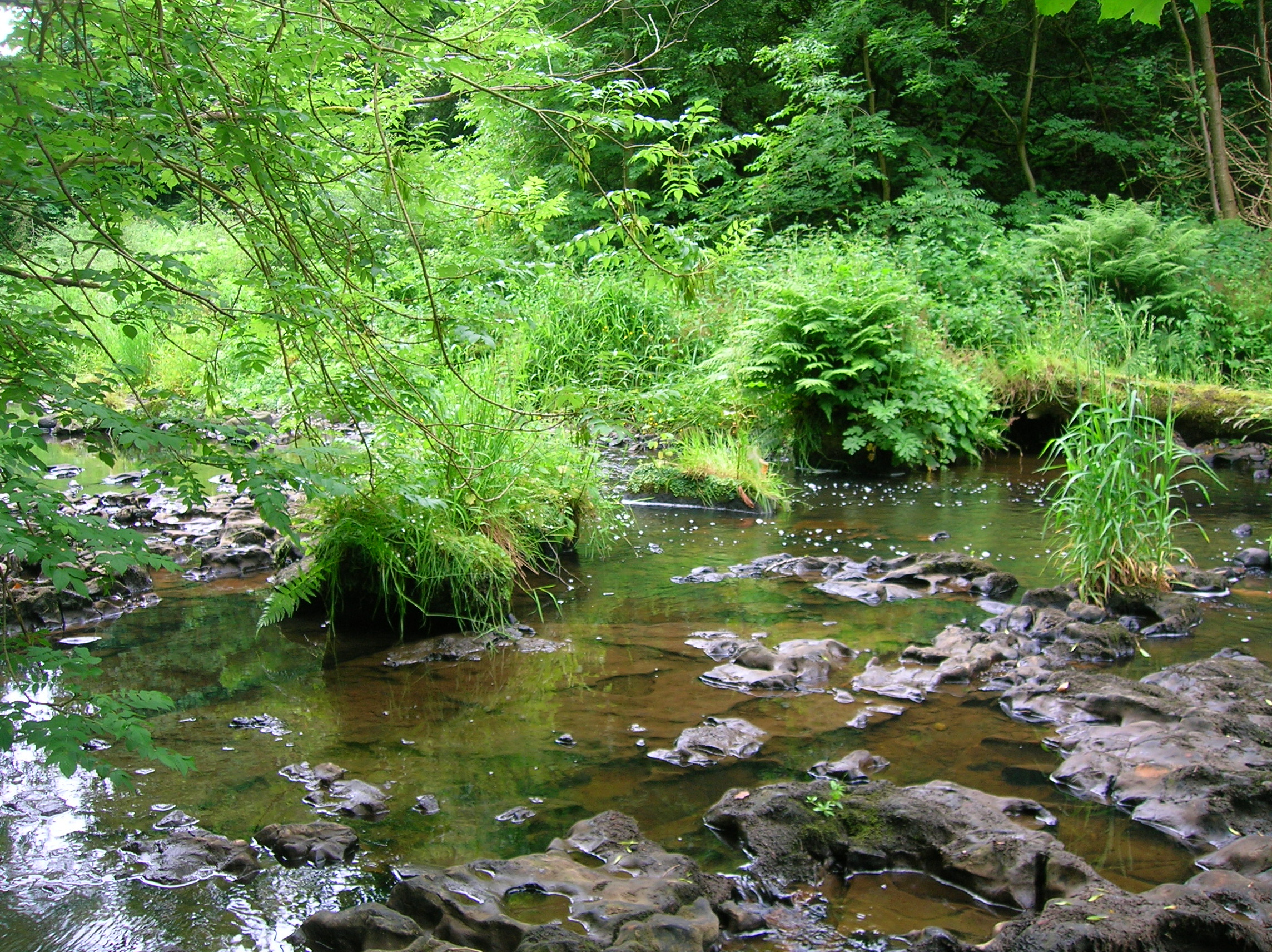
The remains of an old footbridge near the entrance to the old lade

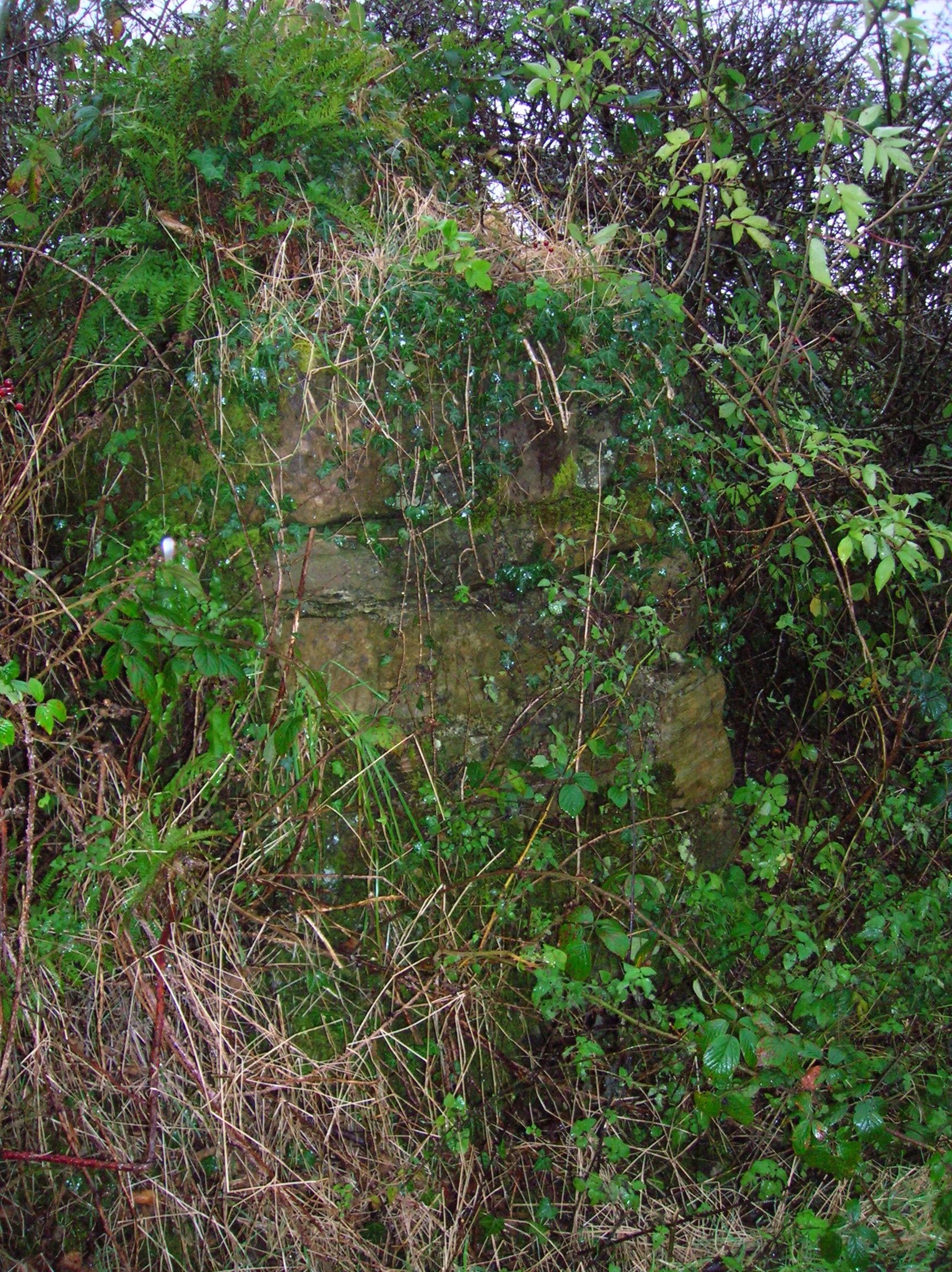
One of a pair of old gateposts on the lane from Drumastle Mill and Linncraigs to the old Lynn House

== The natural history ==
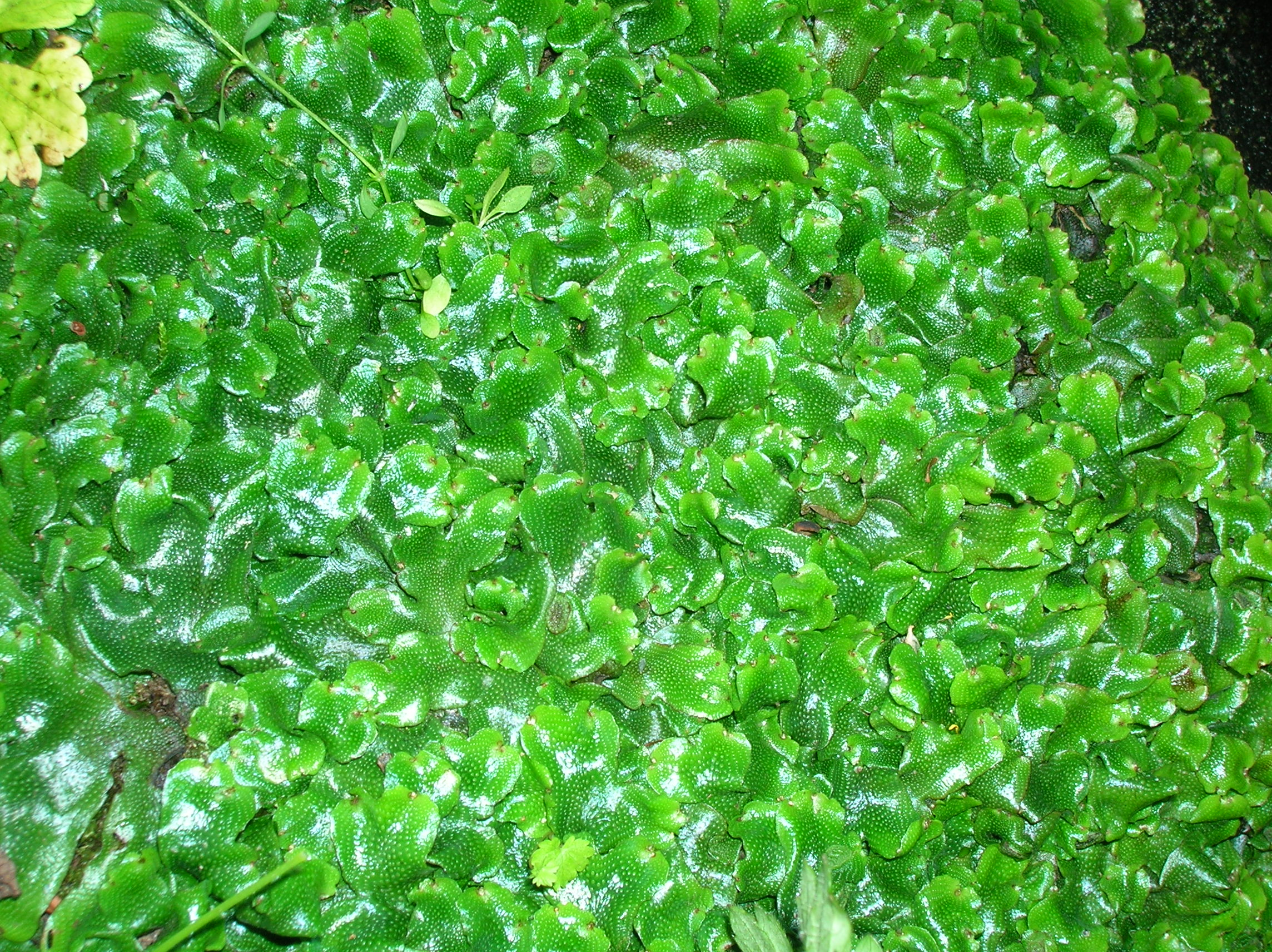
The Liverwort Conocephalum conicum on a rock in the Caaf Water

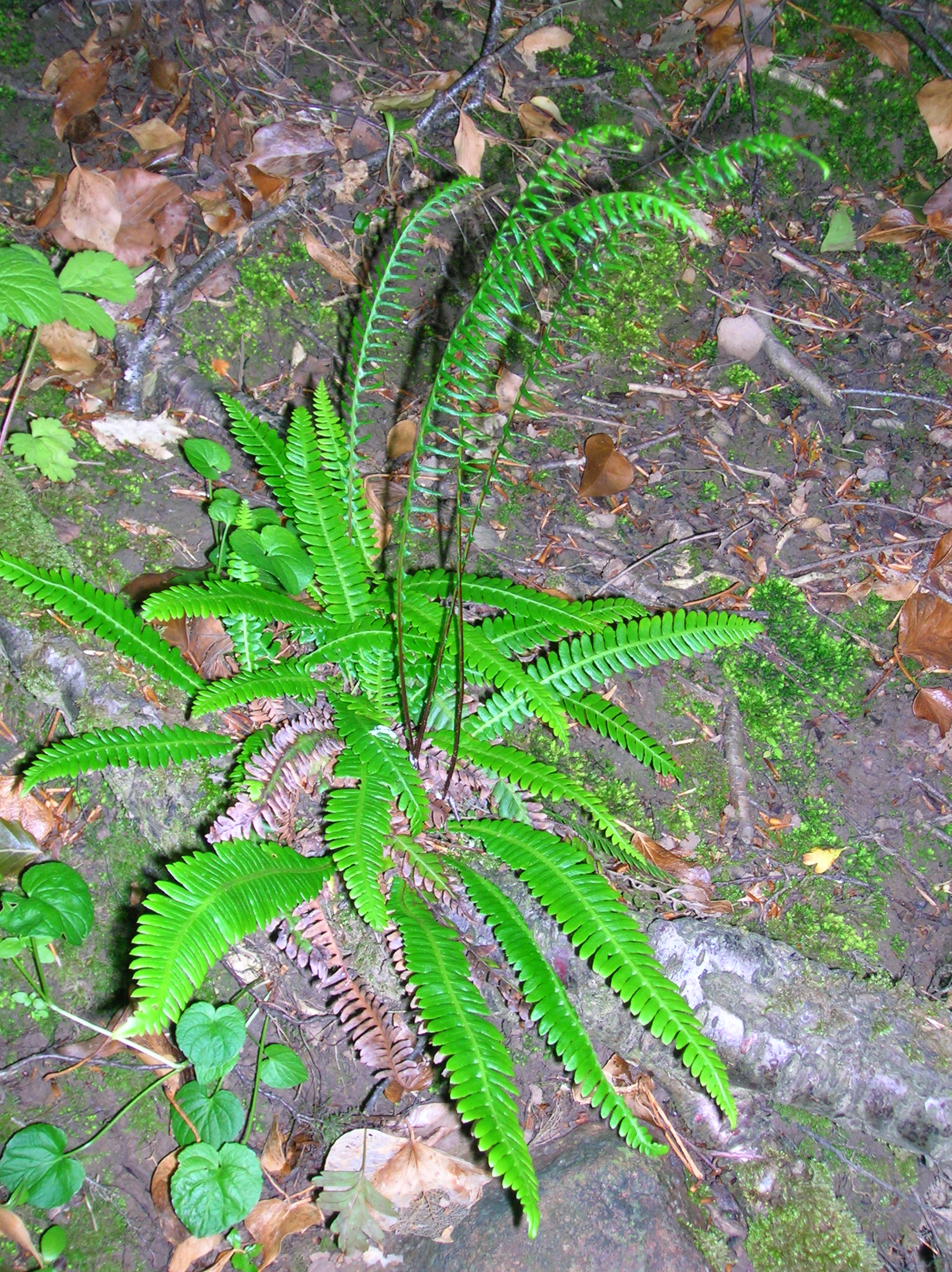
Hard Fern (Blechnum spicant) in the Linn Glen. Note the vertical fertile fronds typical of this species.

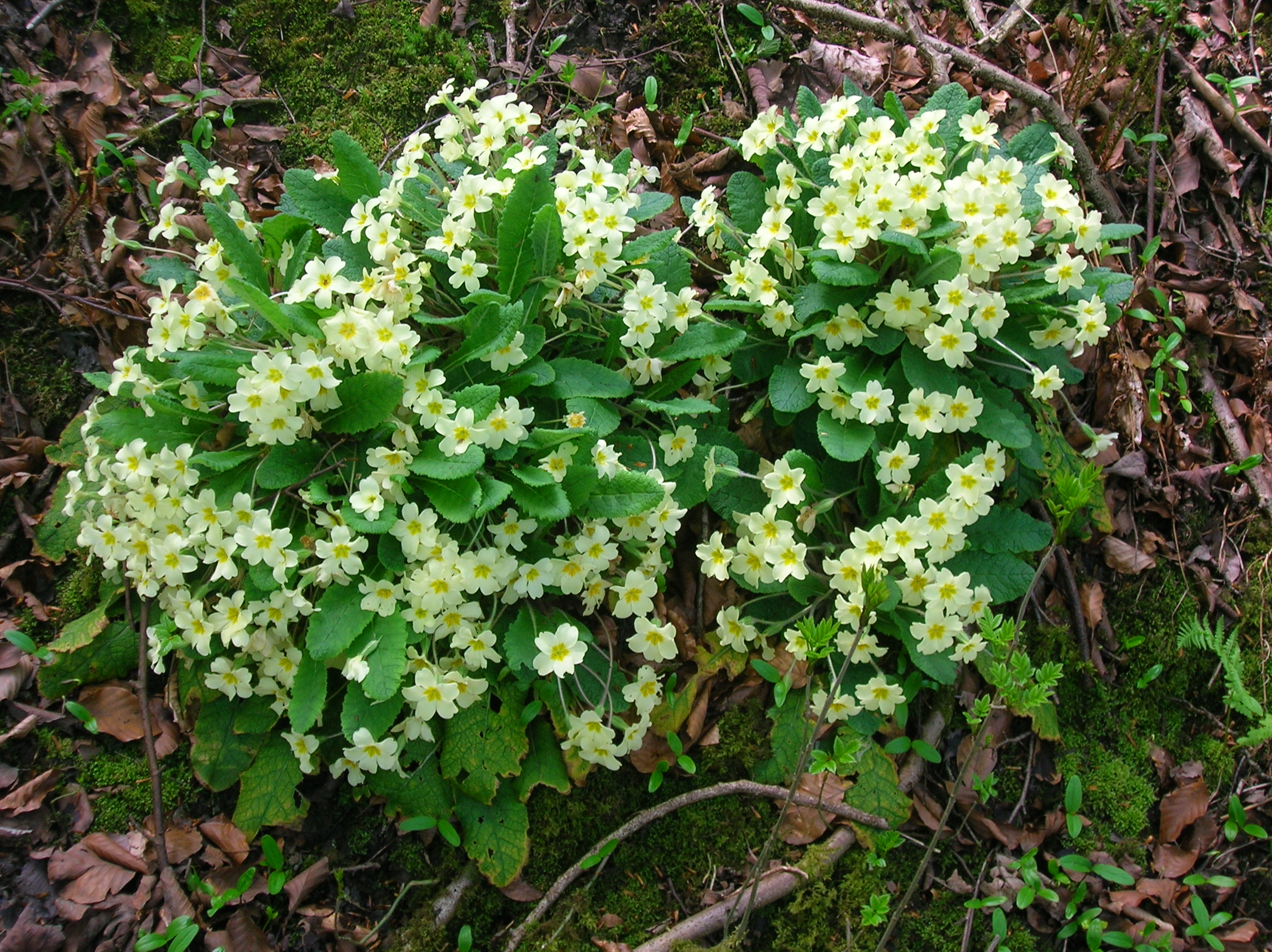
Primroses in the Glen

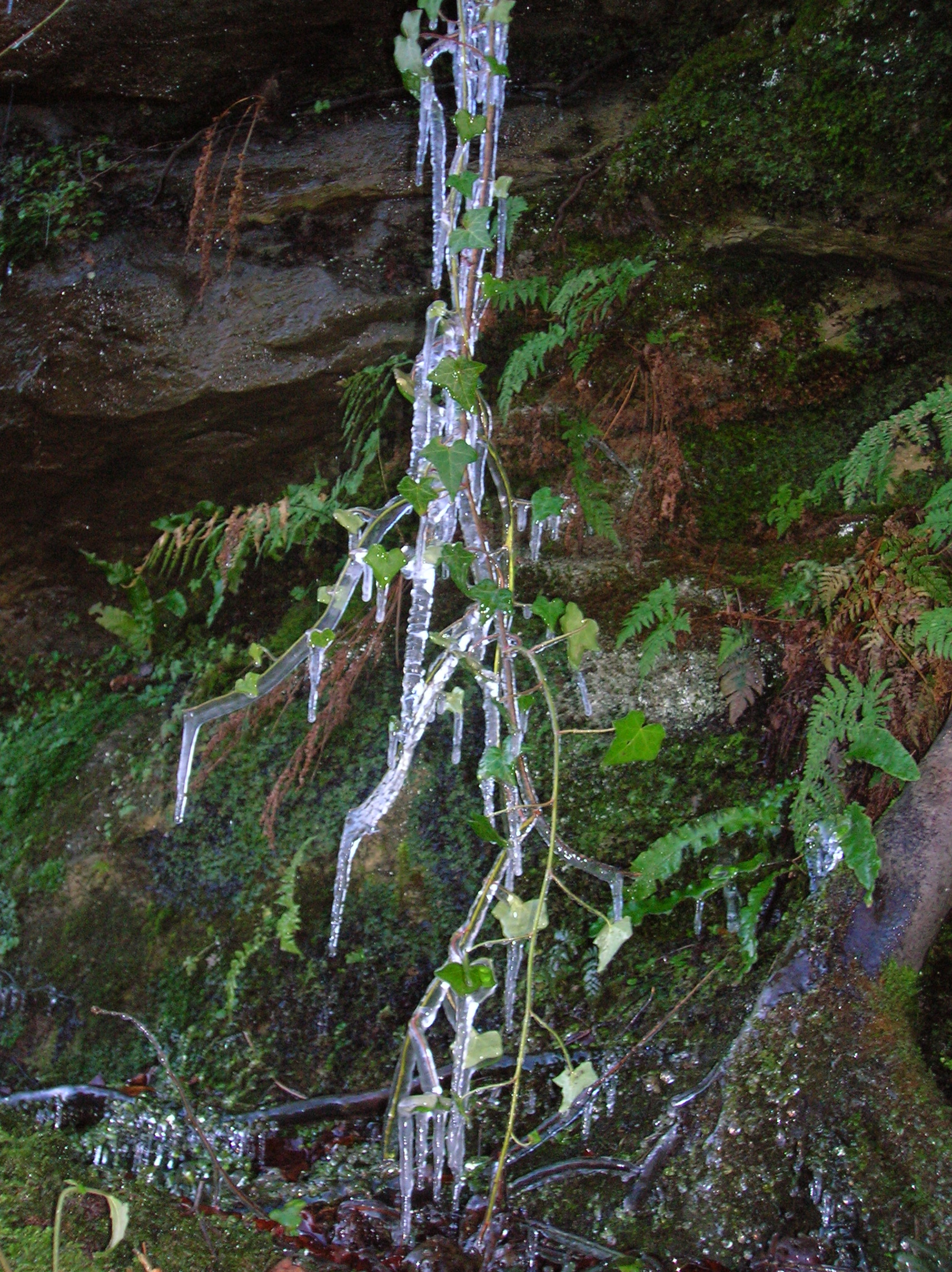
Ivy covered with a thick layer of ice

=== The Laird of Lynn's lesson from the grave to his son ===
The ancient ballad from which the following story was derived has often been associated with the Linns or Lynns in Ayrshire but more likely was a tale of the Lynes who were Lords of Lyne in Peebles-shire. The ballad was collected and published by Thomas Percy in London in 1765 in his "Reliques of Ancient English Poetry: Consisting of Old Heroic Ballads, Songs, and Other Pieces of Our Earlier Poets" (Vol. II, pp. 309–18). There, Percy described the ballad as being "originally composed beyond the Tweed," understood to mean in the Scottish Borders. The association with Ayrshire likely came about because Timothy Pont, about 1600, assumed that the ballad must have been a tale of the Ayrshire family since he wrongly believed that "no other race of the same name and designation [was] ever known to have existed in the country ..." Pont admits, however, that local [Ayrshire] tradition was silent on the subject. Pont's account was written about 1600 and was published by The Maitland Club in 1820 as the "Topographical Account of the District of Cunningham, Ayrshire. Compiled About the Year 1600 by Mr. Timothy Pont. With Notes and an Appendix." What Pont apparently did not know was that a David de Lyne lived in Peeble-shire in 1270 and was described in a volume of "The Scots Peerage" (Vol. IX, p. 199) as being the "quondam Domini [late Lord] of Locherworth." Nearly a century earlier, David de Lyne, son of Robert de Lyne, and David's uncle Walter de Lyne held rights to the Chapel of Lyne in Peebles-shire, as reported in "The Book of Stobo Church. Being the First Volume of a Series of 'Books of the Church'," p. 6, Dr. Gunn, Peebles (1907). The gist of the ballad is as follows ...

The Laird of Lynn despaired of his naive and foolish son, generous to a fault and giving trust were none was deserved. On his death bed he called for his son and one last time warned him of the perils that a rich man faced in this world. With his last breath he told his son that if he lost everything he should go to a ruinous old cottage which would be his last hope for shelter. As the months went by the young laird entertained his many new friends and indeed his gamekeepers son, known as Jock O' the Scales, was especially helpful and supportive. Shortly the young Lord found that all his money was spent and eagerly accepted an offer from Jock who purchased the barony and promptly threw the laird out his home and exiled him from his lands. Full of self-importance, upon his successful betrayal, Jock offered to sell the whole property back for a fraction of its value, knowing that such a young fool would never be capable of gaining even such a relatively small sum.

The Laird of Lynn remembered his father's death bed advice and the small key he had been given, so in his despair sought out his last resort, the dilapidated cottage in the woods at Coal-heuch-glen. After much searching he found and entered the building, only to be greeted by the sight of a hangman's noose dangling from the ceiling. Convinced of his father's apparent message from the dead he put the rope around his neck, only to find himself falling to the floor and being rained upon by plaster. He saw a letter in his father's hand and this directed him to a corner of the cottage where behind two loose stones he found a chest full of silver and gold. A new wisdom, from an almost fatal lesson, guided the Laird of Linn for the rest of his days, living quietly, with many real friends to enjoy; dwelling in his ancestral home and upon his lands, bought back from that despairing traitor, Jock O' the Scales.

Again, however, the tale most probably relates not to the Lyne or Lynn family of Ayrshire but to the earlier Lyne family of Peeblesshire.

=== Views of Laigh Craig Mill ===
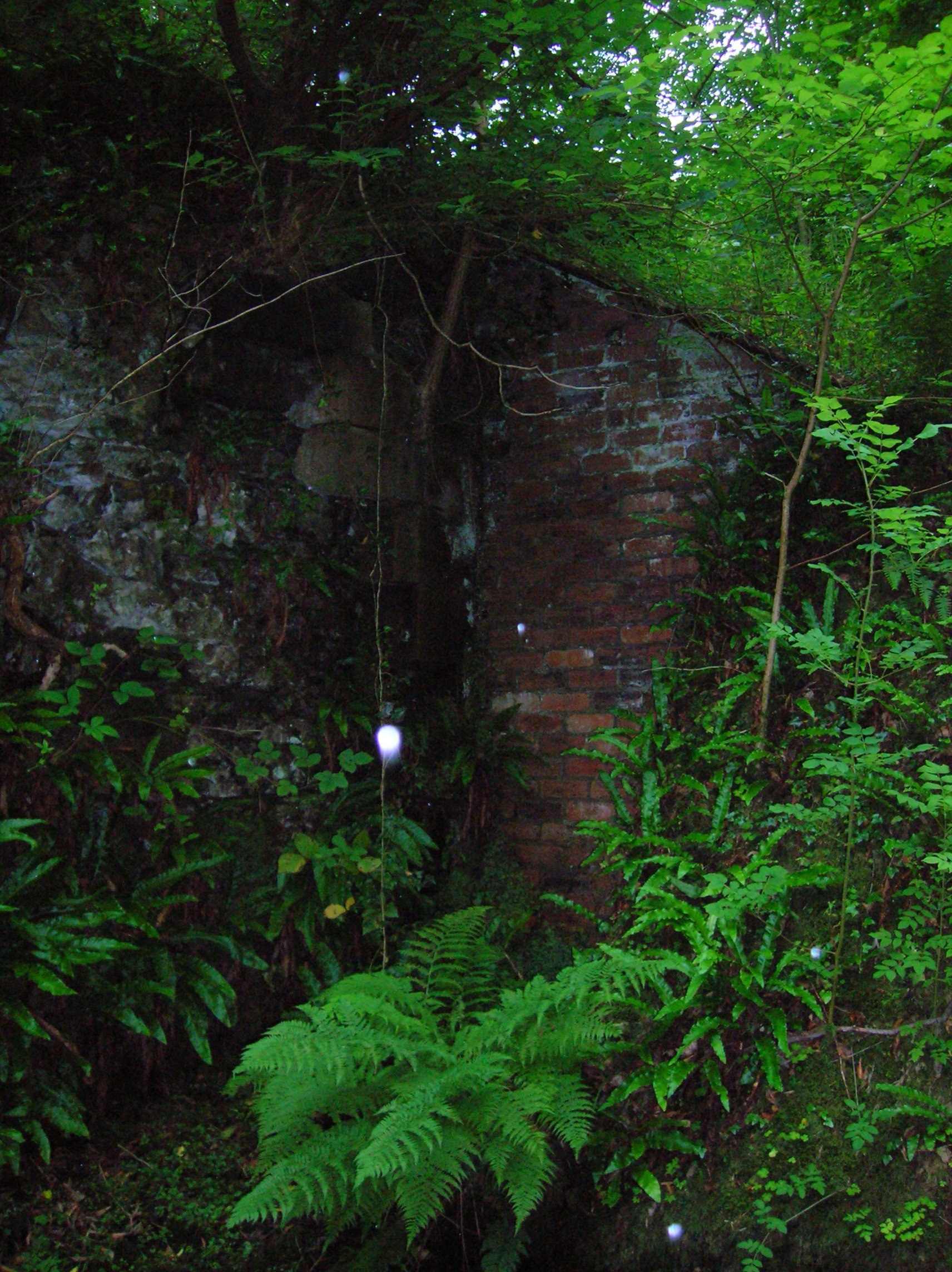
Remains of the mill lade, Craig Mill splash wall and a later roofed water pump installation.

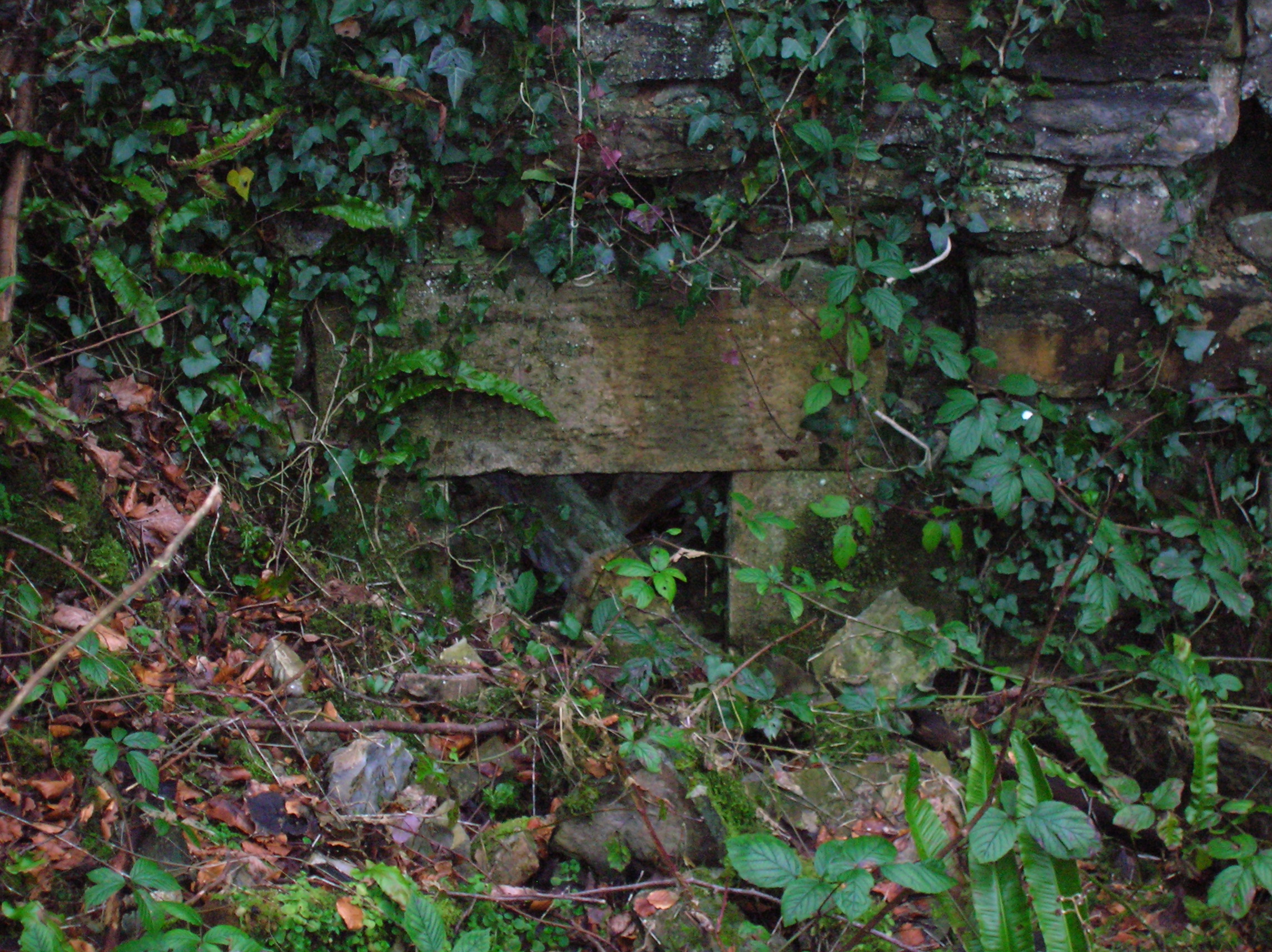
Detail of an opening in the gable end of the old mill

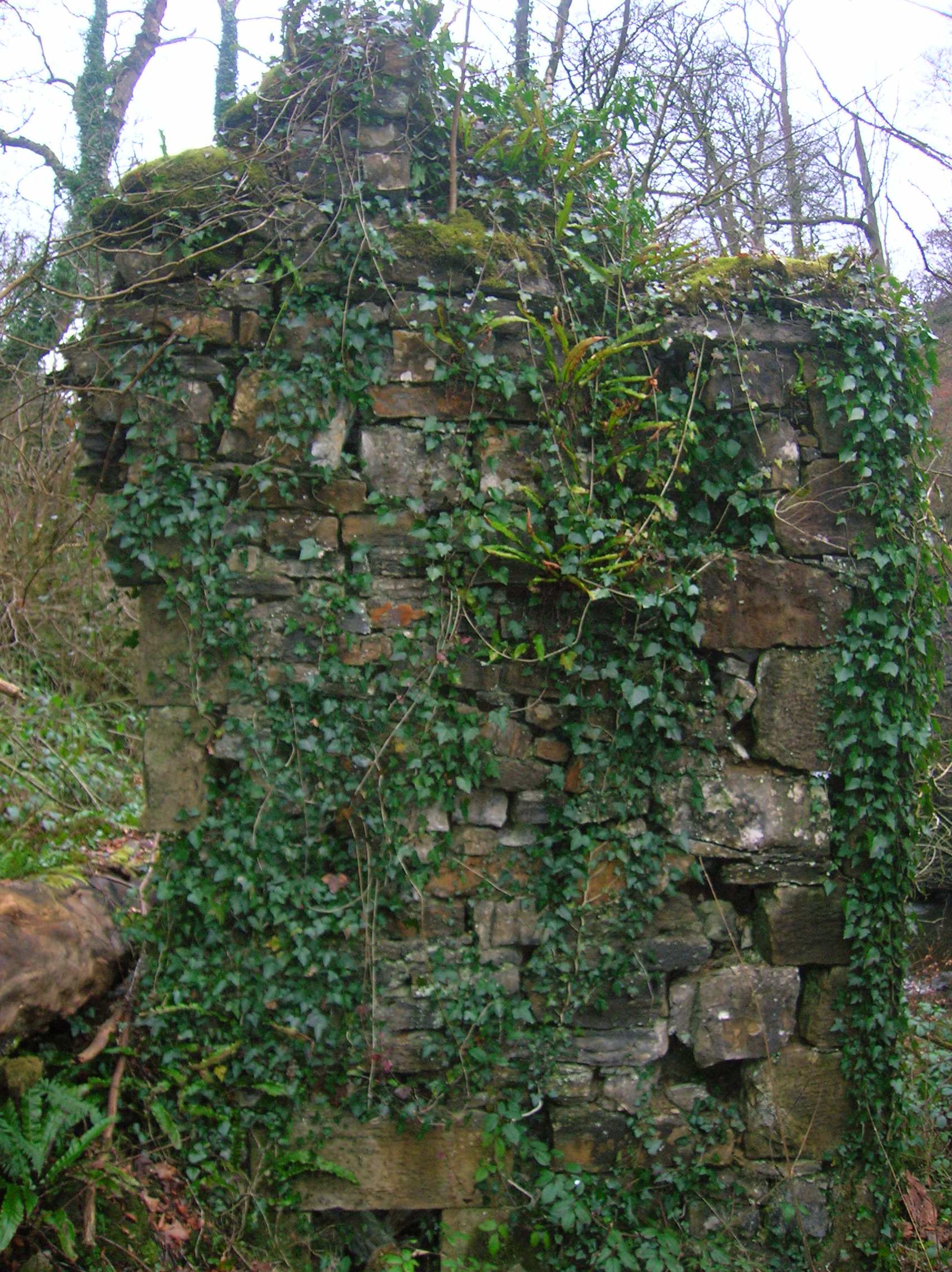
The old mill's gable end facing Linn Spout

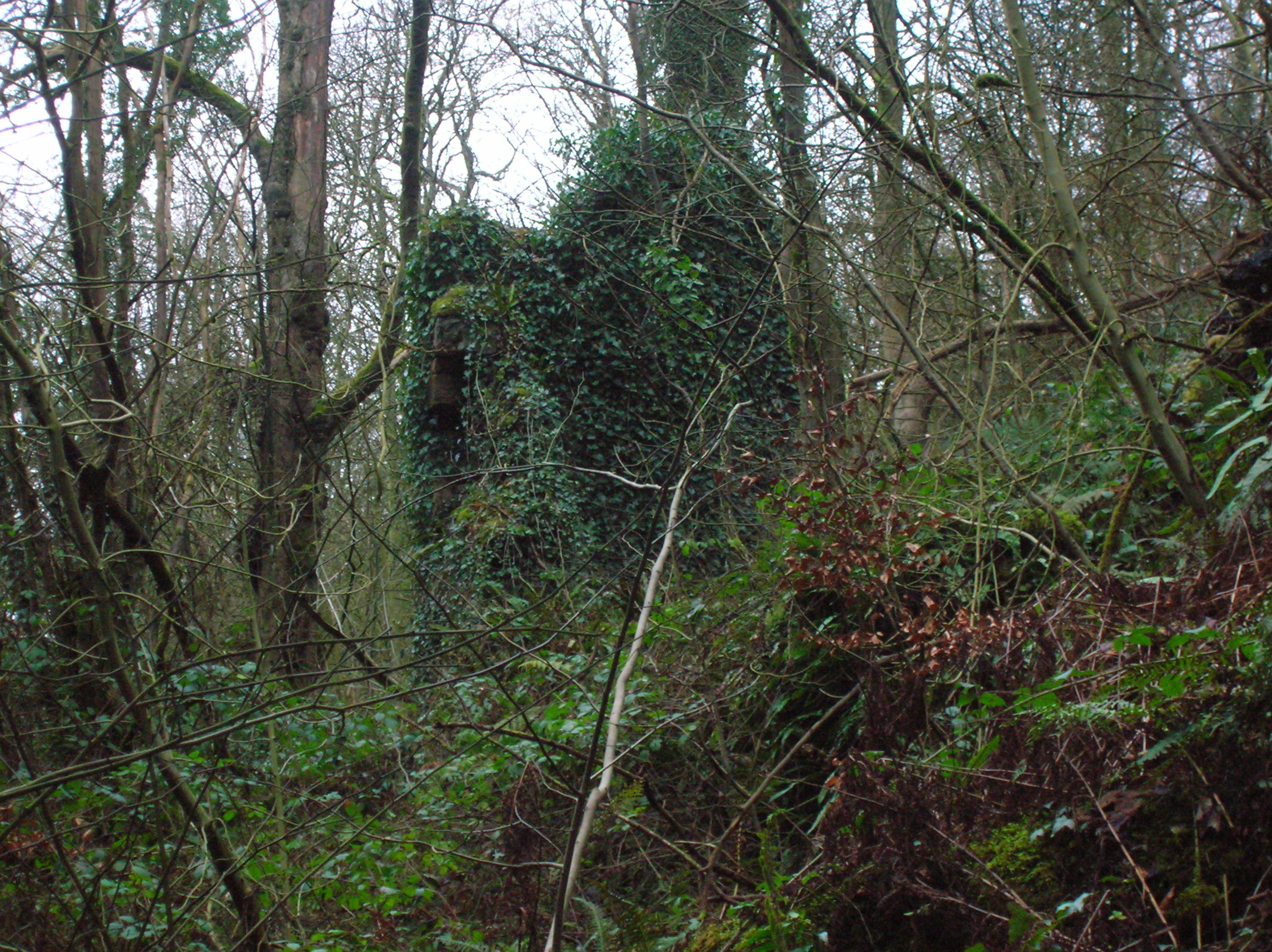
The Laigh Craig Mill ruins from below Lynn Spout. This mill was associated with Kilwinning Abbey, together with Garnock and Sevenacres mills.

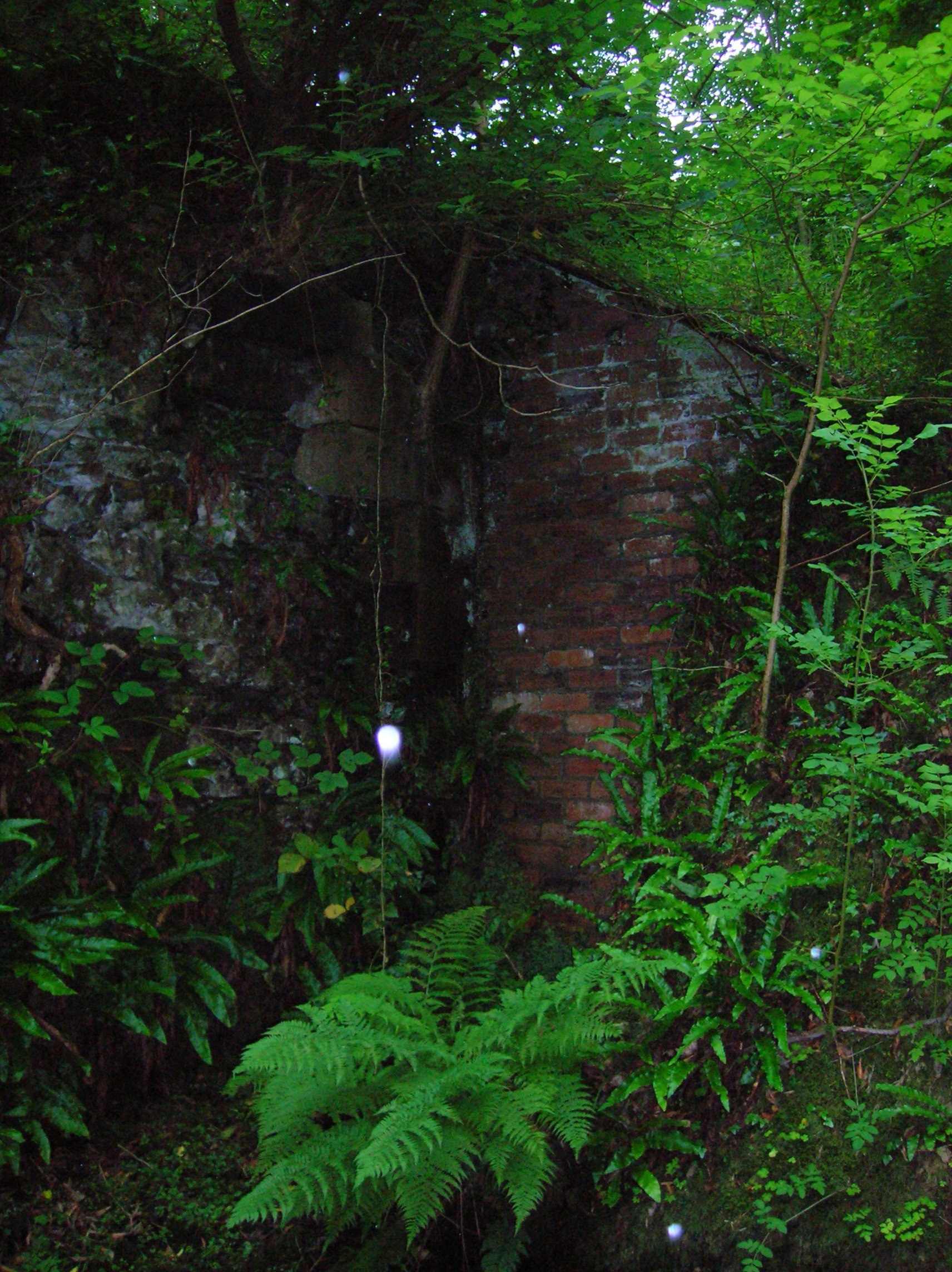
Remains of the mill lade and what was a later roofed water pump house at the site of the Craig Mill (Upper).

== See also ==
- Bessie Dunlop of Lynn

== Sources and bibliography ==
- The Genealogy of the Family of Lind, and the Montgomeries of Smithton, Sir Robert Douglas, Baronet, Windsor (1795)
- Historical Tales and Legends of Ayrshire, William Robertson, London and Glasgow (1889)
- Scottish Record Society Publications, Scottish Record Society, Edinburgh (late 19th-early 20th centuries)
- McTaggart, H & Hamilton, A (1999) Old Dalry
